= Belize Defence Force Air Wing =

Air warfare branch of the Belize Defence Force

- Air Wing Belize Defence Force Crest
- Founded: 1983; 43 years ago
- Country: Belize
- Type: Air force
- Role: Aerial warfare
- Size: 60 personnel, 6 aircraft
- Part of: Belize Defence Force
- Headquarters: Philip S. W. Goldson International Airport, Ladyville
- Motto: Latin: Arborem Supervigemus

Insignia
- Aircraft marking

- Flag

Aircraft flown
- Attack: BN-2B Defender
- Helicopter: Bell UH-1, Bell 407
- Patrol: Cessna 208,
- Trainer: Cessna 182J Skylane
- Transport: BN-2 Islander, Piper Seneca PA34

The Belize Defence Force Air Wing is the aviation branch of the Belize Defence Force. Formed in 1983, it is based at the Philip S. W. Goldson International Airport in Ladyville. The main tasks of the Air Wing are Reconnaissance, SAR, CASEVAC, COIN, aerial resupply and troop transport. Furthermore, they assist the police in drug interdiction and anti-smuggling operations, and can be called upon by the Maritime Wing.

== History ==
=== Independence transition period (1970s–1990s) ===
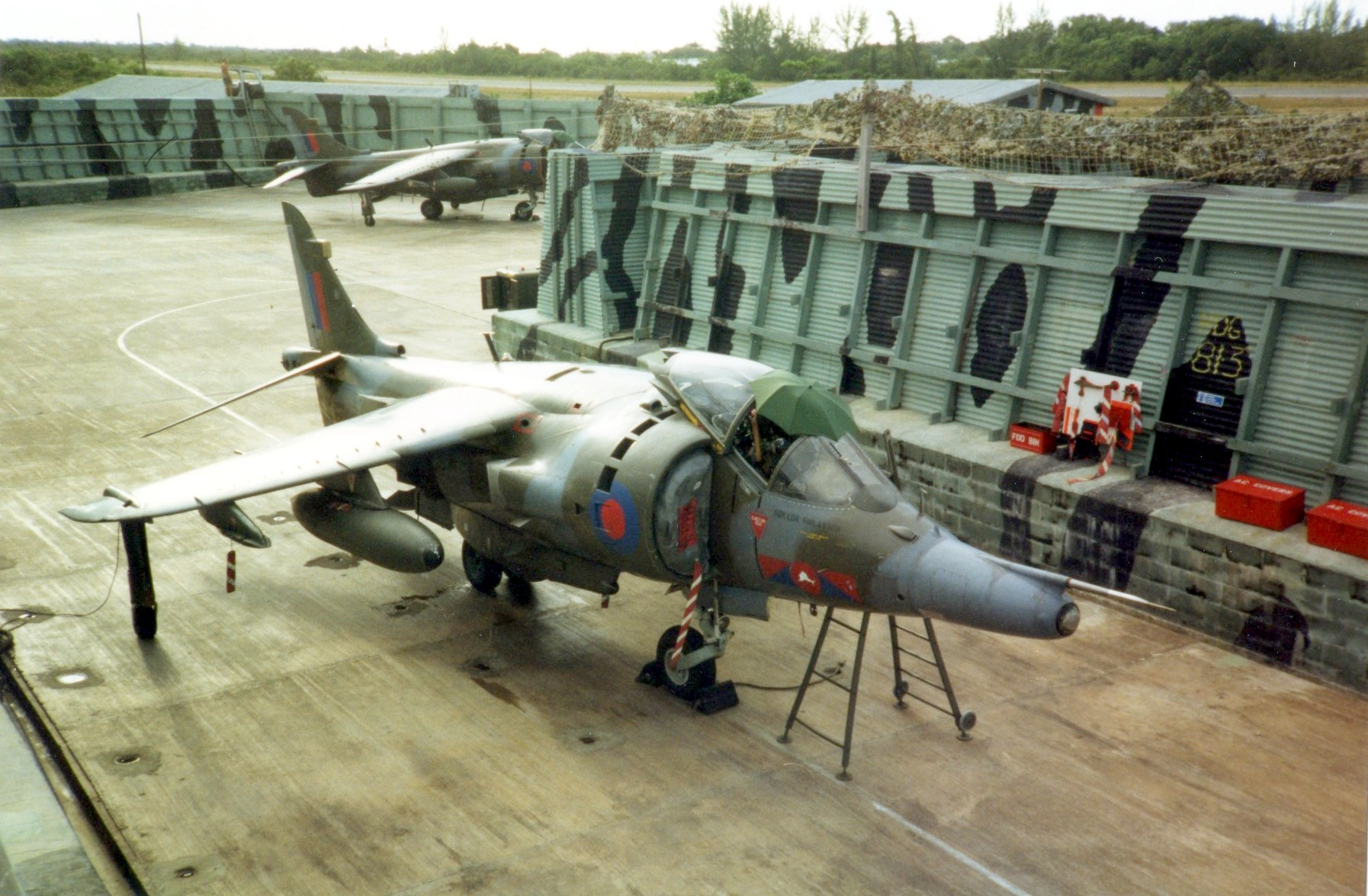
RAF Harrier GR3, RAF Belize, 1990

The 1970s mission of British aviation deployed in Belize was protected by the state of Belize, to defend it as a territory, lather to defend with it as a state. RAF Belize was the Headquarters unit of all Royal Air Force units of British Forces Belize from the mid 1970s to mid 1990s. Aircraft flown by RAF Belize the Westland Puma HC.1 and Hawker Siddeley Harrier GR.3. Logistical support from the UK was provided by Vickers VC10 and Lockheed C-130K Hercules, Short Belfast C.1 tactical and strategic transport aircraft. British air force - RAF Belize was abolished in 1993. Various aviation units have been deployed again since 2012(until now), as tensions between Belize and Guatemala escalated. When Guatemala intentionally violates the territorial waters of Belize and provokes a military conflict over several islands, especially the Sarstoon Island - Belizean–Guatemalan territorial dispute.

=== From 1983 to 2010 ===
Two Britten-Norman Defenders (registration BDF-01 and BDF-02) were purchased in Britain and formed the backbone of the air wing for years. The two aircraft could be equipped with light armament, making them the first armed aircraft in Belizean history. The British Forces in Belize maintained a strong position throughout the eighties and it was only in 1990, twelve years after its formation, that three Belizeans took command of the Belize Defence Force as Commandant of BDF, Guard Commander, Commander of Air & Maritime Wing.

The Air Wing had 2 or 3 Ayres Thrush planes that were used for counter insurgency and crop dusting which initially entered service in 1988. One of them may have crashed at some point. They have apparently been placed in storage due to being deemed obsolete. The Air Wing had a Dornier 27 from 1987 to 1990, and also a Beech A90 King Air from 2004 to 2006.

=== From 2010 to present ===
The Belize Defence Force Air Wing is responsible for recovering and storing captured aircraft such as drug planes and helicopters. One such incident occurred in 2015 when a helicopter was reported circling near the border with Mexico in Orange Walk. It was discovered abandoned at around 3:00 pm. The helicopter was a Bell 407 with the registration N607AZ. While it was suspected to be used for drug transportation, no evidence of drugs was found inside. The registration number was unmatched upon searching for it, so it was theorized that it was a fake registration to mislead authorities. If nobody came to claim it, the aircraft would be put into service with the Air Wing. As stated by Brig. Gen. David Jones of the Defence Force, it was unlikely to be claimed. However, no information is available to confirm this.

Through late 2015 and early 2016, two UH-1H helicopters were donated and delivered to the Air Wing from Taiwan, which use registration BDF-11 and BDF-12.

Wednesday, October 28, 2015. BMG: The mysterious Piper Seneca I PA34-200T with registration number N32812 today lies at the Belize Defense Force (BDF) Air Wing Compound at Price Barracks in Ladyville after spending the night at the Belize Municipal Airstrip, heavily guarded by members of the BDF and the Gang Suppression Unit (GSU). According to the FAA Aircraft Registry, the plane is owned by James Stallings of Irvine, California. However up to the time of publishing this article, no one has come forward to claim the aircraft. On June 12, 2021 during a conversation with the news channel new5 live, the commander of the BDF Air Wing mentioned, now have 7 pilots and a team of support and technicians in the air force. The New5 live news channel showed the Piper Seneca PA34-200T standing in the hangar, with BDF07 marking and color.

== Structure ==
=== Air base and military airstrip ===
- Price Barracks - Ladyville - Air Wing HQ and former British helicopter base; it is named for the country's first Prime Minister George Cadle Price
- Orange Walk Airport (Army) - Orange Walk District
- Philip S. W. Goldson International Airport - main airbase
- Hector Silva Airstrip - small base located south of the airstrip; this is a secondary airstrip and was used by the British Army
- Punta Gorda Airport is a secondary airstrip

=== Air Defence ===
Currently, air defense capabilities are still in the process of development, therefore, air defense functions are performed by territorial volunteer units, the army and the police mobile units. Light infantry weapons are used. The Air Defence primary missions include:

- Defend state facilities of vital importance against military aviation attacks from the air in low altitude;

=== Airspace Surveillance and Control ===
The protection of Belize airspace has always been a priority for the Belize Armed Forces. A civil radar system is used to monitor and control the airspace, as well as monitoring and control systems located at the main airports in Belize.

=== Mobility support unit ===
A mobile support unit, it is part of the Air Wing. It consists of a team of technicians and specialists whose duty is:

- To perform periodical works of maintenance as well as minor and medium repair of BDF Air Wing armament and equipment outdoors;
- To modernize BDF Air Wing equipment according to contemporary aviation needs;
- To prepare technical requirements for organizing competitions of centralized repair, modernization and purchasing of equipment;
- To perform periodical works of maintenance, supervision and repair of life-saving equipment used in search and rescue works;
- Raise the level of military and professional staff preparation in order to be able in future perform periodic maintenance and repair of western type aircraft.
- Maintain a constant level of aviation mobility

== Modernization ==
The United States donated a Cessna 208 Caravan aircraft to the Ministry of National Defence and Border Security on March 2, 2023. Donation value $7.84 million. The aircraft was donated by U.S. Southern Command (SOUTHCOM) through the United States Foreign Military Financing program. Cessna Caravan 208 aircraft equipped with FLIR system for patrol / SAR and recon missions. Donation will modernize the interdiction capabilities of the Belize Defence Force Airwing, making Belize better equipped to assist with reconnaissance, search and rescue, and military operations throughout the country. The donation package also includes training, spare parts, and on-site maintenance support.

== Aircraft ==
Aircraft	Origin	Type	Variant	In service	Notes
Light attack / COIN aircraft
BN-2B Defender	United Kingdom	Patrol / Multi-role	BN-2B	1	Defender was based on the civilian Islander, and has a four underwing hardpoints for pylons to attach 2,500 pounds (1,100 kg) of fuel tanks, bombs, missiles, 7.62-mm (0.3-inch) machine-gun pods, rocket pods, flares, sensors and other stores
Reconnaissance / Maritime Patrol
Cessna 208	United States	Patrol / Utility	208B EX	1	2023 donated by the US. Aircraft with FLIR system for patrol mission. BDF-08.
Transport
BN-2 Islander	United Kingdom	Utility		1	
Piper Seneca PA34	United States	Utility	PA34-200T	1	October 28, 2015 aircraft Piper Seneca PA34-200T N32812 was confiscated and handed over to the BDF; tail Nr BDF07
Helicopters
Bell UH-1	United States	Utility	UH-1H	1	BDF-11
Bell 407	United States	Utility		1	Helicopter was confiscated and handed over to the BDF
Trainer
Cessna 182 Skylane	United States	Light utility aircraft	182J	1	This aircraft BDF-03 is used by the BDF for pilot training and upgrading their qualifications

=== Retired aircraft ===
Previous aircraft operated by the Air Force consisted of the Ayres Thrush, Dornier 27, Beech A90 King Air, Slingsby T67M260 (registration BDF-03).

== Accidents ==
- On 19 October 1998, Defender BDF-01 crashed near Orange Walk. A US Chinook helicopter retrieved it in 1999. BDF-01 was unable to be repaired, so a replacement Defender was received in 2003, with registration BDF-05.
- On 3 April 2007, BDF-05 crashed in a marshy area near the Belizean coast. No fatalities were sustained, and a US UH-60 Black Hawk airlifted it out of the area. After this, the Defense Forces' Cessna 208 bore the registration BDF-05 (before 2020 so not the Cessna 208 BDF-08 donated by USA in 2023).
- One of two UH-1 helicopters (BDF-12) donated by Taiwan in 2016 crashed on February 28, 2020.

== Ranks and insignia ==
Officers

The rank insignia for commissioned officers for the air force.

Rank group	General / flag officers	Senior officers	Junior officers
Belize Defence Force Air Wing
Belize Defence Force Air Wing		Major	Captain	Lieutenant	Second lieutenant

Other ranks

Rank group	Senior NCOs				Junior NCOs		Enlisted
Belize Defence Force Air Wing							No insignia
Belize Defence Force Air Wing	Warrant officer class 1	Warrant officer class 2	Staff sergeant	Sergeant	Corporal	Lance corporal	Private (or equivalent)

== Sources ==
- Hackett, James, ed. (14 February 2022). "The 2022 Military Balance Chart". The Military Balance. 122 (1). International Institute for Strategic Studies. ISSN 0459-7222.
