= Belize Defence Force =

Military of Belize

- Flag of the Belize Defence Force
- Motto: "Shoulder To Shoulder"
- Founded: 1 January 1978; 48 years ago
- Service branches: Ground forces; Volunteer forces; Special Operation Task Force (SOTF); Air Wing; Special Boat Unit
- Headquarters: Price Barracks, Ladyville
- Website: www.bdf.mil.bz

Leadership
- Commander-in-Chief: Charles III, King of Belize, represented by Froyla Tzalam, Governor-General of Belize
- Minister of National Defence and Border Security: Hon. Oscar Mira
- Commander of the Defence Force: Brigadier General Azariel Loria

Personnel
- Conscription: Laws allow for conscription only if volunteers are insufficient.
- Active personnel: 2,000 (2020 approx)
- Reserve personnel: 850 (2016 approx)

Expenditure
- Budget: 1.6% (2023) US$47.3 million (2023)

Industry
- Foreign suppliers: United Kingdom; Japan; United States; Taiwan; Canada; Germany

Related articles
- History: Haitian conflict
- Ranks: Military ranks of Belize

The Belize Defence Force (BDF) is the military of Belize, and is responsible for protecting the sovereignty of the country. The BDF is under the Ministry of National Defence and Border Security, which is currently headed by Hon. Oscar Mira; the BDF itself is commanded by Brigadier General Azariel Loria. In 2012, the Belizean government spent about $17 million on the military, constituting 1.08% of the country's gross domestic product (GDP).

== History ==
The military of Belize dates back to 1817, when the Prince Regent Royal Honduras Militia, a volunteer organization, was founded.

Between 1817 and 1978, the military force in Belize had ten different names:

- The Prince Regent's Royal Militia (1817–1866)
- The Belize Volunteer Force (1866–1868)
- The Belize Volunteer Corps (1868–1883)
- The Belize Light Infantry Volunteer Force (1897–1905)
- British Honduras Volunteers (1905–1916)
- British Honduras Territorial Force (1916–1928)
- British Honduras Defence Force (1928–1942)
- British Honduras Home Guard (1942–1943)
- British Honduras Volunteer Guard (1943–1973)
- Belize Volunteer Guard (1973–1977)

The BDF was founded in 1978 following the disbanding of the Belize Volunteer Guard and the Police Special Force the year before.

After Belize achieved independence in 1981, the United Kingdom maintained the deterrent British Forces Belize in the country to protect it from invasion by Guatemala. During the 1980s this included a battalion and No. 1417 Flight RAF of Harriers. The main British force left in 1994, three years after Guatemala recognised Belizean independence, but the United Kingdom maintained a training presence via the British Army Training and Support Unit Belize (BATSUB) and 25 Flight AAC until 2011 when the last British Forces left Ladyville Barracks, with the exception of seconded advisers. The BDF Maritime Wing became part of the Belize Coast Guard Service in November 2005.

On 15 October 2011, the BDF changed their issued military uniforms from American-based to digital versions since October due to concerns that criminals can easily acquire them.

In October 2015, due to rising tensions between Belize and Guatemala and the British cutback on military bases worldwide to focus on the war on terror in 2011, Belize asked the UK to bring BATSUB back; the British Government brought BATSUB to Belize once again.

In 2024 BDF personnel were deployed to Haiti as part of the Kenyan-led Multinational Security Support Mission, which has since been replaced by the United Nations mandated Gang Suppression Force.

== Organization ==
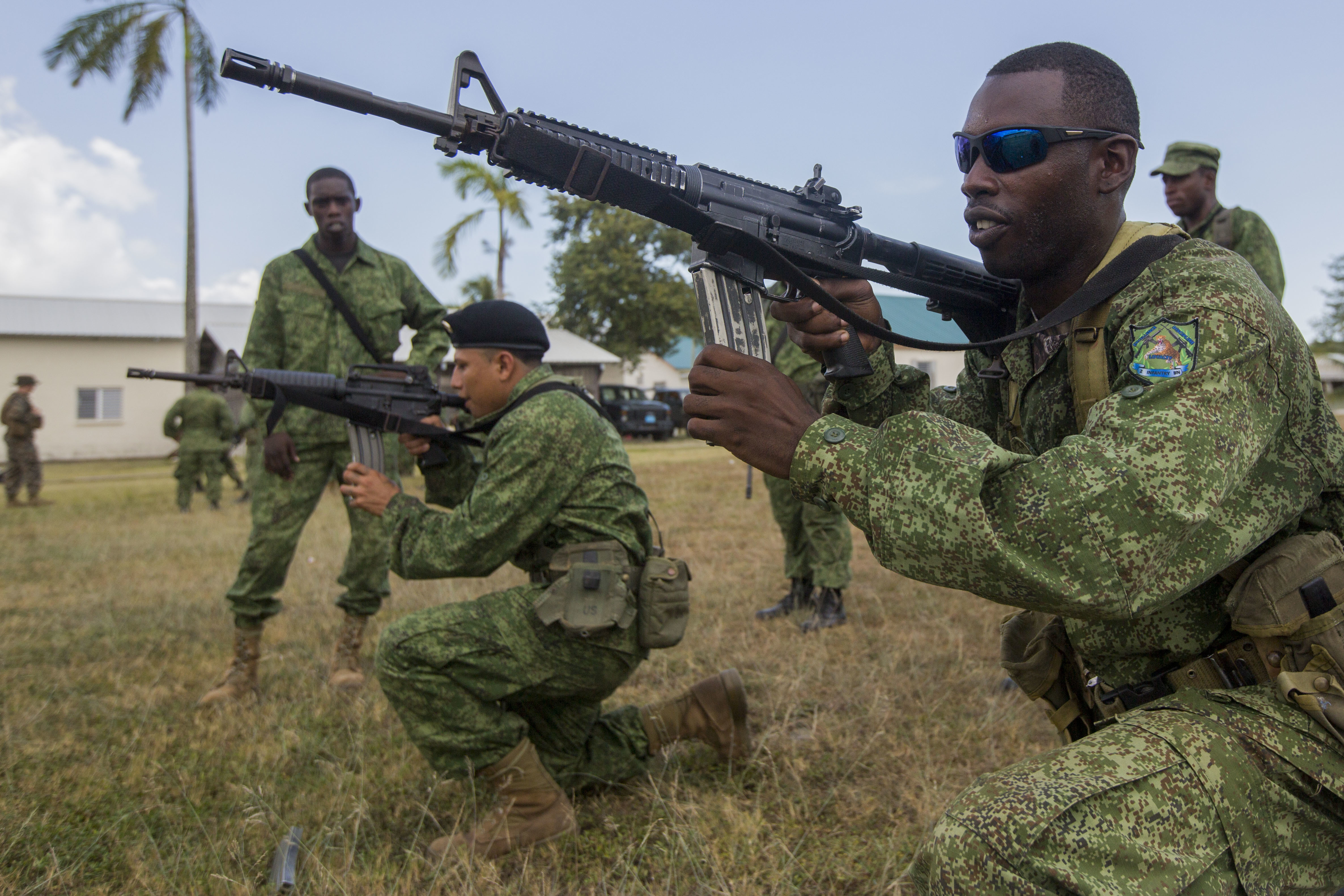
EMR camouflage wearing BDF soldiers training from 2nd. Battalion

The BDF consists of:

- Headquarters
- Service/Support Battalion
- Two Regular Battalions
- One Volunteer Battalion
- Air Wing
- Special Boat Unit
- Support Group
- Cadets
- BDF Band

=== 1st Infantry Battalion ===
The First Infantry Battalion came into existence in 1993. This was as a direct result of the British Government decision to withdraw British Forces from Belize and handing over the Defence of Belize to Belizeans. Since that time, the battalion participated in extensive military exercises in Belize as well a selected part of its staff going abroad to participate in United Nations Peace Operations in Haiti. The battalion consists of three infantry companies and a small HQ staff. It operates in the entire country alternating from the south to the north of the country. Presently, it is stationed at Fairweather Camp, Punta Gorda in the Toledo District with its two companies and in Belize City maintaining a presence to accomplish its task as stipulated in the Defence Act. Every February, the battalions alternate between Ladyville and Punta Gorda. The Battalion is equipped with small arms, a fleet of transportation, its integral logistics slice, and its own signalers. Other support is received from the Logistics unit in Price Barracks. Recruiting for the unit is done by the BDF Headquarters and its leaders are trained by the Logistics Company's sub-unit, Training Company. The leaders then train their subordinates to maintain its training standards. The companies also conduct live firing in the Mountain Pine Ridge Training Area periodically.

=== 2nd Infantry Battalion ===
Second Infantry Battalion, a combination of male and female soldiers, was formed on 1 October 1994. The Battalion at that time had three Infantry Companies: Sierra, Alpha and Echo Company. For the period 31 October 2000 to 31 August 2002, the Battalion nomenclature was revoked and redesignated a Land Command. Becoming either Land Command South (LCS) or Land Command North (LCN) depending on the rotation. LCN comprises the Cayo District, a partition of the Hummingbird Highway, Belize, Orange Walk and Corozal Districts. LCS comprises the Toledo and Stann Creek Districts and a portion of the Hummingbird Highway. These are now presently designated Battalion Tactical Areas of Responsibility (Bn TAOR) and Command HQs were based on rotation between Price Barracks and Fairweather Camp in Punta Gorda.

On 31 August 2002, LCS and LCN was reverted to being Second Infantry Battalion. This was under the command of Lieutenant Colonel Reynolds Lewis. However, this time the Coys were Hotel, Gulf and Sierra Companies. During the tenure of Lieutenant Colonel R J Lewis, the idea of a Battalion Logo and Flag was originated. The idea was presented out within the Battalion and as a result produced the logo and Bn Emblem. The finished product was the result of the combined efforts of RSM 2 Bn, WO1 D O Castillo then a WO2, Pte August G, Pte Coc J and the artist Pte Cho D, not to overlook the efforts of Sgt L Sho and Sgt A Sho (Button) then Cpl for final graphics.

The battalion's logo incorporates the colors of its constituent companies: red and green for Hotel Company, red and orange for Gulf Company and black and white for Sierra Company. The design features a grey background, representing the original Battalion color that was changed to blue on the official battalion flag. Crossed rifles are prominently displayed to signify the unit's infantry designation. Additionally, the jabiru serves as the battalion's avian mascot, chosen to symbolize versatility. The physical characteristics of the jabiru reflect the unit's operational ethos: its high nesting habits symbolize elevated situational awareness, its wide wingspan denotes speed and precision during an assault, and its long legs represent adaptability across diverse terrains and environments.

=== 1st Volunteer Battalion ===
In 1866, the detachment of the 4th West Indian Regiment was defeated in battle by the Indians near Orange Walk. Volunteers were enrolled at Belize and sent to the Hondo to deal with Indian raids locally. In January 1881, the volunteers were formed into four companies, A, B, C and D. In 1897, the Belize Light Infantry Volunteers was formed. On 25 November 1904, a mounted Infantry Company was formed. This Company justified very early its existence by providing the volunteers with a valuable mobile force during the Indian disturbances in the Western District.

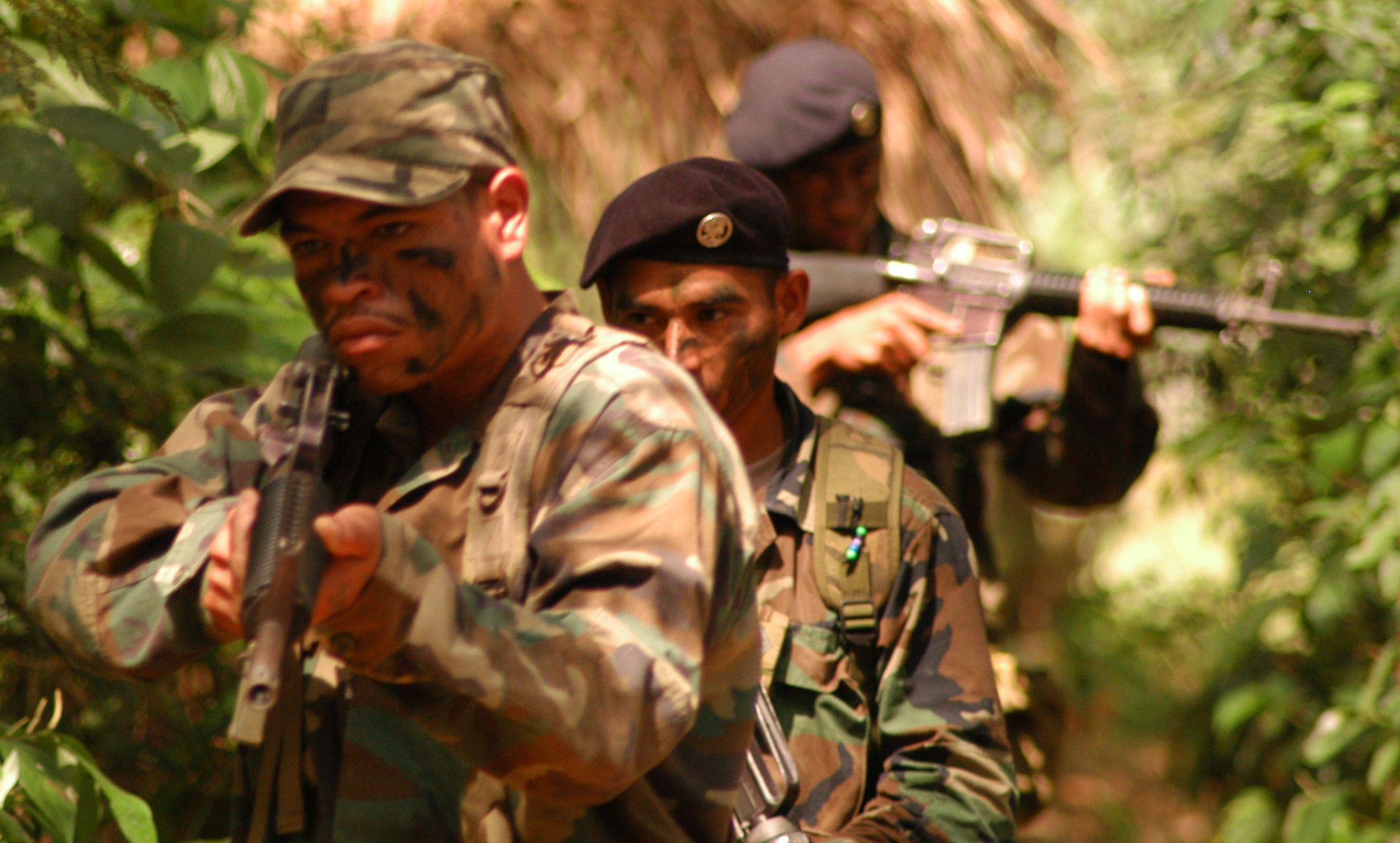
Belize army M16A2 assault rifle

On 4 August 1914, the astounding news reached Belize that Great Britain had declared war on Germany in defence of Belgium. The force was immediately called out for active service. Later when another offer of men was accepted, 100 men under Lieutenant R. H. Furness was dispatched to England. These men made so good an impression that more men were asked for and a second contingent of over 400 men was sent over.

Men eager to serve but debarred from going overseas for one reason or another joined the volunteers and swelled the strength to over 1000. Companies were formed in Corozal, Stann Creek, El Cayo and Orange Walk, and detachments at Benque Viejo and Hill Bank.

In August 1928, this force was disbanded and a new force of four platoons renamed the British Honduras Defence Force was formed. This force made its first public appearance on 4 February 1929, immediately after the great hurricane of 1931 which destroyed the City of Belize. The defence force rendered most valuable services. Some of the finest examples of discipline, loyalty and esprit de corps were demonstrated when men had lost their homes and in some cases their families quickly made their way to the drill hall before the fury of the devastating winds had abated in answer to the "Fall in" call of the bugle. The force was organized into rescue squads and all sorts of services were performed, from rescuing trapped persons, collecting the injured and the dead, to caring and feeding of babies. Men of all walks of life in Belize, members of the legislature, Heads of Government, department clerks and the ordinary laborer, seeing what organization and discipline could do, joined the defence force.

=== Support Battalion ===
The Support Battalion commands the specialist platoons of the force. They are the Administrative Company, Mortar Platoon, Signal Platoon, Reece Platoon and the Combat Engineer Platoon. The Combat Engineer Platoon, formerly referred to as the Assault Pioneers in the early days of the BDF, has heavy equipment at its disposal and is trained to renovate and erect buildings as well as engage in construction. Part of the engineer unit is an Explosive Ordnance Device Team. Its role is to defuse or destroy bombs and engage in demolition work.

=== Special Boat Unit ===
The SBU's mandate includes mainly the entire country of Belize, all the rivers and the coast lines, which operates under the Air Wing. The unit is in charge of making sure that no illegal activities occur within the country of Belize in the rivers and the coastline. They have a variety of boats which includes outboards and jet drive, however they are moving more into the riverine capabilities because their mandate includes mostly rivers.

To distinguish them from the Belize Coast Guard, because their uniform is similar, people from the special boat unit wear blue digitals whereas the coast guard use full blue. The coast guard are mainly found along the seas whereas they restrict their presence to mainly the riverine areas.

=== Special Assignment Group ===
The Belize Special Assignment Group is the BDF's special forces unit. The Special Operations Force is responsible for special reconnaissance, direct actions, and military support.

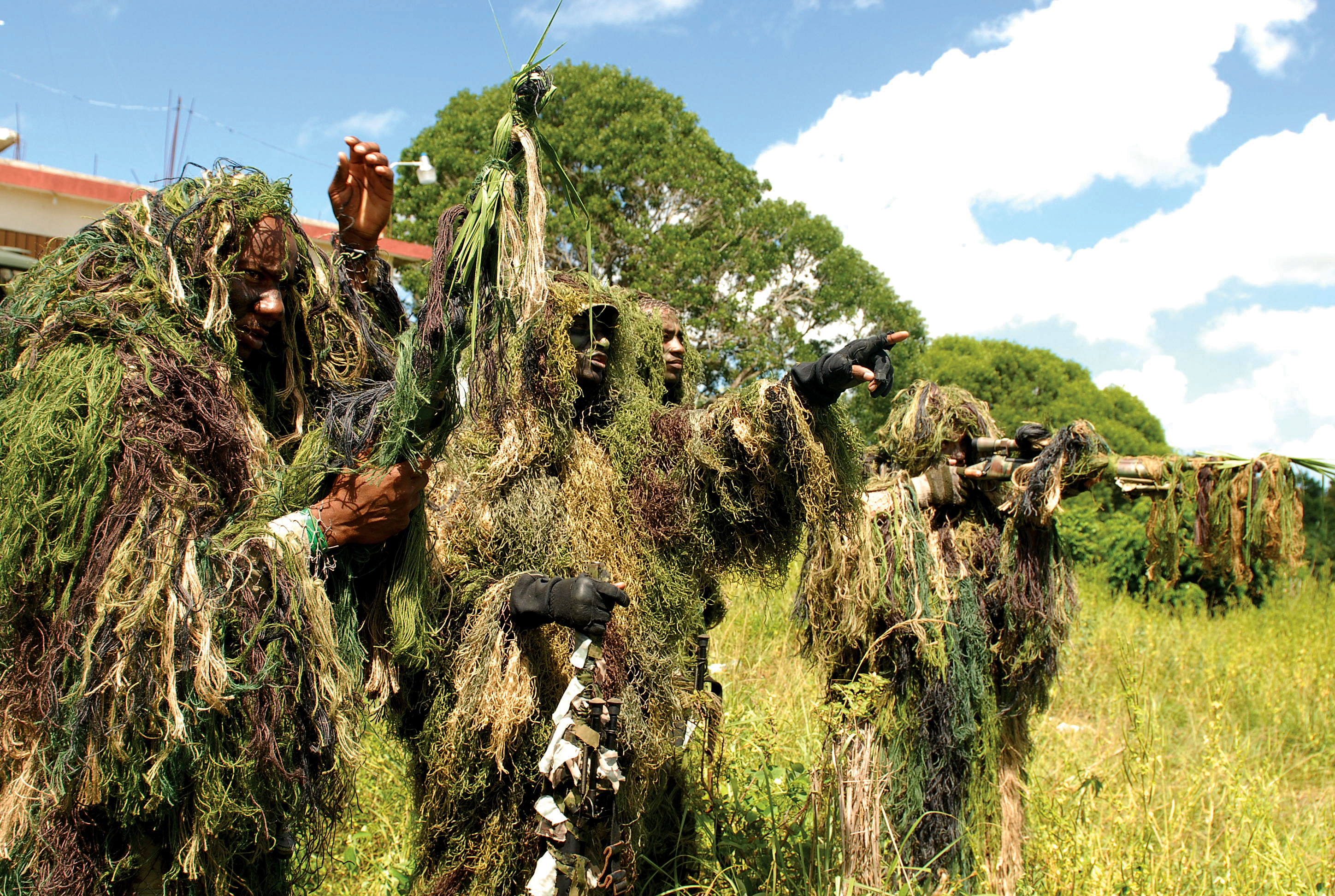
Belize army Remington 700 sniper rifle

=== Belize Defence Force Band ===
The BDF Band was formed on 1 January 1978 from the former Belize Volunteer Guard Band, under the mastership of the late Warrant Officer Class 1, Walter P. Lamb. The band was originally formed in 1947 from the North Caribbean Force (Battalion of Belize) fundamentally as a Drum & Bugle Corps, at Mount Pleasant Creek, Central Farm in the Cayo District. In 1952, it added the brass section to the Drums & Bugles Corps that was the nucleus of what would evolve into the existing BDF Band.

=== Three reserve companies ===
The BDF maintains three reserve companies.

=== British Army Training and Support Unit Belize BATSUB ===
British Army Training Support Unit Belize (BATSUB), the successor of the former British Forces Belize, is the name given to the current British Army Garrison in Belize. The garrison is used primarily for jungle warfare training. As of 2012, there are also 40 British Army personnel stationed in Belize.

== International cooperation ==
In May 2024, the Belize Defence Force and Belize Coast Guard announced it would send 50 service members to Haiti, working alongside forces from the Bahamas, Jamaica, Benin, and Kenya to help the country deal with its nation-wide gang war. In September of that year, the BDF sent two officers to Jamaica, announcing on Twitter that it "will be collaborating with the Jamaica Defence Force as part of a multinational task force dedicated to supporting Haiti's restoration efforts."

== Equipment ==
=== Infantry weapons ===
Name	Photo	Origin	Type	Variant	Notes
Handguns
Browning Hi-Power		Belgium	Semi-automatic pistol	FN35	Standard side arm
Submachine guns
Sterling submachine gun		United Kingdom	Submachine gun	L2A3	
Assault rifles
M4 carbine		United States	Assault rifle	M4A1	
M16 rifle		United States	Assault rifle	M16A2	
Machine guns
FN MAG		Belgium	General-purpose machine gun		
FN Minimi		United States	Light machine gun	M249	
Heavy machine guns
M2 Browning		United States	Heavy machine gun		Used on patrol boats
Sniper rifles
Remington 700		United States	Sniper rifle		Bolt action rifle
Hand grenades
M18		United States	Smoke grenade		
L83A1		United Kingdom	Smoke screening hand grenade		
L109A1		United Kingdom	fragmentation grenade		
Grenade launchers
M203		United States	grenade launcher	40mm	
Anti-tank weapons
Carl Gustaf recoilless rifle		Sweden	Recoilless rifle		

=== Mortars ===
Name	Photo	Origin	Type	Variant	Notes
Light infantry mortars
L16 mortar		United Kingdom	Mortar	81mm	

=== Unmanned aerial vehicles ===
Name	Origin	Type	Type	Notes
Patrol drones
Skyfront	United States	Unmanned aerial vehicles	Perimeter 8+ UAV	The Belize Coast Guard drone squadron with Perimeter 8+ unmanned aerial vehicles (UAVs), acquired with the help of the United States through California-based military robotics firm Skyfront.

=== Light utility vehicles ===
Name	Photo	Origin	Type	In Service	Notes
Utility vehicle
Jeep J8		United States	utility vehicle	6	gifted by the US
Land Rover Defender		United Kingdom	Sport utility vehicle	4+	donated by the British upon BATSUB’s departure in 2011
Pickup truck
Mahindra Scorpio Getaway		India	Pickup truck	10	
Ford F250		United States	Pickup truck	10	8 assigned to the Defence Force and two to the Belize Coast Guard.
Ford F450		United States	Pickup truck	2	assigned to the Special Boat Unit.
Toyota Hilux		Japan	Pickup truck	1	assigned to the administration.
Nissan Frontier		Japan	Pickup truck	1	For patrol mission.
Military ambulance
Toyota Land Cruiser		Japan	Military ambulance	2	
Jeep J8		United States	Military ambulance	1	
All-terrain vehicle
Polaris		United States	All-terrain vehicle	6	

=== Logistic and engineering vehicles ===
Name	Photo	Origin	Type	In Service	Notes
Trucks
Hino 500		Japan	logistical	21	donated by the US
Bedford TM		United Kingdom	logistical	17	donated by the British upon BATSUB’s departure in 2011
Engineering vehicles
John Deere		United States	tractor	1	5055E - series

=== Special boat units Fleet ===
Class	Photo	Origin	Type	Boats	In service	Notes
River patrol
Metal shark		United States	Fast patrol boat	24Riverine	6	patrolling of the Sarstoon River and transport of troops up to Cadenas and the mouth of the Sarstoon
Nor-tex		United States	Interceptor/Fast patrol boat	2008	2+	2 NOR-TECH Interceptor Fast Patrol Boats donated by the U.S. in 2009
BDF 'SARSTOON'		Belize	Fast transport cutter		3+	patrolling of the Sarstoon River and transport of troops up to Cadenas and the mouth of the Sarstoon
BDF03 'MOHO' BDF04 'HONDO'		Belize	fast cutter		2+	patrolling of the Sarstoon River and transport of troops up to Cadenas and the mouth of the Sarstoon

== Facilities ==
- Mountain Pine Ridge Training Area - south of Belmopan used for jungle warfare by Belize, US, German, Dutch and British forces
- Price Barracks - Ladyville - Air Wing HQ and former British helicopter base; it is named for the country's first Prime Minister George Cadle Price
- Fairweather Camp - Punta Gorda Town - HQ for 2nd Bat and former British military base
- Orange Walk Airport (Army) - Orange Walk District
- Belizario Camp - San Ignacio - border area base
- Corozal Training Centre - Corozal Town
- Dangriga Training Centre - Dangriga
- Philip S. W. Goldson International Airport - main airbase
- Hector Silva Airstrip - small base located south of the airstrip; this is a secondary airstrip and was used by the British Army
- Punta Gorda Airport is a secondary airstrip
- St. George's Caye (Army)
- Holdfast Camp (Army)
- Baldy Beacons (Army)
- Rideau Camp (Army)
- Salamanca Camp (Army)
- Militia Hall- Belize City

== Ranks and insignia ==
=== Officers ===
The rank insignia for commissioned officers for BDF.

Rank group	General / flag officers		Senior officers			Junior officers
Belize Defence Force
Belize Defence Force	Major-general	Brigadier general	Colonel	Lieutenant colonel	Major	Captain	Lieutenant	Second lieutenant
Rank group	General / flag officers		Senior officers			Junior officers
