= List of airports in Belize =

This is a list of airports in Belize, sorted by location.

== Public airports ==
Names shown in bold indicate the airport has scheduled passenger service on commercial airlines.

Location served	District	ICAO	IATA	Airport name	Coordinates
Belize City	BZ	MZBZ	BZE	**Philip S. W. Goldson International Airport**	17°32′58″N 088°17′31″W
Belize City	BZ	MZBE	TZA	**Sir Barry Bowen Municipal Airport**	17°31′00″N 088°11′41″W
Belmopan	CY	MZBP	BCV	**Hector Silva Airstrip**	17°16′10″N 088°46′34″W
Caye Caulker	BZ	MZCK	CUK	**Caye Caulker Municipal Airport**	17°44′06″N 088°01′58″W
Corozal	CZ	MZCZ	CZH	**Corozal Airport** (formerly Ranchito Airstrip)	18°22′54″N 088°24′42″W
Dangriga	SC	MZPB	DGA	**Dangriga Airport** (formerly Pelican Beach Airstrip)	16°58′57″N 88°13′50″W
Independence	SC	MZSV	INB	**Savannah Airstrip**	16°32′04″N 088°26′29″W
Orange Walk	OW	MZTH	ORZ	**H. E. Alfredo Martinez Airstrip**	18°02′49″N 088°35′03″W
Placencia	SC	MZPL	PLJ	**Placencia Municipal Airport**	16°32′13″N 088°21′42″W
Punta Gorda	TO	MZPG	PND	**Punta Gorda Airport**	16°06′08″N 088°48′29″W
San Ignacio	CY	MZCF	SQS	Matthew Spain Airstrip	17°11′09″N 089°00′35″W
San Ignacio	CY	MZMF	CYD	Maya Flats Airport	17°06′18″N 089°06′04″W
San Pedro	BZ	MZSP	SPR	**John Greif II Airport**	17°54′50″N 087°58′16″W
Sarteneja	CZ	MZSJ	SJX	**Sarteneja Airstrip**	18°21′21″N 088°07′51″W

== Private and Agricultural Aerodromes ==
Location Served	District	ICAO	IATA	Aerodrome Name	Coordinates
Belize Air Ranch	CY		LAF	Belize Air Ranch	17°11'49.0"N 88°53'46.0"W
Belize Aquaculture Ltd.	SC			Belize Aquaculture Ltd.	16°39'08.3"N 88°22'15.6"W
Turneffe Atoll	BZ	MZBB		Blackbird Caye Airstrip	17°19'07.6"N 87°47'51.8"W
Big Creek	SC	MZBG	BGK	Big Creek Airstrip	16°31′13″N 088°24′36″W
Blue Creek	OW			Rempel Hangar	17°54'07.2"N 88°59'12.9"W
Blue Creek	OW			San Felipe Airstrip	17°53'07.4"N 88°53'14.5"W
Caye Chapel	BZ	MZCP	CYC	Caye Chapel Airport	17°41′02″N 088°02′42″W
Cisco Hill	CY			Cisco Farm Airstrip	17°04'09.9"N 88°35'35.3"W
Mountain Pine Ridge	CY			Hidden Valley Airstrip	17°03'45.2"N 88°51'41.4"W
Mountain Pine Ridge	CY			Blancaneaux Lodge Airstrip	17°02'20"N 88°57'17"W
Gallon Jug	OW	MZGJ		Chan Chich Airstrip	17°34′00″N 089°03′00″W
Kanantik	SC			Kanantik Airstrip	16°43'42.2"N 88°22'08.5"W
Lamanai	OW			Lamanai	17°44'55.1"N 88°39'23.3"W
Northern Caye	BZ	MZLH		Northern Two Cayes Airstrip	17°27′13″N 087°29′53″W
Indian Creek	TO			Rio Dorado Airstrip	16°18'41.0"N 88°49'36.4"W
Royal Mayan Shrimp Farm	SC			Royal Mayan Shrimp Farm	16°35'57.1"N 88°25'23.2"W
Spanish Lookout	CY	MZSL	MZE	Spanish Lookout Airport (Manatee Airport)	17°16′42″N 089°01′26″W
Silver Creek	SC	MZKT	SVK	Silver Creek Airport	16°43′42″N 088°22′09″W
White Ridge Farm				White Ridge Farm	
Old Belize Heliport				Old Belize Heliport	
Cisco Heliport				Cisco Heliport	

== Abandoned Aerodromes ==
Aerodrome Name	Location Served	District	ICAO	IATA	Coordinates
Augustine Airstrip	Da Silva Ranger Station	CY			16°58'13"N 88°59'15"W
Consejo Shores Airstrip	Consejo	CZ			18°27'28"N 88°18'38"W
Gold Button Airstrip	San Felipe	OW			
Johnny Chan Chen Airstrip	Chan Chen	CZ	MZJC		18°26′26″N 088°27′12″W
Melinda Airport	Hope Creek (emergency use only)	SC	MZML	MDB	17°00′09″N 88°18′05″W

== Uncompleted ==
Location Served	District	ICAO	IATA	Aerodrome Name	Coordinates
Placencia	SC			Riversdale International Airport	16°41'06"N 88°20'55"W

== Under Construction ==
Location Served	District	ICAO	IATA	Aerodrome Name	Coordinates
Ambergris Caye	BZ			San Pedro International Airport	17°57'06"N 87°58'06"W

== See also ==
- Transport in Belize
- List of airports by ICAO code: M#MZ - Belize
- Wikipedia: WikiProject Aviation/Airline destination lists: North America#Belize
