= Military ranks of Belize =

The Military ranks of Belize are the military insignia used by the Belize Defence Force and Belize Coast Guard. Belize shares a rank structure similar to those used in the United Kingdom and the United States of America.

== Commissioned officer ranks ==
The rank insignia of commissioned officers.

Rank group	General / flag officers		Senior officers			Junior officers
Belize Defence Force
Belize Defence Force	Major-general	Brigadier general	Colonel	Lieutenant colonel	Major	Captain	Lieutenant	Second lieutenant
Belize Coast Guard
Belize Coast Guard	Rear admiral	Rear admiral (lower half)	Captain	Commander	Lieutenant commander	Lieutenant	Lieutenant (junior grade)	Ensign
Belize Defence Force Air Wing
Belize Defence Force Air Wing					Major	Captain	Lieutenant	Second lieutenant
Rank group	General / flag officers		Senior officers			Junior officers

=== Student officer ranks ===
Rank group	Student officer
Officer cadet

== Other ranks ==
The rank insignia of non-commissioned officers and enlisted personnel.

Rank group	Senior NCOs					Junior NCOs		Enlisted
Belize Defence Force								No insignia
Belize Defence Force	Warrant officer class 1	Warrant officer class 2	Staff sergeant	Sergeant		Corporal	Lance corporal	Private (or equivalent)
Belize Coast Guard
Belize Coast Guard	Master chief petty officer	Senior chief petty officer	Chief petty officer	Petty officer first class	Petty officer second class	Petty officer third class	Seaman	Seaman apprentice
Belize Defence Force Air Wing								No insignia
Belize Defence Force Air Wing	Warrant officer class 1	Warrant officer class 2	Staff sergeant	Sergeant		Corporal	Lance corporal	Private (or equivalent)
Rank group	Senior NCOs					Junior NCOs		Enlisted
