= RAF Belize =

- Disbanded: 1993
- Country: United Kingdom
- Allegiance: Royal Air Force (RAF)
- Part of: British Forces Belize
- Garrison/HQ: Airport Camp, Ladyville, Belize

Aircraft flown
- Fighter: Hawker Siddeley Harrier GR.3
- Helicopter: Westland Puma HC.1

RAF Belize was the Headquarters unit of all Royal Air Force units of British Forces Belize from the mid 1970s to mid 1990s when RAF Belize was subsumed into the remaining British Army garrison. Units included Hardet Belize 1975–6, 1977–1981; No. 1417 Flight RAF (1417 Flt), 1981–1993; Pumadet 1975-1981; No. 1563 Flight RAF (1563 Flt), 1981-mid 1990s; RAF Regiment Shorad squadrons, 1975–1993; Butcher Radar, 1975–6, 1977–1993; various support units: MT, Supply, Medical, ATC, Catering, etc. etc.. The vast majority of units were garrisoned at Airport Camp, adjacent to Philip S.W. Goldson International Airport, but some were deployed at other locations attached to British Army units; typically, Tactical Supply Wing (TSW) for refuelling helicopters, with Tactical Communications Wing (TCW) and Tactical Air Operations Centre (TAOC) providing dispersed communications and close support comms with transport helicopters and ground attack aircraft.

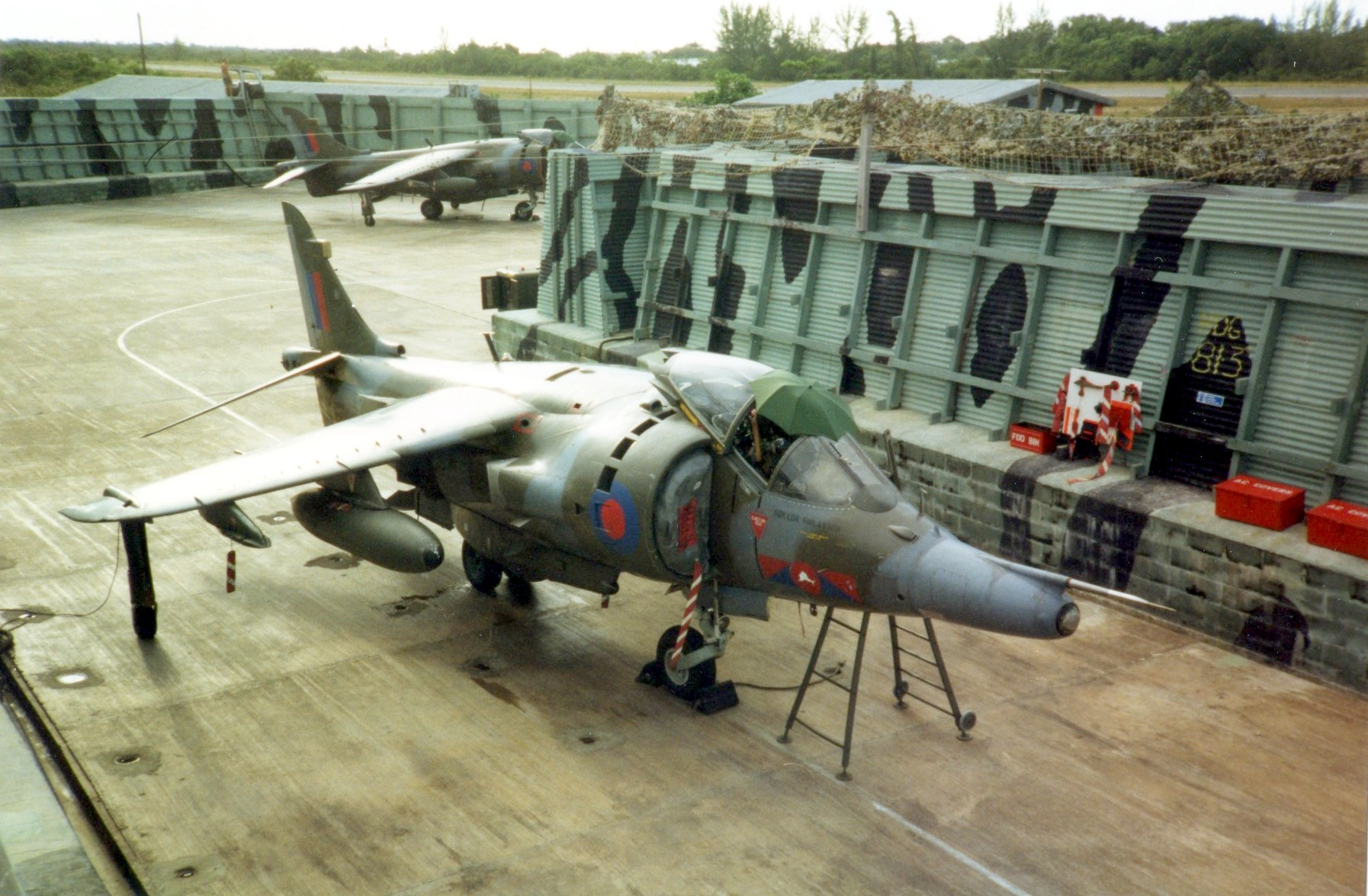
RAF Harrier GR3, RAF Belize, 1990

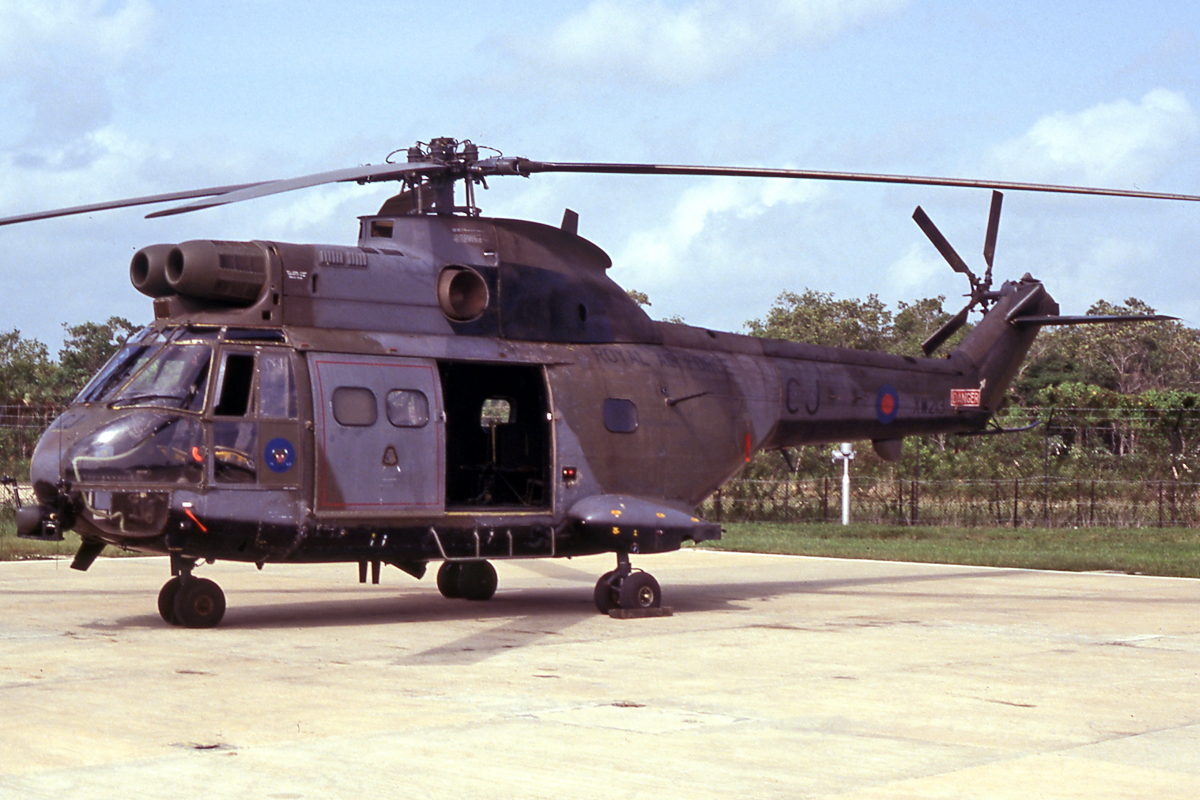
RAF Westland Puma HC.1, RAF Belize, 1991

Aircraft flown by RAF Belize units included the Westland Puma HC.1 and Hawker Siddeley Harrier GR.3, with occasional detachments from No. 39 Squadron RAF with English Electric Canberra PR.9 photo-reconnaissance aircraft. Logistical support from the UK was provided by Vickers VC10 and Lockheed C-130K Hercules transport aircraft and, occasionally, Short Belfast C.1 Strategic Transport aircraft. In the late 1970s and early 1980s some non-urgent logistical transport tasks were sub-contracted to civilian cargo airlines, such as: Redcoat Air Cargo, flying Bristol Britannia freighters. Other British military visitors included Westland Wasp helicopters from various Royal Navy (RN) Caribbean guard-ships. On other occasions flypasts were made by aircraft from HMS Ark Royal before her retirement in 1979.

The Harrier ground attack aircraft of 1417 Flt were dispersed around the airport in camouflaged hides, (hides A to J), initially, but later concentrated at two locations on either side of the runway in self-supporting sub-units: C-D hide (colloquially known as Charlie-Delta) and F-G hide (known as Foxy-Golf). The Puma helicopters of 1563 Flt were based at Williamson Hangar, operating from the airport pan until provided with their own helicopter operating platforms in 1986. Williamson Hangar also formed the hub for all engineering and supply support operations. Weapons storage was co-located with British Army Royal Army Ordnance Corps (RAOC) units at a weapons storage area near Airport Camp. Air traffic control, air defence and fighter control were based at Butcher Radar, with its own surveillance radar, opposite the airport aircraft servicing pan (ASP).

Not part of RAF Belize was the Army Air Corps light helicopter unit, "Teenie Weenie Airways", which operated, variously, Bell 47 AH1 [Sioux], Westland Scout, Westland Lynx and Westland Gazelle helicopters. De Havilland Canada DhC-2[Beaver] Fixed Wing.
