= SJX =

SJX may refer to:

- SJX, the FAA LID code for Beaver Island Airport, Michigan, United States
- SJX, the IATA code for Sarteneja Airport, Belize
- SJX, the ICAO flight code for Starlux Airlines
