= Mze (disambiguation) =

Mže is a river mainly in the Czech Republic.

Mze or MZE may also refer to:

- Mze TV, a television channel
- IATA code MZE, which is assigned to Manatee Airport
- ISO 639-3 code for the Morawa language
- ISO 4217 currency code for the Mozambican escudo
