= Johnny Chan Chen Airstrip =

Airport in Belize

- IATA: none; ICAO: MZJC

Summary
- Airport type: Private
- Serves: Chan Chen, Belize
- Elevation AMSL: 26 ft / 8 m
- Coordinates: 18°26′20″N 88°27′05″W

Map
- Location of airport in Belize

Runways
Direction	Length		Surface
Direction	m	ft	Surface
13/31	1,050	3,445	Grass
- Source: GCM SkyVector

Johnny Chan Chen Airstrip (ICAO: MZJC) is an airport serving Chan Chen, a village in the Corozal District of Belize. The airport is 1.6 kilometres (1 mi) west of Chan Chen and 7 kilometres (4.3 mi) northwest of Corozal.

== See also ==
- Transport in Belize
- List of airports in Belize
