= Big Creek Airport =

Big Creek Airport may refer to:

- Big Creek Airport (Belize) in Big Creek, Belize (IATA: BGK)
- Big Creek Airport (Idaho) in Big Creek, Idaho, United States (FAA: U60)
