= Melinda Airport =

Airport in Belize

- IATA: MDB; ICAO: MZML

Summary
- Airport type: Public
- Serves: Hope Creek, Belize
- Elevation AMSL: 101 ft / 31 m
- Coordinates: 17°00′09″N 88°18′05″W

Map
- Location of Melinda Airport in Belize

Runways
Direction	Length		Surface
Direction	m	ft	Surface
09/26	460	1,509	Gravel
- Source: HERE Maps GCM

Melinda Airport (IATA: MDB, ICAO: MZML) is an airstrip just east of Hope Creek, a village in the Stann Creek District of Belize. The gravel runway is on the south edge of the Melinda Forest Reserve, and just off the Hummingbird Highway.

The Belize VOR-DME (Ident: BZE) is located 32.2 nautical miles (60 km) north of the runway.

== See also ==
- Transport in Belize
- List of airports in Belize
