= Commander of the Defence Force (Belize) =

Professional head of the Belize Defence Force

Commander of the Belize Defence Force
- Incumbent; Brigader General Anthony Velasquez since 29 January 2026
- Belize Defence Force
- Reports to: Minister of National Defence
- Appointer: Governor-General
- Formation: January 1978; 48 years ago
- First holder: Lieutenant colonel Brain W. Ayres
- Deputy: Deputy Commander of the Belize Defence Force
- Website: www.bdf.mil.bz

The Commander of the Defence Force is the professional head of the Belize Defence Force. He is responsible for the administration and the operational control of the Belize Defence Force.

== List of Chiefs ==
No.	Portrait	Commander of the Defence Force	Took office	Left office	Time in office	Ref.
1	Brain W. Ayres	Lieutenant colonel Brain W. Ayres	1978	1980	1–2 years	
2	Graham London	Lieutenant colonel Graham London	1980	1982	1–2 years	
3	Christopher C. Galloway	Lieutenant colonel Christopher C. Galloway	1982	1984	1–2 years	
4	Starmer Smith	Lieutenant colonel Starmer Smith	1984	1986	1–2 years	
5	TDA Veitch	Lieutenant colonel TDA Veitch	1986	1988	1–2 years	
6	Romelly David	Lieutenant colonel Romelly David	1988	1990	1–2 years	
7	Alan Usher	Brigadier general Alan Usher	June 1990	1995	4–5 years	
8	Earl Arthurs	Brigadier general Earl Arthurs	1995	1997	1–2 years	
9	Robert Garcia	Brigadier general Robert Garcia	1997	17 November 2000	2–3 years	
10	Cedric Borland	Brigadier general Cedric Borland	17 November 2000	31 January 2005	4 years, 75 days	
11	Lloyd Gillett	Brigadier general Lloyd Gillett	31 January 2005	30 May 2008	3 years, 120 days	
12	Dario Tapia	Brigadier general Dario Tapia	30 May 2008	1 February 2013	4 years, 247 days	
13	David Nejemiah Jones	Brigadier general David Nejemiah Jones	1 February 2013	26 January 2018	4 years, 359 days	
14	Steven Ortega	Brigadier general Steven Ortega	26 January 2018	21 January 2022	3 years, 360 days	
15	Azariel Loria	Brigadier general Azariel Loria	21 January 2022	Incumbent	4 years, 8 days	
16	Anthony Velasquez	Brigadier general Anthony Velasquez	29 January 2026	Incumbent	252 days	
