= Blackbird Caye Airstrip =

Airstrip serving Turneffe Atoll, Belize

- IATA: none; ICAO: MZBB

Summary
- Airport type: Private
- Serves: Turneffe Atoll, Belize
- Elevation AMSL: 10 ft / 3 m
- Coordinates: 17°19′05″N 87°47′53″W

Map
- Location of airport in Belize

Runways
Direction	Length		Surface
Direction	m	ft	Surface
03/21	740	2,428	Coral sand
- Source: GCM

Blackbird Caye Airstrip (ICAO: MZBB) is an airstrip serving Turneffe Atoll, an atoll 38 kilometres (24 mi) off the coast of Belize. Blackbird Caye is on the eastern side of the atoll, and the airstrip runs along the shore. Approach and departure are over the water.

== See also ==
- Transport in Belize
- List of airports in Belize
