= Chan Chich Airstrip =

Chan Chich Lodge Airstrip
- IATA: none; ICAO: MZGJ

Summary
- Airport type: Private
- Owner: Bowen & Bowen
- Location: Gallon Jug, Belize
- Elevation AMSL: 404 ft / 123 m
- Coordinates: 17°34′00″N 89°02′50″W
- Website: www.chanchich.com

Map
- Location in Belize

Runways
| Direction | Length | | Surface |
| Direction | m | ft | Surface |
|---|---|---|---|
| 11/29 | 955 | 3,133 | Asphalt |
- Sources: Google Maps GCM

Chan Chich Airstrip (ICAO: MZGJ) is an airport serving the Chan Chich Lodge and the Gallon Jug Estate in the Orange Walk District of Belize. The airport is 6 kilometres (4 mi) east of the border with Guatemala.

The Belize VOR-DME (Ident: BZE) is located 42.0 nautical miles (78 km) east of the runway.

== Lodge access ==
The airport is the preferred means of access to the eco-lodge created by Sir Barry Bowen in the private 130,000-acre (530 km^{2}) game park deep in the Belize rain forest, adjacent to the Rio Bravo Conservation area. Arduous tracks accessible by 4WD vehicles are the only other connections from less remote areas. Because driving to Chan Chich requires passing through private lands, access permits must be granted in advance.

The airstrip also serves the wider Gallon Jug community, including the ranch, where efforts are being made to breed a strain of cattle more suited to the tropics by cross-breeding with English Hereford bloodlines.

The lodge has been serving tourists since 1988. A Mayan archeological site is near the lodge.

== See also ==
- Transport in Belize
- List of airports in Belize
