= Northern Two Cayes Airstrip =

- IATA: none; ICAO: MZLH

Summary
- Airport type: Private
- Serves: Northern Caye, Belize
- Elevation AMSL: 19 ft / 6 m
- Coordinates: 17°27′12″N 87°29′55″W

Map
- Location of airstrip in Belize

Runways
Direction	Length		Surface
Direction	m	ft	Surface
08/26	570	1,870	Sand
- Source: GCM

Northern Two Cayes Airstrip (ICAO: MZLH) is a public use airport serving Northern Caye, the largest island of the Lighthouse Reef off Belize.

== See also ==
- Transport in Belize
- List of airports in Belize
