= San Ignacio Town Airstrip =

Airport in Belize

San Ignacio Town Airstrip Maya Flats Airstrip
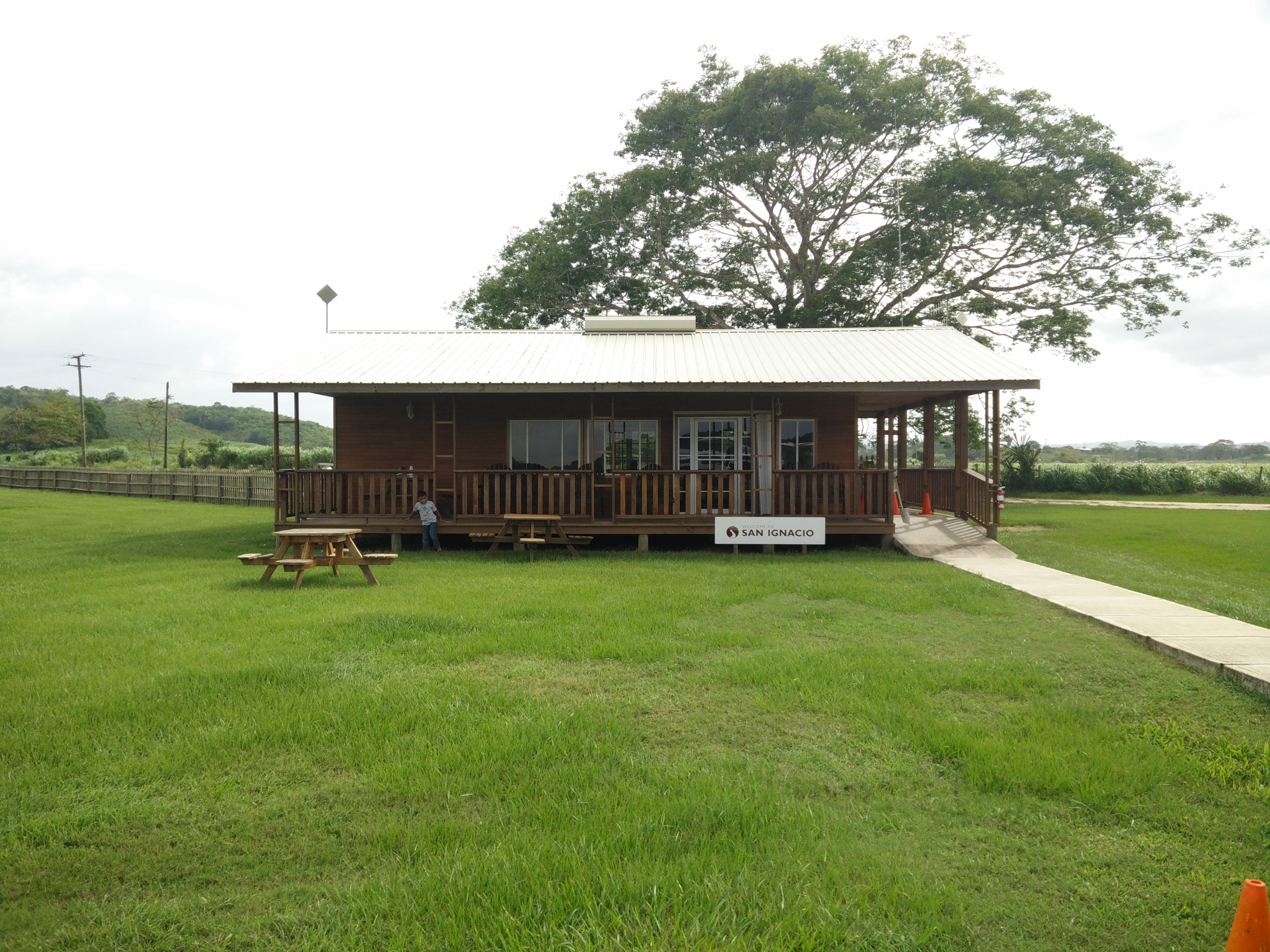
- IATA: CYD; ICAO: MZMF

Summary
- Airport type: Private
- Serves: San Ignacio, Belize
- Elevation AMSL: 351 ft / 107 m
- Coordinates: 17°06′17″N 89°06′05″W

Map
- Location of airport in Belize

Runways
Direction	Length		Surface
Direction	m	ft	Surface
08/26	750	2,461	Asphalt
- Source: GCM

San Ignacio Town Airstrip (IATA: CYD, ICAO: MZMF) is a public use airport serving San Ignacio, a town in the Cayo District of Belize. The airport is 6 kilometres (4 mi) southwest of San Ignacio and 5 kilometres (3.1 mi) east of the border with Guatemala.

It has a 718-meter runway and a small terminal building. Founded in 2012, it is operated by Tropic Air and served exclusively by this airline with single-engine Cessna 208 aircraft.

== See also ==
- Transport in Belize
- List of airports in Belize
