= Hurricane Iris =

Category 4 Atlantic hurricane in 2001

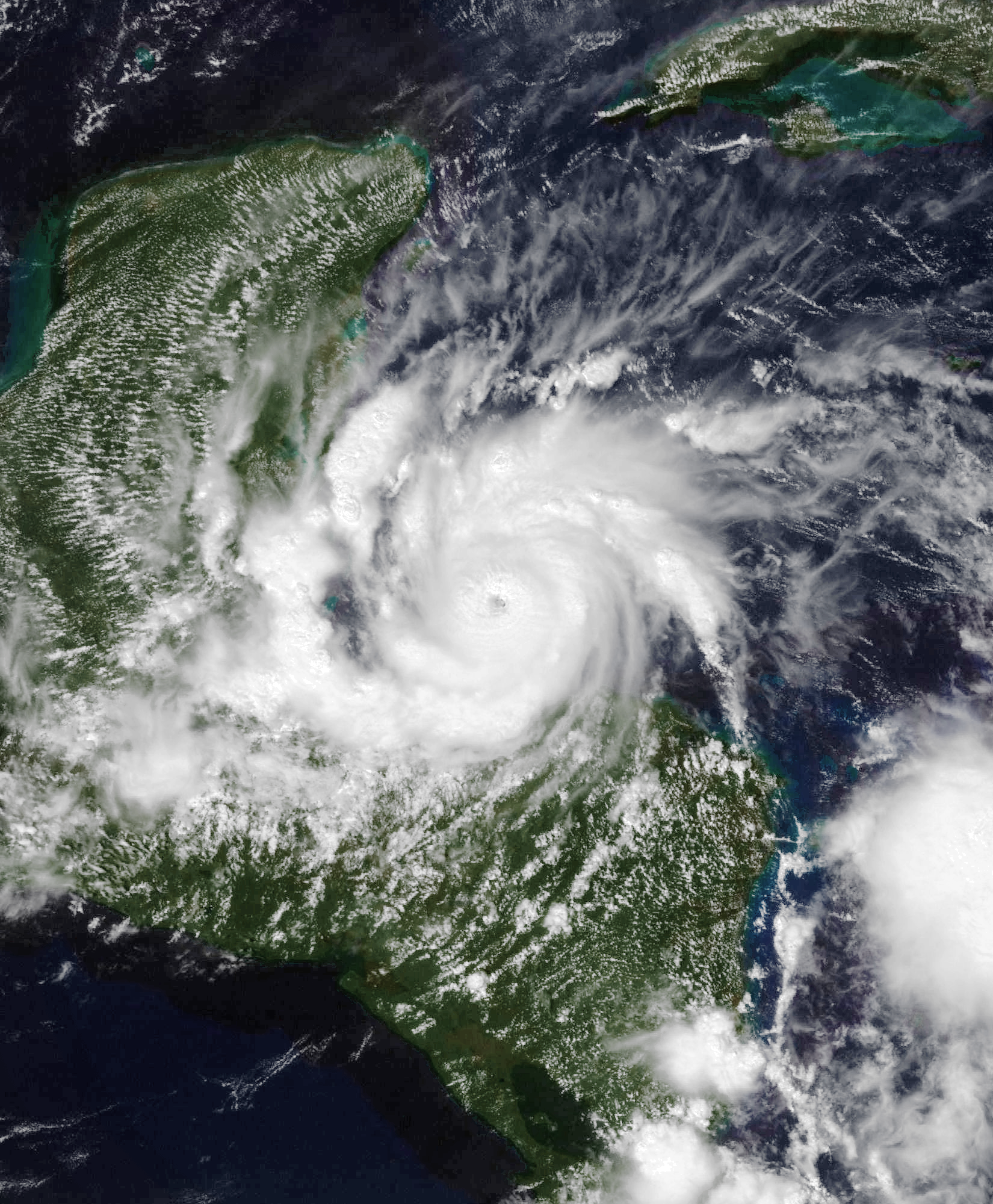
- Iris near peak intensity shortly before landfall in Belize on October 8

Meteorological history
- Formed: October 4, 2001
- Dissipated: October 9, 2001

Category 4 major hurricane
- 1-minute sustained (SSHWS/NWS)
- Highest winds: 145 mph (230 km/h)
- Lowest pressure: 948 mbar (hPa); 27.99 inHg

Overall effects
- Fatalities: 36 direct
- Damage: $250 million (2001 USD)
- Areas affected: Windward Islands, Hispaniola, Jamaica, Honduras, Belize, Guatemala, Eastern Mexico
- IBTrACS
- Part of the 2001 Atlantic hurricane season

Hurricane Iris was a small, but powerful tropical cyclone that caused widespread destruction in Belize. Iris was the second-strongest storm of the 2001 Atlantic hurricane season, behind Hurricane Michelle. It was the ninth named storm, fifth hurricane, and third major hurricane (Note: A major hurricane is a tropical cyclone with maximum sustained winds of at least 111 mph (179 km/h), or a Category 3 or higher on the Saffir–Simpson hurricane scale.) of the year, forming from a tropical wave on October 4 just southeast of Barbados. It moved westward through the Caribbean, intensifying into a tropical storm on October 5 south of Puerto Rico, and into a hurricane on the following day. While passing south of the Dominican Republic, Iris dropped heavy rainfall that caused landslides, killing eight people. Later, the hurricane passed south of Jamaica, where it destroyed two houses. On reaching the western Caribbean Sea, Iris rapidly intensified into a Category 4 on the Saffir–Simpson scale. A small hurricane with an eye of only 7 mi (11 km) in diameter, Iris reached peak winds of 145 mph (233 km/h) before making landfall in southern Belize near Monkey River Town on October 9. The hurricane quickly dissipated over Central America, although its remnants contributed to the formation of Tropical Storm Manuel in the eastern Pacific Ocean. The hurricane caused severe damage—destroying homes, flooding streets, and leveling trees—in coastal towns south of Belize City.

Destruction was heaviest in Belize and totaled $250 million (2001 USD). (Note: All damage totals are in 2001 United States dollars unless otherwise noted.) Because Iris was compact, the damage was largely confined to 72% of the houses in the Toledo district and 50% of the houses in the Stann Creek district. The hurricane damaged or destroyed 3,718 homes nationwide, and wrecked more than 95% of the homes in 35 villages in the poorest parts of the country. Iris left about 15,000 people homeless, many receiving assistance from the government and the local Red Cross chapter. High winds also damaged large swaths of forest and crops, mostly affecting the banana industry. Iris killed 24 people in Belize, including 20 who died when a scuba diving boat capsized near Big Creek. The storm also killed eight people and damaged about 2,500 homes in neighboring Guatemala, and later dropped heavy rainfall in southern Mexico, where two people died.

== Meteorological history ==
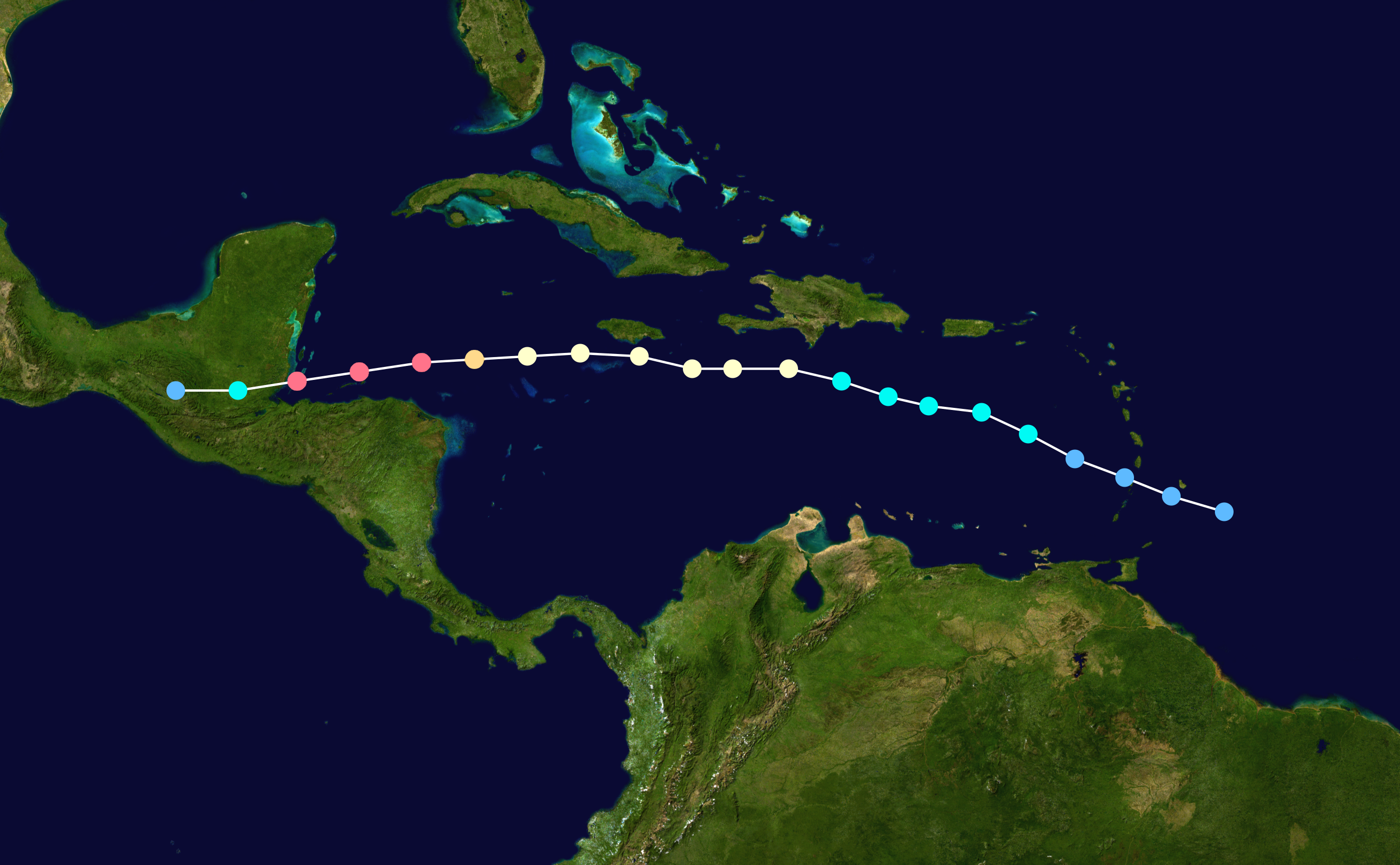
Map plotting the storm's track and intensity, according to the Saffir–Simpson scale Map key Saffir–Simpson scale Tropical depression (≤38 mph, ≤62 km/h) Tropical storm (39–73 mph, 63–118 km/h) Category 1 (74–95 mph, 119–153 km/h) Category 2 (96–110 mph, 154–177 km/h) Category 3 (111–129 mph, 178–208 km/h) Category 4 (130–156 mph, 209–251 km/h) Category 5 (≥157 mph, ≥252 km/h) Unknown Storm type Tropical cyclone Subtropical cyclone Extratropical cyclone, remnant low, tropical disturbance, or monsoon depression

Toward the end of September 2001, a poorly defined tropical wave moved westward across the tropical Atlantic Ocean, through an area of hostile wind shear, which was caused by a large upper-level low within a trough, to the northeast of the Lesser Antilles. A few days later, the upper-level low detached from the trough and moved southwestward over the Caribbean Sea, allowing for an upper-level ridge, or high-pressure area, to form over the tropical wave. The change provided a favorable environment for tropical development, and an area of convection soon blossomed along the wave's axis. As the tropical wave approached the Lesser Antilles, a mid-level wind circulation formed within the deepest part of the convection, and a low-level circulation became gradually more pronounced on satellite imagery. Although its low-level circulation was small and poorly defined, the system increased in organization enough to be classified as Tropical Depression Eleven at 12:00 UTC on October 4, located about 100 mi (160 km) southeast of Barbados. Operationally, however, Hurricane Hunters did not confirm the depression's formation until nine hours later.

In its early stages, the depression moved west-northwestward between the islands of St. Vincent and St. Lucia under the influence of a strong ridge to its north. Compared to its appearance 24 hours before forming, the depression exhibited improved outflow and more distinct convection, although its lower circulation remained very poorly organized. This was confirmed by a Hurricane Hunters flight into the system, which failed to report a closed circulation despite the depression's well-organized appearance on satellite imagery. At 21:00 UTC on October 5, they reported a strengthening circulation with flight-level winds of 74 mph (119 km/h), corresponding to a surface wind intensity of 60 mph (97 km/h). Based on these data, the depression was upgraded to Tropical Storm Iris, situated about 155 mi (249 km) south of the southern coast of Puerto Rico. Iris moved toward the west-northwest at approximately 15 knots. Its trajectory was influenced by a strong subtropical ridge located to the north of the tropical cyclone, which dominated the steering pattern. In post-season analysis, the National Hurricane Center (NHC) estimated that Iris had attained tropical storm status about nine hours earlier.

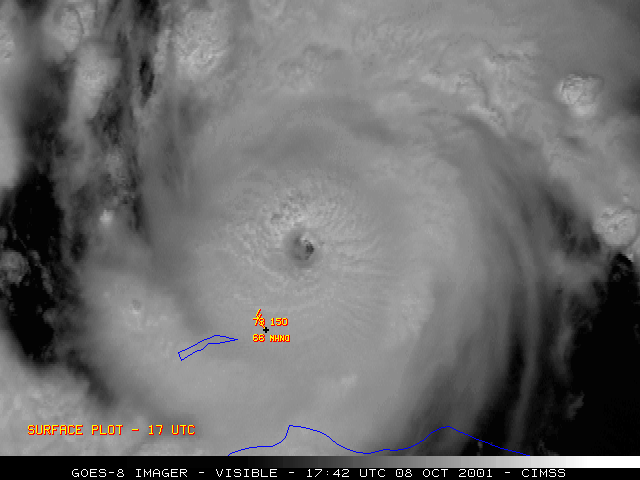
The eye of Iris just north of Honduras, late on October 8

Despite the storm's intensification and well-organized satellite appearance, the circulation failed to become better defined. In their first discussion on Iris, the NHC mentioned the potential for the system to degenerate into a tropical wave if it maintained its fast forward speed. One forecaster noted that the center was fragile and that the cyclone could dissipate quickly if it encountered stronger wind shear to its south. Although its overall appearance did not change significantly, the Hurricane Hunters reported a closed eye with a diameter 23 mi (37 km) and a stadium effect (eyewall curvature) on October 6. Later that day, Iris reached hurricane strength just southwest of the southern tip of the Dominican Republic, and the NHC remarked that land interaction with the Greater Antilles was the only factor impeding further development. After Iris reached winds of 85 mph (137 km/h) early on October 7, its intensity remained steady for about 24 hours. During that time, the satellite appearance became slightly ragged as its outflow became restricted, possibly due to an upper-level low. By late on October 7, the area of hurricane force winds associated with Iris extended only 25 mi (40 km) from its 16 mi (26 km) wide eye.

Early on October 8, after turning west-southwestward away from the Greater Antilles, Iris began strengthening again, with warm waters and an absence of significant wind shear and the NHC predicted peak winds of 105 mph (169 km/h) before the storm would hit Belize. However, Iris instead began to rapidly intensify within the favorable conditions, going from 95 to 140 mph (153 to 225 km/h) in a 12-hour period on October 8, making Iris a Category 4 hurricane on the Saffir-Simpson scale; in the same duration, the minimum central pressure dropped 38 mbar (1.12 inHg). While intensifying, the hurricane developed concentric eyewalls, with an innermost eye having a diameter of 7 mi (11 km). For comparison, the smallest known eye diameter on record for an Atlantic hurricane was about 2 nmi (2.3 mi; 3.7 km), during Hurricane Wilma in 2005. With such a small eye, a Hurricane Hunters flight could not deploy a dropsonde into the center of Iris, and shortly after the flight, the innermost eye collapsed as the core paralleled the Honduras coastline just offshore. This resulted in a temporary and slight weakening during an eyewall replacement cycle, but within a few hours Iris re-intensified to attain peak winds of 145 mph (233 km/h) just off Belize. At 02:00 UTC on October 9, it made landfall at peak intensity in Monkey River Town in the southern portion of Belize. Operationally, it was assessed as having made landfall with winds of 150 mph (240 km/h), though for an unknown reason this was lowered in post-analysis.

Initially, Hurricane Iris was forecast to remain a tropical cyclone while crossing Central America and to re-intensify in the eastern Pacific Ocean; had it done so, it would have retained the name Iris. Instead, the hurricane rapidly weakened after moving into the mountainous terrain of Guatemala, and within six hours of landfall, the hurricane weakened to a tropical storm. Late on October 9, within sixteen hours of landfall, the storm's circulation dissipated over extreme southeastern Mexico. As the remnants approached the Pacific Ocean, a new area of convection developed south of the original circulation of Iris. It gradually organized while continuing westward, developing into Tropical Storm Manuel; the new storm ultimately lasted until October 18, before succumbing to cooler waters and wind shear.

== Preparations ==
Over a stretch of four days, sixteen tropical cyclone watches and warnings were issued in association with Iris, affecting the Dominican Republic, the Cuban provinces of Granma and Santiago de Cuba, Jamaica, Cayman Islands, the Yucatán Peninsula, Guatemala, Honduras and Belize. The threat from Iris prompted the Jamaica National Emergency Operations Center to be activated. Shelters were opened in the country but were ultimately unused.

In Belize, a hurricane warning was issued about 23 hours before Iris moved ashore. A state of national emergency was declared on October 8 as Hurricane Iris neared landfall. All emergency response committees were activated to quickly begin recovery efforts. A mandatory evacuation was issued for Stann Creek and Toledo coastal villages and all offshore islands. The main hospital in Belize City was evacuated as a precaution and the city itself was placed under a voluntary evacuation order. Overall, 11,380 people evacuated their homes in Belize, including many in Belize City. These evacuations were later credited for limiting the death toll. Hurricane Keith had struck the nation a year prior, preparing some citizens for what to expect. Disaster response teams arrived the day after Iris was projected to make landfall. Pan American Health Organization staff were on standby in Belize, Guatemala and Honduras and were ready to respond to any post-storm disease outbreaks.

On October 8, the Government of Honduras declared a red alert for all northern regions, advising residents to expect "extreme weather conditions". About 5,000 people in the country evacuated from their homes. To the north of Belize, officials in Mexico evacuated people from fishing villages and closed ports.

== Impact ==
Death toll by area
State/country	Deaths
Belize	23
Dominican Republic	3
Guatemala	8
Mexico	2
Total	36

=== Lesser and Greater Antilles ===
While Iris was in its development stages, residents as far north as Saint Thomas reported rain and thunderstorms. In the Dominican Republic, Iris dropped around 3 in (76 mm) of rainfall along the coast, forcing 35 families to evacuate their homes after rivers exceeded their banks. The rains triggered a landslide outside of Santo Domingo that destroyed a home, killing a family of three. There was another landslide in the region that injured two people. Iris's passage near Jamaica destroyed two houses and damaged the roofs of two others, causing one injury. Otherwise, damage in the country was minimal.

=== Wave Dancer ===
A 120 ft (37 m) scuba diving boat overturned during the hurricane near Big Creek, Belize, possibly hit by a tornado. The boat, named the Wave Dancer, had 28 people on board, including 20 from the Richmond Dive Club out of Richmond, Virginia; most of them were upstairs in the boat, and none were diving. The captain had delayed returning to shore, and the passengers waited for the storm to pass along a dock, not anticipating the ferocity. Iris cut the ropes connecting the boat to the dock, causing it to overturn in 12 ft (3.7 m) waters. Eight people survived, and 11 bodies were recovered; it was presumed that 20 people died during the wreck, including 15 from the Richmond area and three crew members.

Another boat, the Vendera, also reportedly capsized with people on board.

=== Belize ===
Hurricane Iris moved ashore in Belize with winds of 145 mph (233 km/h), although the highest measured winds were 106 mph (171 km/h) at a station in Big Creek. Because of its small diameter, Iris produced heavy damage only in a 70 mi (110 km) area of southern Belize. In that region, the hurricane produced a storm surge of up to 15 ft (4.6 m), with waves of over 13 ft (4.0 m) in height, causing street flooding and some damage to the offshore cayes.

As it moved ashore, Iris damaged houses and schools in dozens of villages. In 35 villages, the storm destroyed more than 95% of the buildings. Its small size confined the worst damage largely to Toledo and Stann Creek districts, which are the two southernmost and poorest districts of the country. The percentage of damaged houses was 72% in Toledo district and about 50% in Stann Creek, leaving about 15,000 people homeless. In both districts, the storm caused power outages and contaminated water supplies. In the worst-affected areas, poor Mayan people living on farms lost much of what they owned. At Placencia near the coast, about 80% of the homes were destroyed and many of the remaining buildings had roof damage, with downed power poles in the streets. About 90% of the houses in nearby Seine Bight were destroyed, and where Iris made landfall, over 90% of the homes were destroyed throughout Monkey River Town. The storm damaged several roads and fishing piers in southern Belize. Iris also damaged tourism facilities, including minor impact to the Maya ruins of Belize, and damaged 20% of the hotel rooms in the country, accounting for $37 million in losses. The remainder of the country remained generally unaffected during the storm.

In southern Belize, the storm's strong winds left crop damage, in some cases where the harvest had just begun. About 5,000 acres (2,000 ha) of bananas were destroyed, along with over 3,500 acres (1,400 ha) of rice, 3,000 acres (1,200 ha) of corn, and other crops to a lesser degree. The storm also flooded fields and killed several livestock. The shrimp industry lost 25% of its catch, partly due to contaminated waters. Crop damage in Belize was estimated at $103 million, mostly from banana losses. Iris's strong winds also damaged large swaths of forest, with upwards of 40% of trees affected in some areas. This disrupted the habitats of several animals, and it is likely that many of the howler monkeys near Monkey River were killed. The storm's strong waves eroded the beach, although marine effects were much less than those of Hurricane Keith in the previous year. Nevertheless, there were reports of fish die-offs after the storm, possibly from low oxygen due to too much decaying matter.

Nationwide, Iris damaged or destroyed 3,718 homes, directly affecting a total of 21,568 people, or 8.5% of the total population. The storm damaged or destroyed 31 schools and 17 health facilities, along with 21 government buildings. There was about $25 million in damage to the transportation sector, including highways and bridges. Iris killed 24 people in and around the country, including the victims of the Wave Dancer shipwreck. Overall damage was estimated at $250 million, making it the most damaging storm in the country since Hurricane Hattie in 1961.

=== Elsewhere in Central America ===
High tides and heavy rainfall caused power outages across both Guatemala and Honduras. In the former, the hurricane's rainfall generally amounted to 3 to 4 in (76 to 102 mm), triggering flash flooding and landslides that injured nearly 100 people. The damage was heaviest in Petén Department in the northern portion of the country. The storm damaged 26 schools and 2,500 homes in the country's interior. An estimated 27,500 people were affected by the storm throughout Guatemala. There were eight deaths in the country, two of them the result of falling trees.

The remnants of Iris dropped heavy rainfall over southern Mexico, accumulating 4.80 in (122 mm) in the southern state of Chiapas. In Oaxaca, the storm produced heavy rains and damaged a total of 120 houses. A mudslide in one village demolished 20 homes and killed a child, while elsewhere in the state a man drowned after being swept away in a flooded river.

== Aftermath ==
On October 9, the government of Belize issued the "all clear" signal, indicating that the storm had fully passed, and began reconstruction efforts and damage assessment. The government declared Stann Creek and Toledo districts as disaster areas, and officials declared a nighttime curfew. By the day after the storm struck, the airport in Belize City had been reopened, and transportation in all but the southern portion of the country returned to normal. Residents in the southern part of the country lost access to fresh water, forcing them to drink unclean water. Officials sent medical teams to southern Belize in the most affected areas. The Belmopan Red Cross issued an appeal for residents to donate money, clothing, and food for storm victims. The Red Cross also set up shelters and gave food to more than 7,000 people. By October 19, most roads in southern Belize were reopened. The Belize government printed a new postage stamp to help pay for reconstruction costs, and officials authorized spending $1.2 million to rebuild damaged homes. To assist the farmers who lost crops, the Belize government provided 18,000 lb (8,200 kg) of maize seeds, as well as fertilizer. After the storm, the World Food Programme and the Belize Red Cross collectively provided food for the 9,000 families in need of subsidence. By October 31, the Red Cross had provided blankets, tarps, and hygienic supplies to 4,800 people severely affected by the storm. Homes were gradually repaired, and crop production returned to normal by early 2002. Around Christmas of 2001, the Belize Red Cross provided presents to school children in 14 villages affected by the storm. The lost banana crop caused sales to decrease by 22% in 2002, although sales gradually recovered.

The government of Belize issued an appeal to the international community for assistance in the days following Iris's landfall, and various countries provided aid. The United Kingdom sent a helicopter to assist in damage assessment and a crew to clean the water. The United States also sent a crew for damage assessment and donated plastic sheeting. Although sustaining significant damage, the Government of Guatemala deployed a working team with members from throughout the country to assist in recovery in Belize. Mexico sent blankets, mattresses, food, and water, as well as a medical team. The Japanese government sent tents and blankets, and the Chinese government donated 500 lb (230 kg) of rice and dried fruits. Various United Nations departments donated about $225,000.

The American victims of the Wave Dancer boat wreck were flown back to the Richmond, Virginia area following the storm. The insurance company covering the boat reached a $4 million settlement, which was disbursed among the survivors and the victims' families. The boat operator remained in business following the accident.

=== Retirement ===
On account of the damage left behind by the hurricane in Guatemala and Belize, the name Iris was retired in the spring of 2002 by the World Meteorological Organization and will never again be used for a North Atlantic tropical cyclone. It was replaced with Ingrid for the 2007 season.

== See also ==
- List of Category 4 Atlantic hurricanes
- 1931 British Honduras hurricane – deadly hurricane that struck the nation.
- Hurricane Greta–Olivia (1978) – damaging hurricane that took a similar track.
- Hurricane Nana (2020) – Another hurricane that made almost an identical track.
