= Big Creek Airport (Belize) =

Airport in Belize

- IATA: BGK; ICAO: MZBG

Summary
- Airport type: Public
- Serves: Big Creek, Belize
- Elevation AMSL: 22 ft / 7 m
- Coordinates: 16°31′12″N 88°24′33″W

Map
- Location in Belize

Runways
Direction	Length		Surface
Direction	m	ft	Surface
11/29	965	3,166	Asphalt
- Source: GCM

Big Creek Airport (IATA: BGK, ICAO: MZBG) is an airport serving Big Creek, a sea port in the Toledo District of Belize.

== Airlines and destinations ==
Airlines	Destinations
Maya Island Air	Belize City–International, Dangriga, Punta Gorda

== See also ==
- Transport in Belize
- List of airports in Belize
