= Belize Coast Guard =

Maritime law enforcement agency

- Logo of the Coast Guard
- Abbreviation: BCG
- Motto: Utrinque Paratus; Ready for Anything

Agency overview
- Formed: 28 November 2005; 20 years ago
- Employees: 630 (2019 approx)

Jurisdictional structure
- National agency: Belize
- Operations jurisdiction: Belize
- Constituting instrument: Belize National Coast Guard Service (Amendment) Act, 2016
- Specialist jurisdiction: Coastal patrol, marine border protection, marine search and rescue

Operational structure
- Headquarters: 4.5 Miles George Price Highway, Belize City, Belize
- Minister responsible: Hon. Florencio Marin Jr., Minister of National Security
- Agency executive: Captain Elton Bennet, Commandant
- Parent agency: Ministry National Security

Website
- bcg.gov.bz

The Belize Coast Guard (until 2016, the Belize National Coast Guard Service) is the maritime security, search and rescue, and the maritime and law enforcement service branch of Belize. The BCG operates under the Ministry of Home Affairs.

The current Commandant of the Belize Coast Guard is Captain Elton Bennett.

== History ==
The new service began operations with seven impounded Eduardoño fast craft and 50 men drawn from the disbanded Belize Defence Force Maritime Wing. The Coast Guard was originally established as a part of Belize Defence Force established in November 2005 with the assistance of the United States Coast Guard.

It became a branch independent from BDF in November 2005.

== Missions ==
Coast Guard men and women are deployed around the clock patrolling the internal waters and territorial seas. On the northern frontier, their joint operating base at Consejo protects the local economy from the negative impacts of illegal contraband and acts as the northern cut off for drug trafficking. On their southern boundary they stand guard at the Sarstoon river ensuring sovereignty and territorial integrity of Belize. They stand ready for anything (Utrinque Paratus).

The Belize Coast Guard mission includes:

- Maritime safety
- Maritime security
- Marine Conservation
- Maintaining sovereignty of Belize sea space
- Naval defence of Belize

Like other naval forces in the region, the BCG mostly confronts crime at sea. “What occupies most of their time is really the transnational organised crime in the form of drug trafficking and weapon smuggling. The BCG also works to prevent illegal fishing and other illicit activity affecting the Belizean maritime ecosystem, supporting the Belize.

The Coast Guard Service coordinates its activities with the Belize Defence Force and the Belize Police Department.

== Organization ==
The force has its Headquarters (HQ) on the outskirts of Belize City where storage and maintenance facilities for its boats are also found. Coming under the HQ are the CSOG, the fleet command also known as First Fleet, and the service and support group, which includes the training company handling recruit training, stores, and equipment supplies, as well as the maintenance component of the BCG.

The First Fleet includes an HQ and is broken down into northern, central, and southern sectors, each comprising three 30-man platoons. These are made up of boat teams and boarding teams, with each sector providing them with a pool of two Justice 370s and four other craft for operations. One platoon is usually on operation, with another training and the third on leave.

Each sector is responsible for the operation of several forward operating bases: six being coastguard stations, while seven are joint facilities where the BCG works alongside the BDF (Belize Defence Force), the Belize Fisheries Department, customs officials, and NGOs. Directly under the First Fleet commandant is the Strike Team: an eight-man special operations unit specialising in maritime interdiction, counter-narcotics missions, and amphibious operations. Stood up in 2016, it is now slated for amalgamation into the CSOG to consolidate all BCG special operations assets within a single unit. A platoon-sized force, CSOG was formed in 2013 to respond to the degrading security situation in the north of the island of Ambergris Caye. “Different gangs would clash over drugs washed ashore. People would be found in shallow graves. They would harass the locals with home invasions, steal their boats, and sell them in Mexico.

=== Belize Coast Guard SEALs ===
A selection and training course run by US Navy SEAL personnel saw eight BCG personnel graduate as Belizean SEALs, becoming the founding members of the unit. By 2014 CSOG was deploying in the field, gathering intelligence and carrying out offensive operations that led to a gradual drop in crime in northern Ambergris Caye. Since then more personnel have been trained and the unit has grown.

Armed with M4A1 rifles, FN M249 Squad Automatic Weapons, M240 machine guns, and Remington Model 700 sniper rifles, CSOG operatives are as proficient in maritime operations as they are in land deployments such as long-range reconnaissance and close-quarter combat.

== Personnel ==
As of November 2019, the Coast Guard service has a strength of 600 men and women, referred to as "guardsmen."

As the Coast Guard broadens its scope it is evident that there is a need to increase its strength. In November 2019 they graduated the largest class since existence. Eighty five recruits joined their ranks. In addition to personnel administration, one hundred and six persons were promoted across the ranks.

Their international partners also play a crucial role in supporting the Belize Coast Guard. Their professional military education and training is a result of the international relationship that remains strong through 2020. The United States of America, Mexico, the United Kingdom, Canada and Taiwan, at the Multi National Security Conference in September 2019 have all committed to continue to support the Belize Coast Guard. In that regard, one hundred and six (or 20%) Coast Guard personnel has been overseas for training and exercises in 2019.

Commandant of the Belize Coast Guard is Captain Elton Bennett.

== Ranks ==
=== Commissioned Officers ===
Rank group	General / flag officers		Senior officers			Junior officers
Belize Coast Guard
Belize Coast Guard	Rear admiral	Rear admiral (lower half)	Captain	Commander	Lieutenant commander	Lieutenant	Lieutenant (junior grade)	Ensign

=== Enlisted ===
Rank group	Senior NCOs					Junior NCOs		Enlisted
Belize Coast Guard
Belize Coast Guard	Master chief petty officer	Senior chief petty officer	Chief petty officer	Petty officer first class	Petty officer second class	Petty officer third class	Seaman	Seaman apprentice

== Bases ==
- Headquarters

The chief base of the Belize Coast Guard Service is located at mile 4 on the Western Highway. Belize Coastguard gets a place to call headquarters | Channel5Belize.com

The new headquarters was built with the assistance from the US southern command. It was formerly located at Ladyville.

- Calabash Caye

The Forward Operating Base at Calabash Caye was inaugurated on March 17, 2010. It was built at a cost of $3,000.000.00. National Coastguard’s $3 million outpost on Calabash Caye | Channel5Belize.com. Boats are stationed at Caye Caulker and San Pedro under the operational control of Ladyville.

- San Pedro

On Friday, November 29, 2013, the Belize Coast Guard (as part of their 8th anniversary celebrations) inaugurated its northern Forward Operating Base on Ambergris Caye and also held the graduation ceremony of its fourth intake.

- Bacalar Chico

The Belize Coast Guard (BCG) officially opened its new patrol base on Friday, July 26. The new outlook post in the Bacalar Chico area, a mile and a half away from the Mexican border, will not only serve to patrol the northern coast of the island, but also deter any sort of criminal activities that threaten the safety and economic progress of Ambergris Caye

- Hunting Caye

Hunting Caye is located at the southern apex of the Belize and northern Honduras/Guatemala maritime border and it provides that forward deployment from where they can project sea power in encountering transnational organized crime.

== Equipment ==
In 2007, the Coast Guard Service had eight boats in commission. There are no aircraft; for air searches the Coast Guard Service relies on the Belize Defence Force. The Belize Coast Guard Service received several fast boats from the United States Coast Guard in 2008. These boats have a maximum speed of 60 to 65 miles per hour (100 to 108 km/h).The Belize Coast Guard inaugurated a new facility on December 2, 2013.Belize Coast Guard inaugurates new facility and graduates 30 - The San Pedro Sun

=== Plans ===
The Belize National Coast Guard, along with growing its strength in numbers, is also looking to expand its fleet of naval vessels. Maritime law enforcement agency will procure a pair of patrol boats through a loan from the Central American Bank for Economic Integration. The CABEI loan, as it is called, will allow the Ministry of National Security to upgrade a number of facilities and acquire other assets across all branches of law enforcement. The Sea Axe Class vessels are considerably larger than the Boston Whalers currently in use by the coast guard and will allow for wider coverage of Belizean waters. While Belize is in talks with Mexico to acquire both ships, no date has been set for their procurement.

=== Logistic vehicles ===
Name	Image	Origin	Type	Variants	Quantity	Notes
Utility vehicles
Ford F250		United States	Utility truck	F250	2	Donated United States in 2020. Two trucks to the Belize Coast Guard.
Toyota Hilux		Japan	Pickup truck		1	assigned to the administration.
Ambulance
Toyota Land Cruiser		Japan	Military ambulance	J70	1	Donated United States one ambulance to the Belize Coast Guard.

=== Weapons ===
Model	Image	Origin	Variant	Caliber	Details
Handguns
FN35		Belgium	Semi-automatic pistol	9mm	Standard army pistol.
Assault rifles
M4A1		United States	Carbine	5.56mm	M4s/M4A1s sold as part of a 2006 Foreign Military Sales package. More M4/M4A1s announced to be sold via FMS program in 2017
M16A2		United States	Assault rifle	5.56mm	Uses assault rifles M16A1 and M16A2
Machine guns
FN MAG		Belgium	General-purpose machine gun	7.62mm	
M249		United States	Light machine gun	5.56mm	
M2 Browning		United States	Heavy machine gun	.50 BMG (12.7×99mm NATO)	Uses Belize army special boat unit and coast guard, as the main weapon of the boats.
Sniper rifles
Remington 700		United States	Bolt action rifle	308 Winchester	

== Drones Squadron ==
Name	Origin	Type	Type	Notes
Patrol drones
Skyfront	United States	Unmanned aerial vehicles	Perimeter 8+ UAV	The Belize Coast Guard drone squadron with Perimeter 8+ unmanned aerial vehicles (UAVs), acquired with the help of the United States through California-based military robotics firm Skyfront.

== Coast Guard Fleet ==
Class	Photo	Origin	Type	Boats	In service	Notes
Coastal patrol
SAFE Defender Class		United States	Patrol boat	2011	2	In November 2011, the Coast Guard received two Boston Whaler Outrage Justice Series boats, two SAFE Defender Class boats, two F-550 Ford trucks, and a 40-foot container filled with spare parts.
Boston Whaler		United States	Patrol boat	Justice 37 2010	4	In April 2010, the Coast Guard received two Boston Whaler Justice 37' patrol boats. Shortly they received an additional "Justice" and two Secure All-around Flotation Equipped (SAFE) boats.
Bradley Pelican marine		Belize	28-foot patrol boat	CG28 Tiburon (2019)	1	September 25, 2019, Oceana Belize has facilitated the donation of a 28’ Bradley Pelican marine vessel, Tiburon, powered by two 115 horse power outboard engines, to the Belize Coast Guard in an effort to combat illegal fishing, piracy and drug trafficking in Belize's waters.
Eduardoño-type		Colombia	Patrol boat	2008	8	The coast guard is in the middle of reorganizing and restructuring and replacing its current fleet of boats. Now operate a set of fleet of 8 Eduardono refurbished vessels.
		United States	Patrol boat	2008		The Belize Coast Guard Service received several fast boats from the United States Coast Guard in 2008. These boats have a maximum speed of 60 to 65 miles per hour (100 to 108 km/h).
Special purpose
Zodiac		United States	RIB	2015	8	In December 2015, the Belize Coast Guard received about eight zodiac floatable vessels, two hundred life vests, an equal number of rain protective gears, and outboard motors. They also received body armors, tactical floatation devices, night vision devices, surveillance cameras and laptop computer equipment which will be used by the coast guard SEALs.
