= Matthew Spain Airport =

Airport in Belize

- IATA: SQS; ICAO: MZCF

Summary
- Airport type: Public
- Serves: San Ignacio, Belize
- Elevation AMSL: 199 ft / 61 m
- Coordinates: 17°11′09″N 89°00′35″W

Map
- Location of airport in Belize

Runways
Direction	Length		Surface
Direction	m	ft	Surface
08/26	695	2,280	Asphalt
- Source: Landings.com Google Maps GCM

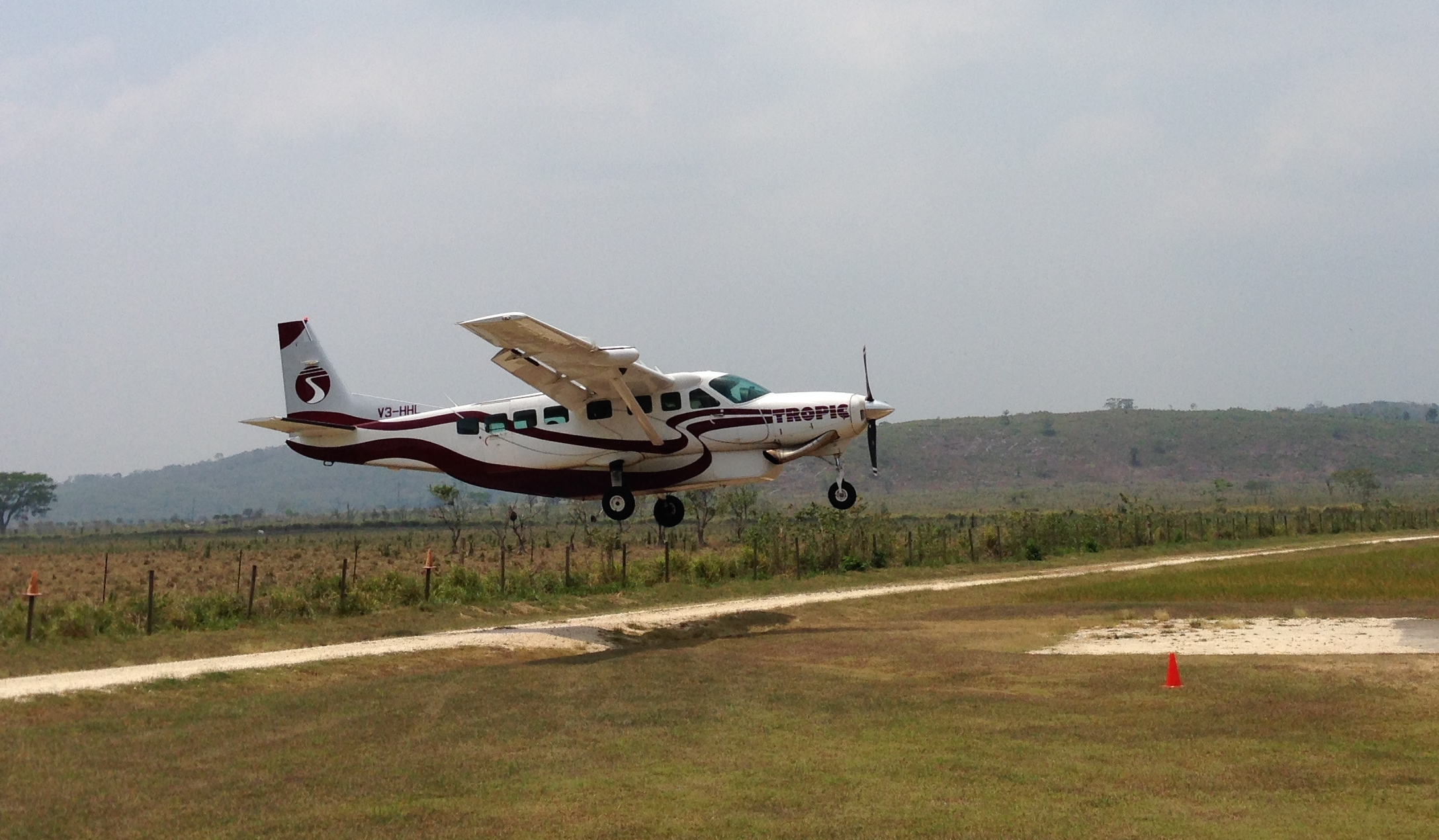
Tropic Air Cessna Grand Caravan arriving at Maya Flats Air Park in Cayo District of Belize

Matthew Spain Airport (IATA: SQS, ICAO: MZCF), formerly called Central Farm Airstrip, is a public use airport serving San Ignacio, a town in the Cayo District of Belize. The airport is 5 kilometres (3 mi) northeast of Santa Elena.

The Belize VOR-DME (Ident: BZE) is located 45.1 nautical miles (84 km) east-northeast of the runway.

== Airline and destinations ==
At the moment (April 2024), there are no scheduled services to San Ignacio.

== See also ==
- Transport in Belize
- List of airports in Belize
