= British Army Training Support Unit Belize =

Jungle warfare training garrison

- Price Barracks, Ladyville, Belize
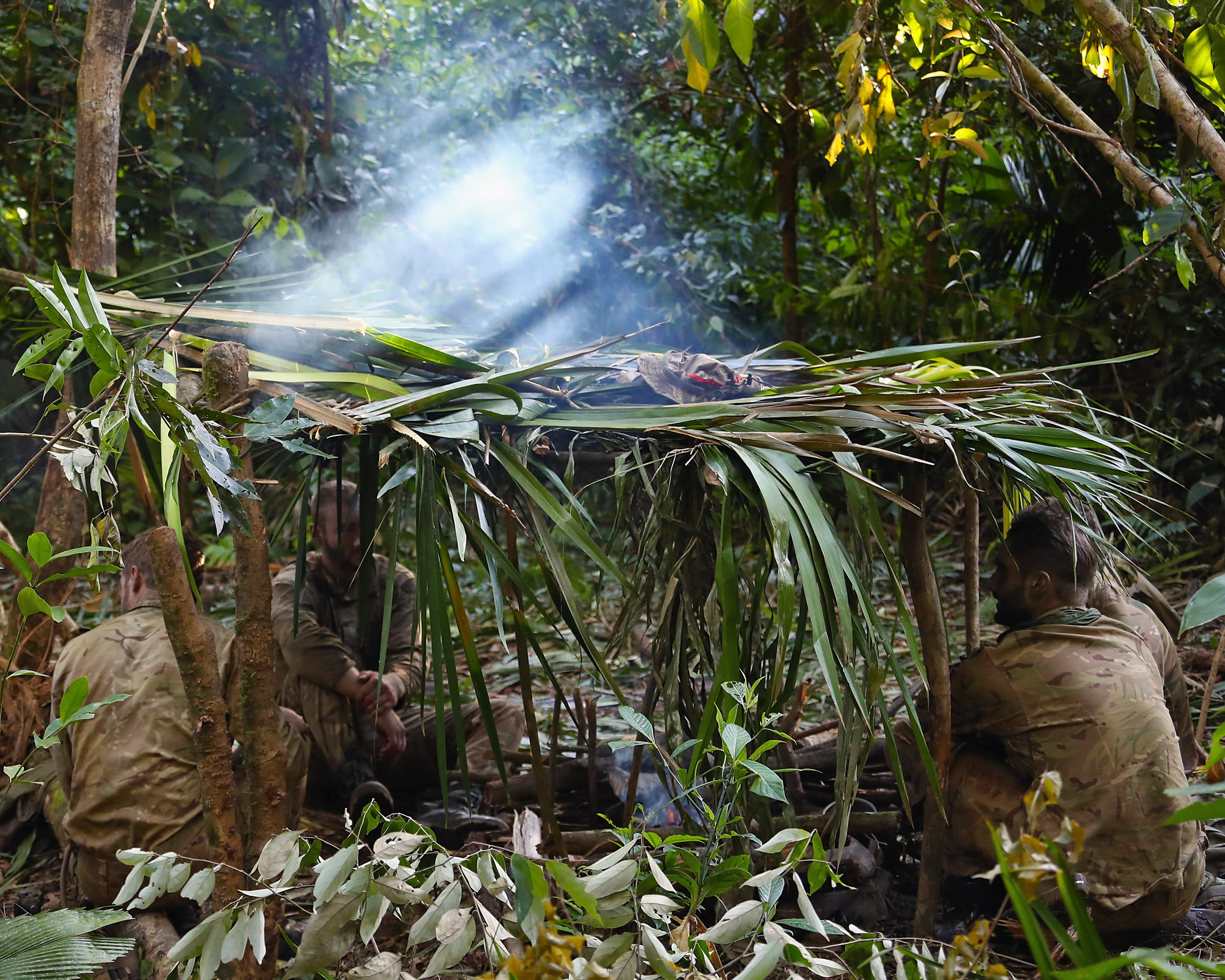
- Royal Marines in the jungle of Belize in January 2017.

Site information
- Owner: Ministry of Defence
- Operator: British Army
- Website: www.army.mod.uk/learn-and-explore/global-operations/belize/

Location
- Location within Belize
- Coordinates: 17°32′37″N 88°18′22″W

Site history
- Built: 1994
- In use: 1994–present

British Army Training Support Unit Belize (BATSUB), the successor of the former British Forces Belize, is the name given to the current British Army Garrison in Belize. The garrison is used primarily for jungle warfare training, with access to over 13,000 square kilometres (5,000 sq mi) of jungle terrain, provided by the government of Belize.

BATSUB is located near Belize International Airport, at Price Barracks, Ladyville.

== History ==
=== British Forces Belize ===
Belize – formerly 'British Honduras' – gained its independence from Britain in September 1981. However, Britain retained a deterrent force – British Forces Belize – to protect Belize from the threat of invasion from Guatemala to the south, which did and still does, claim Belize to be its own.

The British Army Training Support Unit Belize (BATSUB), formed in 1994, is a successor to British Forces Belize, which was structured as such in 1989:

British Army Forces in Belize

- 1st Battalion, Welsh Guards, on six month roulement.
- 1 x Armoured Reconnaissance Troop, six month roulement.
- 1 x Field Battery, Royal Artillery, six month roulement.
- 1 x Field Squadron, Royal Engineers, six month roulement.
- Detachment 2 Postal & Courier Regiment Royal Engineers, FPO Belize, BFPO 12
- 24th Squadron, Royal Corps of Transport.
- 78th Ordnance Company, Royal Army Ordnance Corps.
- No. 25 Flight, Army Air Corps.

Royal Navy Forces – Belize:

- West Indies Guard Ship, as needed.

Royal Air Force – Belize:

- No. 1417 Flight RAF
- No. 1563 Flight RAF
- 1 Air Defence Flight, RAF Regiment, six month roulement.

=== Recent ===
In 2010, the UK government announced it would mothball the facility as part of the 2010 Strategic Defence and Security Review. However, in 2015, reports indicated that BATSUB was seeing "increased usage". In November 2015, the UK government announced it was re-establishing the facility as part of its 2015 Strategic Defence and Security Review. According to some Belizean media reports, the British decision to re-establish BATSUB could have been linked to rising tensions between Belize and Guatemala.

Under the Integrated Review paper announced by the UK Government in March 2021, Belize is to become a 'land hub', and could have personnel deployed more regularly and for longer durations. The unit is currently commanded by a lieutenant colonel.

== See also ==
- Belize–United Kingdom relations
- Overseas military bases of the United Kingdom
