= Northern Caye =

Coordinates: 17°26′41″N 87°30′15″W

Northern Caye is an island of the Lighthouse Reef Atoll 50 miles (80 km) off the coast of Belize. The former Lighthouse Reef Resort (closed 2005) catered to scuba diving enthusiasts. The caye is noted for its saltwater crocodiles and snowy egrets.

It is part of a group of islands known as The Northeast Caye.

It has an area of 526 hectares. At the census of population 2012 it had a population of 6.

The island is served by Northern Two Cayes Airstrip.

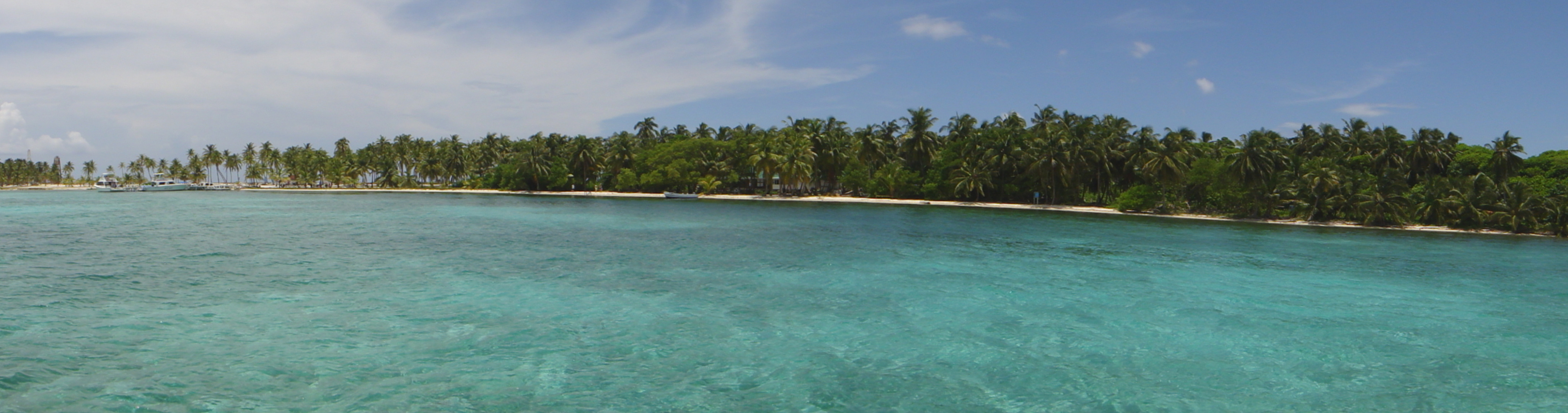
Northern Caye
