= Hector Silva Airstrip =

Airport in Belmopan, Belize

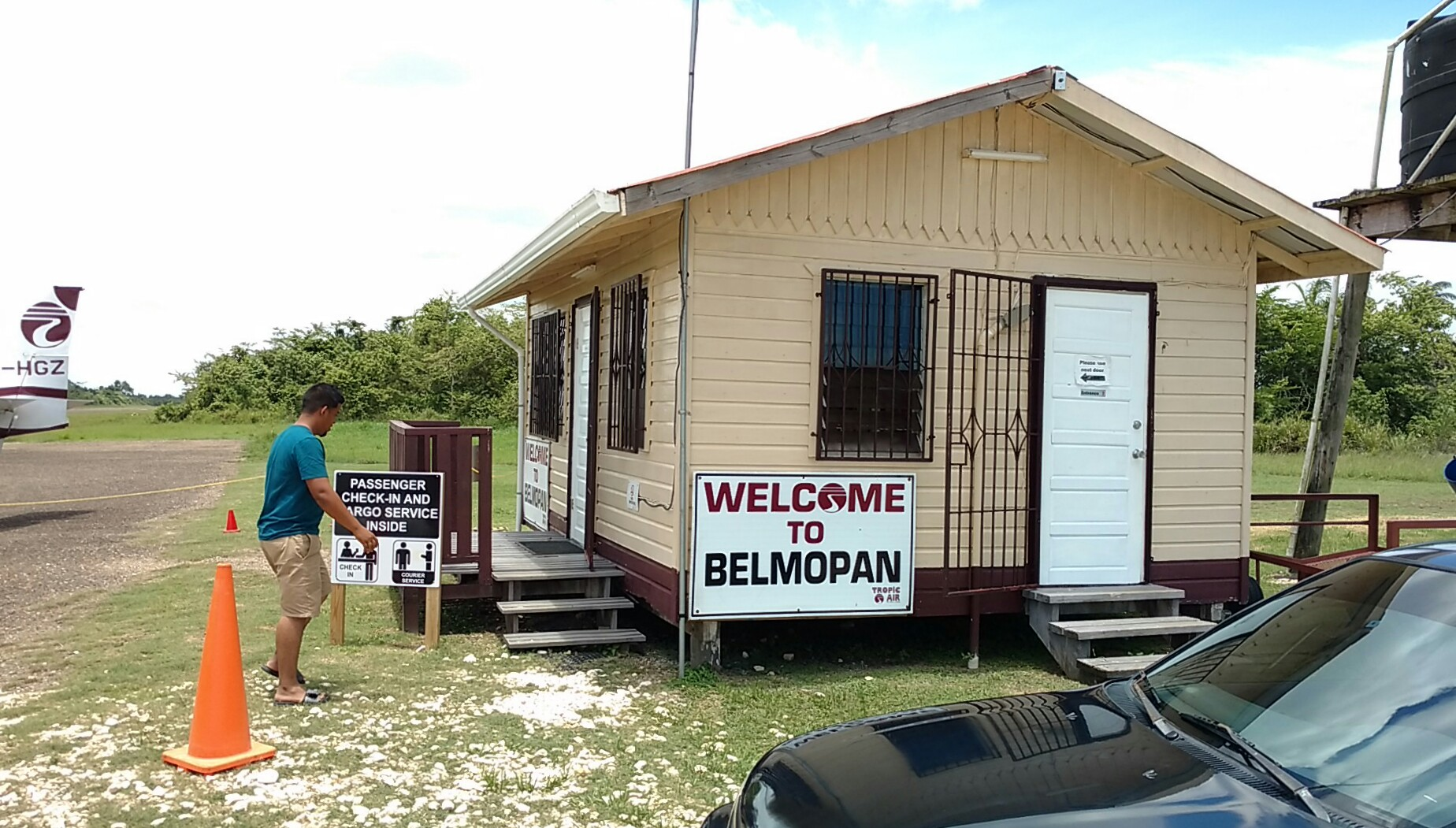
- Belmopan Hector Silva Airstrip Terminal
- IATA: BCV; ICAO: MZBP

Summary
- Location: Belmopan
- Elevation AMSL: 150 ft / 46 m
- Coordinates: 17°16′10″N 88°46′35″W

Map
- Location in Belize

Runways
Direction	Length		Surface
Direction	m	ft	Surface
11/29	1,110	3,642	Asphalt
- Source: GCM Google Maps OurAirports

Hector Silva airstrip (IATA: BCV, ICAO: MZBP) is an airport located in Cayo District serving Belmopan, the capital city of Belize. The runway is on the northern edge of the city off the George Price Highway, and has a small terminal building.

Belize Defence Forces use the airstrip for temporary landing facilities for their aircraft. It was expanded by the British army in 2002, in order to accept larger planes such as the Lockheed C-130 Hercules.

The Belize VOR-DME (Ident: BZE) is located 31.0 nautical miles (57 km) northeast of the runway.

== Airline and destinations ==
At the moment (May 2024), there are no scheduled services to Belmopan.

== See also ==
- Transport in Belize
- List of airports in Belize
