= Sarteneja Airport =

Airport in Belize

- IATA: SJX; ICAO: MZSJ

Summary
- Airport type: Public
- Serves: Sarteneja
- Elevation AMSL: 16 ft / 5 m
- Coordinates: 18°21′20″N 88°07′50″W

Map
- Location in Belize

Runways
Direction	Length		Surface
Direction	m	ft	Surface
10/28	765	2,510	Asphalt
- GCM

Sarteneja Airport (IATA: SJX, ICAO: MZSJ) is an airport serving Sarteneja, a town in the Corozal District in northern Belize. The airport is just east of the town, which is on Chetumal Bay.

== Airlines and destinations ==
Airlines	Destinations
Tropic Air	Belize City–Municipal, Corozal, San Pedro

== See also ==
- List of airports in Belize
- Transport in Belize
