= Manatee Airport =

Airport in Belize

- IATA: MZE; ICAO: MZSL

Summary
- Airport type: Private
- Serves: Spanish Lookout, Belize
- Elevation AMSL: 343 ft / 105 m
- Coordinates: 17°16′42″N 89°1′25″W

Map
- Location of Manatee Airport in Belize

Runways
Direction	Length		Surface
Direction	m	ft	Surface
09/27	1,240	4,068	Gravel
- Source: Landings.com Google Maps GCM

Manatee Airport (IATA: MZE, ICAO: MZSL) is a public use airport serving the rural community of Spanish Lookout, Cayo District, Belize.

The Belize VOR-DME (Ident: BZE) is located 43.5 nautical miles (81 km) east-northeast of the runway.

== See also ==
- Transport in Belize
- List of airports in Belize
