= Big Creek, Belize =

Big Creek
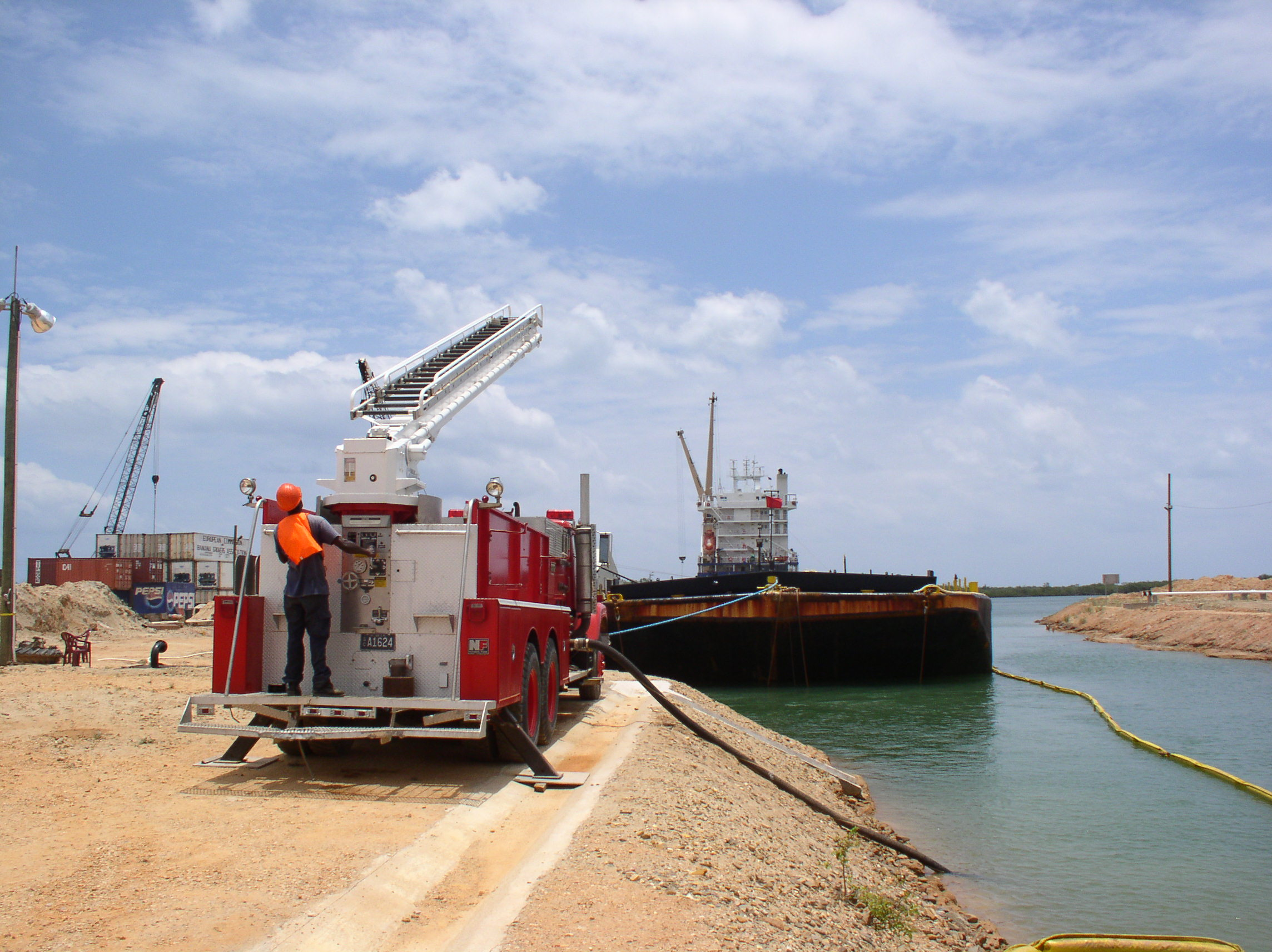
- Oil barge being loaded at Big Creek Port
- Interactive map of Big Creek
- Map of Big Creek location

Location
- Country: Belize
- Location: Toledo District
- Coordinates: 16°30′51″N 88°24′16″W
- UN/LOCODE: BZBGK

Details
- Opened: Yes
- No. of berths: 3
- Draft depth: 11.0 m. in the channel

Statistics
- Website www.portofbigcreek.com

Port of Big Creek is the only deep-water port facility on the in Country of Belize (just south of the boundary with Stann Creek District), constructed in the 1990s. It is the nation's largest private port., after Belize City. Big Creek is the main port for Belize's banana industry; citrus fruit and shrimp are also exported from here. It is also the location from which oil, extracted from the fields of Spanish Lookout, is exported.

== Facilities ==
The port is ISPS certified and has 3 berths. Cargoes handled include bananas, citrus fruit and petroleum.

== Hurricanes ==
The port is not a designated safe harbour with regard to hurricane preparedness.

Big Creek was the location in which the Peter Hughes dive boat "Wave Dancer" capsized during Hurricane Iris in October 2001, killing 20 persons, comprising 3 crew members and 17 vacationing divers from Richmond, Virginia.
