= No. 25 Flight AAC =

- Active: 1987–September 2015
- Country: United Kingdom
- Branch: (United Kingdom) Army Air Corps

25 Flight Army Air Corps is a former flight within the British Army's Army Air Corps.

== History ==
The flight was formed in 1987 in Belize where it operated Westland Sioux AH.1 helicopters. The flight returned to AAC Middle Wallop in August 2011. The flight supported UK peacetime operations and training including the security arrangements for the 2012 Summer Olympics which were held mostly in London but also at smaller locations throughout the UK. In March 2013 the flight deployed to Kenya where it supports the British Army Training Unit Kenya (BATUK). The flight's primary role is to provide 24/7 Medical Evacuation (MEDEVAC) cover to exercising troops training in the remote locations within Kenya as well as to BATUK dependents and permanent staff. The secondary role to provide range clearance prior to live firing. The flight had three Bell 212 helicopters. The Army Air Corps left Kenya in September 2015 after two and a half years of MEDEVAC support.

== See also ==
- List of Army Air Corps aircraft units
