= Chan Chen =

Settlement of Belize

Coordinates: 18.436°N 88.428°W

Chan Chen is a village located in Corozal District, Belize. Most of the inhabitants speak Spanish or Yucatec Maya, along with some English. The name Chan Chen is Yucatec Maya meaning "small well" in English. Most Chan Chen inhabitants are of Maya ancestry.

== Demographics ==
At the time of the 2010 census, Chan Chen had a population of 715. Of these, 96.1% were Mestizo, 1.4% East Indian, 0.7% Creole, 0.7% Mixed, 0.3% Mopan Maya, 0.1% Ketchi Maya, 0.1% Mennonite and 0.4% others.

In terms of languages spoken (multiple answers allowed), 99.2% spoke Spanish, 76.2% English, 13.8% Creole, 4.0% Yucatec Maya and 0.5% Mopan Maya; 0.3% could not speak.
