= Price Barracks =

Military installation

- Ladyville, Belize
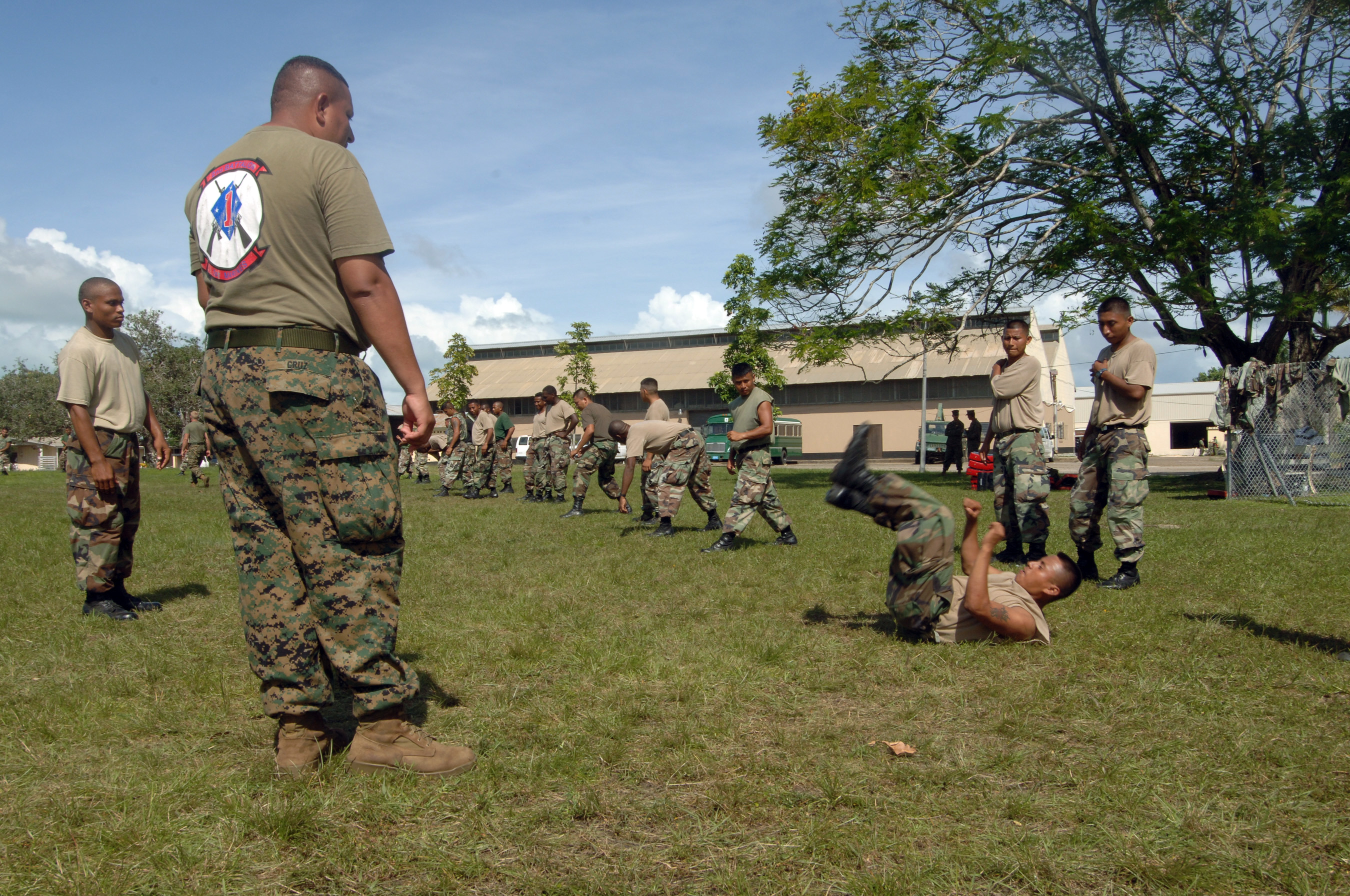
- Members of the Belize Defense Force are instructed on controlled falling techniques at Price Barracks

Site information
- Type: Barracks
- Owner: Government of Belize
- Operator: Belize Defence Force

Location
- Location in Belize
- Coordinates: 17.54482°N 88.30572°W

Site history
- Built: 1960s
- Built for: War Office
- In use: 1960s-Present

Garrison information
- Occupants: Belize Defence Force British Army

Price Barracks is a military installation located just north of Philip S. W. Goldson International Airport which is located in Ladyville some 8 miles to the north west of Belize City. It is the main base of the Belize Defence Force.

== History ==
The barracks has its origins in the British Honduras Garrison which had been established in British Honduras in the 1960s. In March 1972 the capacity of the garrison was doubled from facilities for 275 troops to 550 troops as a result of a threat from Guatemala. A significant deployment to the barracks, then known as Airport Camp, was undertaken by the Queen's Regiment in Spring 1976. Following the independence of the country as Belize in September 1981 the camp was renamed Price Barracks after George Cadle Price, a former Prime Minister of the country, and it became the main base of the Belize Defence Force.

In 1994, the UK Government established the British Army Training and Support Unit Belize (BATSUB) based within Price Barracks as its main international facility for jungle training. However, in 2010, it announced the closure of the facility as part of its Strategic Defence and Security Review. This decision was later reversed in 2015.
