= Orange Walk Airport =

Airport in Chan Pine Ridge, Belize

Orange Walk Airport Alfredo Martinez Chan Pine Ridge Airstrip
- IATA: ORZ; ICAO: MZTH

Summary
- Airport type: Public
- Serves: Orange Walk Town, Belize
- Location: Chan Pine Ridge
- Elevation AMSL: 111 ft / 34 m
- Coordinates: 18°02′48″N 88°35′00″W

Map
- Location of the airport in Belize

Runways
Direction	Length		Surface
Direction	m	ft	Surface
10/28	714	2,343	Asphalt
- Source: GCM Google Maps

Orange Walk Airport (now officially Alfredo Martinez Chan Pine Ridge Airstrip) (IATA: ORZ, ICAO: MZTH) is a public use airport 3 kilometres (2 mi) southwest of Orange Walk Town, Orange Walk District, Belize. The airport was also known as Tower Hill Airport.

The gravel airstrip was refurbished with asphalt in 2014.

The Chetumal VOR-DME (Ident: CTM) is located 31.2 nautical miles (58 km) north-northeast of the airport. The Belize VOR-DME (Ident: BZE) is located 34.1 nautical miles (63 km) south-southeast of the airport.

The original Orange Walk Airport was east of the town, but was closed sometime prior to 2001, and is now part of a highway bypass.

== Airlines and destinations ==
Airlines	Destinations
Tropic Air	Belize City–International

== See also ==
- Transport in Belize
- List of airports in Belize
