= Ladyville =

- Village
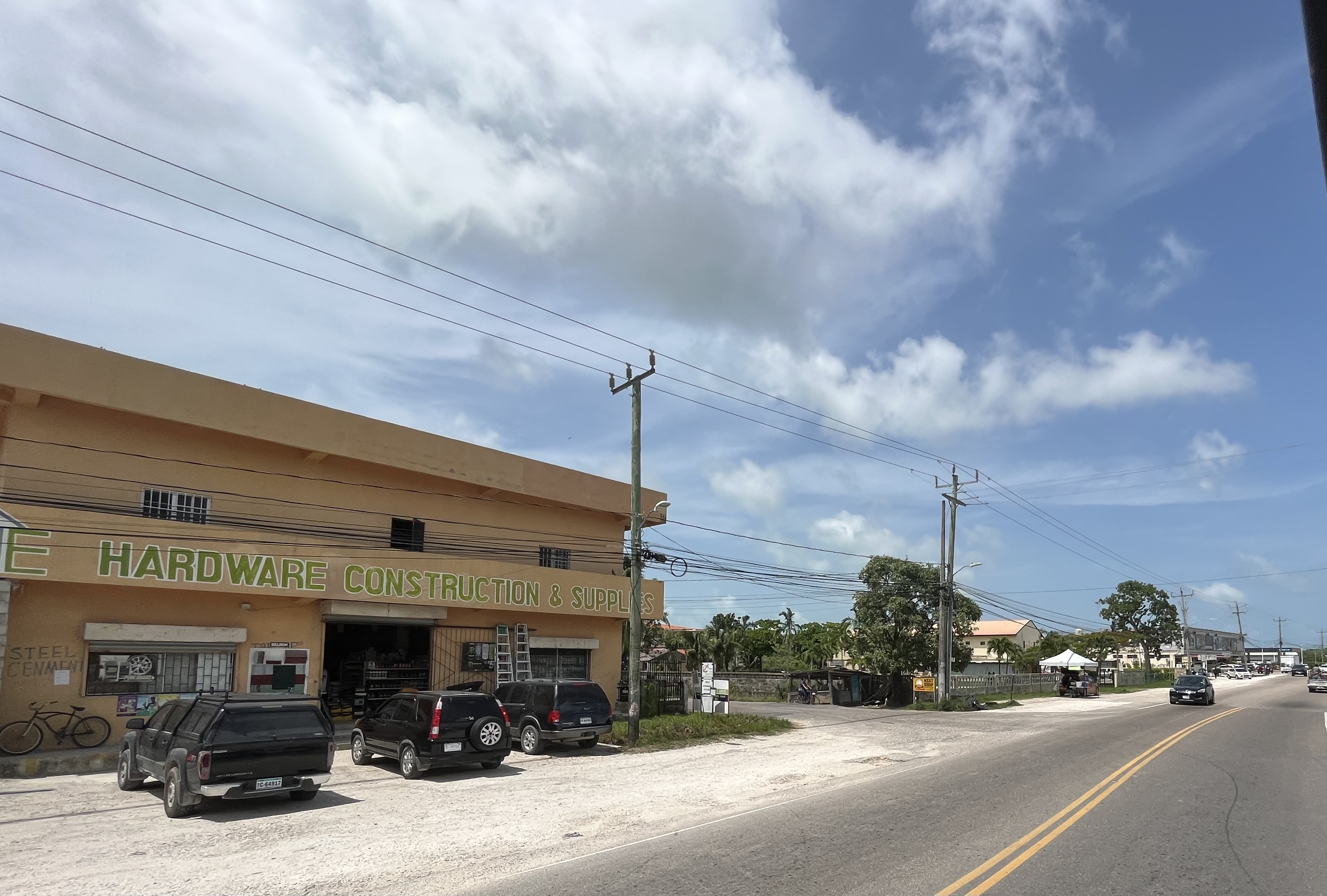
- View of the village

- Location in Belize
- Coordinates: 17°32′58″N 88°17′31″W
- Country: Belize
- District: Belize District
- Constituency: Belize Rural Central

Government
  - House of Representative Member: Beverly Castillo (UDP)
  - Village Council Chairperson: Dian Wite (UDP)
- Elevation: 16 ft (4.9 m)

Population (2010)
  - Total: 5,458
- Time zone: UTC+06:00 (CST)
- Area code: 225/205
- Climate: Am

Ladyville is the largest village in the country of Belize, eight miles northwest of Belize City in the Belize District. The Philip Goldson Highway connects Ladyville to Belize City.

== History ==
Although originally a separate settlement, Ladyville has become a suburb of Belize City, with many of its residents commuting to the city on a daily basis.

== Demographics ==
Ladyville recorded a population of 5,458 in the 2010 national census. The total number of households are 1,227 with an average size of 3.6 persons.

== Geography ==
Ladyville is located on the north bank of the Belize River and is approximately 5 miles inland from the Caribbean Sea. The terrain is part of the Belize's lowland and part of a natural flood plain. The land consists of broadleaf lowland forests and marshlands with creeks, ponds and mangrove forest along the coast. The Phillip Goldson highway cuts through the village. It has several neighbourhoods:

- Vista Del Mar
- New/Old Site
- "Mitchelle Estate"
- Perez Estate
- Japan
- Lake Gardens
- Bainton's Bank Area
- "Los Lagos Community"
- "Lord's Bank"

== Politics ==
National Government
Ladyville is part of the Belize Rural Central Constituency. Currently, the area representative for the Belize Rural Central Constituency, following the general elections on 5 November 2015, is Beverly Diane Castillo with 2560 votes who defeated incumbent representative Dolores Balderamos Garcia who had 2502 votes.

2015 National Election Summary Belize Rural Central 7513 5284 70.33% Beverly Diane Castillo UDP 2560 48.45% Dolores Balderamos Garcia PUP 2502 47.35% Javier Molina BPP 152 2.88% rejected 70 1.32%

Local Government
The Village Council is currently headed by Chairlady Dian Wite.
2016–2019 Village Council members

Village	Chairlady	Councillor	Councillor	Councillor	Councillor	Councillor	Councillor
Ladyville	Dian Wite	Audrey Moss	Taysha Choc	Calbert Wilford	Cindy Rowland	Adrian Mahler	Jermain Williams

- List of political parties in Belize

== Public utilities ==
The Belize Telemedia Limited - Ladyville Branch is located on the Old Airport Road.
The Belize Electricity Limited - Ladyville Branch, is located at 9 3/4mls Northern Highway.
The Belize Water Services Ltd - Ladyville branch is located at Lord's Bank road.
Butane Gas services are provided by Southern Choice Butane and Belize Western Energy Limited.

== Educational institutes ==
=== Primary schools ===
- Our Lady of The Way R.C. School
- Ladyville Evangelical School
- Seven Day Adventist Primary School.

=== High schools ===
- Ladyville Technical High School
- Tubal Trade Institute

== Medical ==
- St.Christopher's Clinic - Chemist/Pharmacy/General Practitioner
- Batsub/Price Barracks - Army Medics
- Ladyville Pharmacy - Chemist/Pharmacy
- Ladyville Seven Day Adventist Community Clinic

== Transportation ==
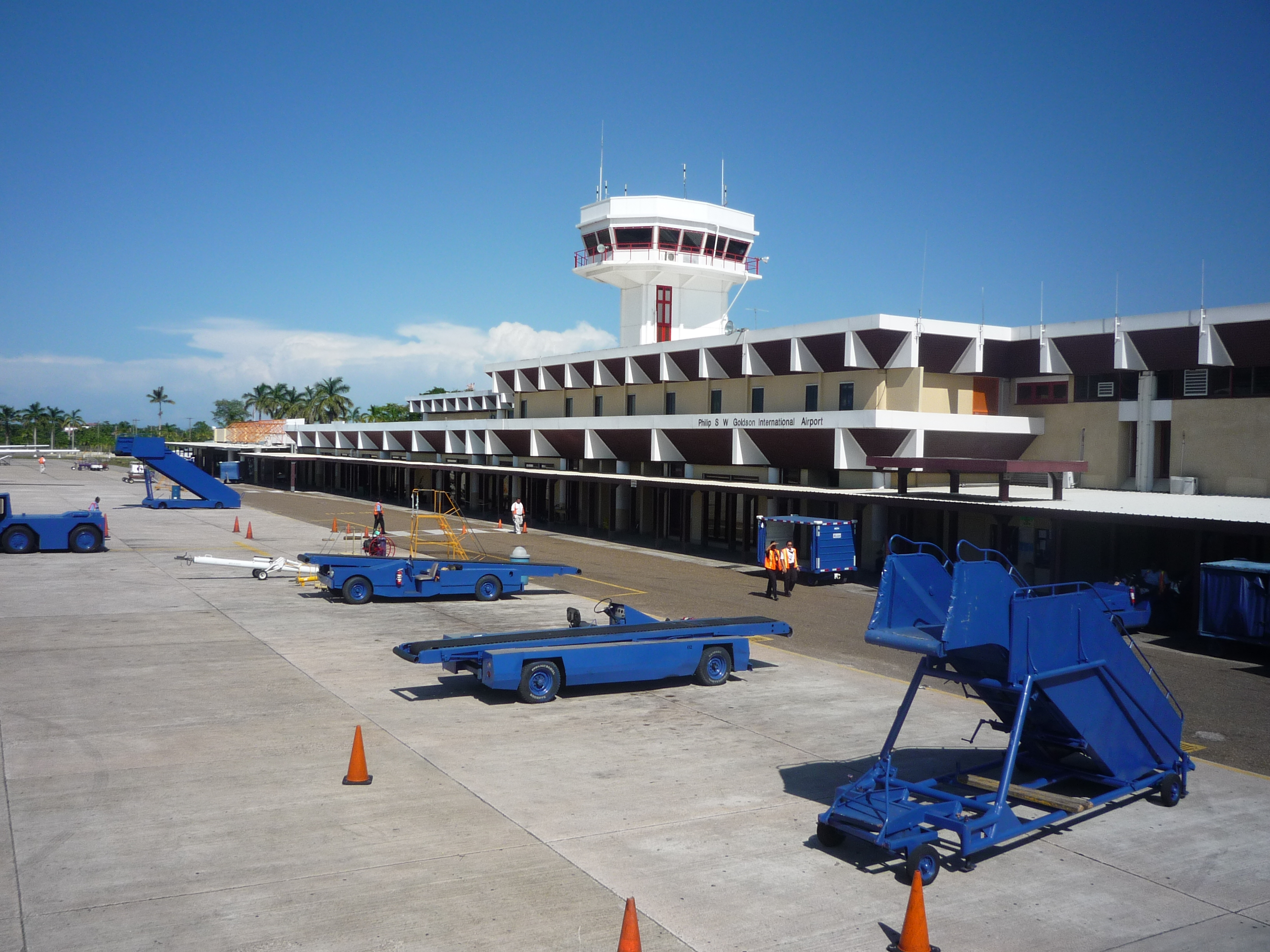
Philip Goldson International Airport, Belize

Philip S. W. Goldson International Airport, formerly known as The Belize International Airport (BZE), is located in Ladyville and is operated by the Belize Airport Concession Company Ltd. The airport serves Belize City and is the nation of Belize's main airport. It has a runway length of 7100 ft and is currently served by 9 airlines. Transportation from the airport to the Philip Goldson Highway is only available by the Ladyville Airport Taxi union. Public transportation for Ladyville is serviced by several different bus companies that operate both locally and nationally.

== Attractions ==
- Headquarters of the Belize Brewing Company, brewers of Belikin beer and Lighthouse lager.
- Coca-Cola bottling plant
- Belize Defense Force along with BATSUB (British Army Support Unit Belize) headquarters at Price Barracks.
- NAVCO National Association of Village Councils The Belize district office is located at the Ladyville Community Center on Poinsettia and Seagull Streets, Ladyville.
