= Los Angeles (disambiguation) =

Los Angeles is the most populous city in California and the second most populous in the United States.

Los Angeles may also refer to:

== Places ==
=== Chile ===
- Los Ángeles, Chile, the capital of the Chilean province of Bío Bío

=== Panama ===
- Los Ángeles, Chiriquí, a corregimiento (village)
- Los Ángeles, Los Santos, a corregimiento

=== Spain ===
- Cerro de los Ángeles, a hill
- Los Ángeles (Madrid), a neighborhood

=== United States ===
==== California ====
- Greater Los Angeles, the metropolitan area
- Los Angeles County, California
- Los Angeles Basin, the coastal plain
- Los Angeles River
- Los Angeles Street, downtown Los Angeles

==== Texas ====
- Los Angeles, Willacy County, Texas, a census-designated place
- Los Angeles, La Salle County, Texas, an unincorporated community

=== Elsewhere ===
- Los Ángeles, Catamarca, in Argentina
- Los Ángeles District, San Ramón, a district in the canton of San Ramón, Costa Rica
- Bahía de los Ángeles a bay located along the east side of the Baja California Peninsula of Mexico
- Los Ángeles, South Caribbean Coast Autonomous Region, in Nicaragua
- Los Angeles, Bohol, a barangay in the Philippines

== Music ==
- Los Ángeles (band), a Spanish pop group

=== Albums ===
- Los Angeles (Flying Lotus album), 2008
- Los Angeles (The Brilliant Green album), 2001
- Los Angeles (X album), 1980
- Los Ángeles (album), a 2017 album by Rosalía
- Los Angeles (Lol Tolhurst, Budgie, and Jacknife Lee album), 2023

=== Songs ===
- "Los Angeles", a 1968 song by Gene Clark from the 1998 U.K. album Flying High; also appears on the 2009 album Where the Action Is! Los Angeles Nuggets: 1965–1968
- "Los Angeles" (Frank Black song), released in 1993
- "Los Angeles", a song by Sugarcult from the 2006 album Lights Out
- "Los Angeles", a song by Blink-182 from the 2016 album California
- "Los Angeles", a song by X from the 1980 album Los Angeles
- "Los Angeles", a song by Counting Crows from the 2008 album Saturday Nights & Sunday Mornings
- "Los Angeles", a 2015 song by Amanda Grace
- "Los Ángeles", a 2023 song by Aitana

== Sports ==
- Los Angeles Angels, professional baseball team of Major League Baseball
- Los Angeles Chargers, professional American football team of the National Football League
- Los Angeles Clippers, professional basketball team of the National Basketball Association
- Los Angeles Dodgers, professional baseball team of Major League Baseball
- Los Angeles FC, professional soccer team of Major League Soccer
- Los Angeles Galaxy, commonly known as LA Galaxy, professional soccer team of Major League Soccer
- Los Angeles Kings, professional ice hockey team of the National Hockey League
- Los Angeles Lakers, professional basketball team of the National Basketball Association
- Los Angeles Rams, professional American football team of the National Football League
- Los Angeles Sparks, professional basketball team of the Women's National Basketball Association

== Transportation ==
- Los Angeles International Airport, the primary airport serving the Greater Los Angeles Area
- Los Angeles-class submarine, a boat class
- USS Los Angeles (ID-1470), a tanker in commission from 1917 to 1919
- USS Los Angeles (ZR-3), an airship in commission from 1924 to 1932
- USS Los Angeles (CA-135), a heavy cruiser in commission from 1945 to 1963
- USS Los Angeles (SSN-688), a submarine in commission from 1976 to 2010

== Other uses ==
- Los Angeles (magazine), a monthly magazine devoted to the city of Los Angeles

== See also ==
- City of Los Angeles (disambiguation)
- L.A. (disambiguation)
