= La =

LA most frequently refers to Los Angeles, the second most populous city in the United States of America.

La, LA, or L.A. may also refer to:

== Arts and entertainment ==
=== Music ===
- La (musical note), or A, the sixth note

==== Musical groups ====
- The La's, an English rock band
- Lady A, an American country music trio

==== Musicians ====
- L.A. Reid, a prominent music producer
- Yung L.A., a rapper
- La the Darkman (born 1979), stage name of American a musician and emcee Lason Jackson

==== Albums ====
- L.A. (EP), by Teddy Thompson
- L.A. (Light Album), a Beach Boys album
- La, a Les Gordon album

==== Songs ====
- "L.A.", a song by Elliott Smith on Figure 8 (album)
- "L.A." (Neil Young song), 1973
- "L.A." (Amy Macdonald song), 2007
- "LA" (Kelsea Ballerini song), 2020
- "La", a song by Australian-Israeli singer-songwriter Old Man River

=== Literature ===
- l(a, a poem by E. E. Cummings
- La (Tarzan), fictional queen of the lost city of Opar (Tarzan)
- Lá, later known as Lá Nua, an Irish language newspaper
- Liber Annuus, academic journal

=== Other media ===
- La7, an Italian television channel
- L.A. Screenings, a television market
- LucasArts, an American video game developer and publisher

== Politics and government ==
- Liberal Alliance (Denmark), a Danish liberal party
- Lebanese Army, the military of the Republic of Lebanon
- Local authority, a unit of government in the United Kingdom
- London Assembly
- Legislative assistant, a rôle on a legislator's staff

== Education ==
- Language arts, an educational subject
- Lawrence Academy at Groton, an American boarding school
- Lee Academy (Maine)
- Library Association, now called the Chartered Institute of Library and Information Professionals
- Loyola Academy, an American college preparatory high school

== Language ==
- Latin, by ISO 639-1 language code
- La (Javanese) (ꦭ), a syllabic in the Javanese abugidic script
- la, a form of the definite article in many Romance languages

== People ==
- La David Johnson (1992–2017), United States Army Sergeant
- LaBradford Smith (born 1969), American basketball player
- Lasse Andersson, (born 1994), Danish handballer

== Places ==
=== Europe ===
- Lower Austria (abbreviation: LA), a federal state in Austria
- Lancaster, a city in northwest England
  - LA postcode area, northwest England (area name derived from city of Lancaster)
- Landeck District, Austria (LA on vehicle license plates)
- Long Ashton, North Somerset, England

=== North America ===
- Latin America
- Los Alamos, New Mexico
- Los Altos (disambiguation), various places
- Louisiana, a state in the United States (postal abbreviation: LA)
- Lethbridge, Alberta, Canada
- Lower Alabama (South Alabama and Northwest Florida)
- Lewiston–Auburn, twin cities in the US state of Maine
- Lake Ann, Michigan

=== Elsewhere ===
- Los Ángeles (disambiguation), several places in Latin countries
- Laos (by ISO 3166-1 country code)
  - .la, its top-level domain
- La district, in Oudomxay Province, Laos
- Ladakh, a union territory of India (ISO 3166-2 code)
- Las Anod, a city in Khatumo and Somalia
- Latin America
- La, Ghana, a town in La Dade Kotopon Municipal District, Greater Accra Region

== Science, technology, and mathematics ==
=== Biology, biochemistry, and medicine ===
- La (genus), a genus of moths
- Lauric acid, a saturated fatty acid
- Lewis acids and bases, literature abbreviation
- Linoleic acid, a fatty acid
- Lipoic acid, an organosulfur compound
- Lupus anticoagulant, an autoimmune disorder
- Local anesthetic, in medicine
- Ludwig's angina, a type of bacterial infection that occurs in the floor of the mouth, under the tongue

=== Computing ===
- Load average, a measure of the amount of computational work that a computer system performs
- LoongArch, a RISC instruction set architecture
- Linux Australia

=== Other uses in science, technology, and mathematics ===
- Lanthanum, symbol La, a chemical element
- Laser ablation, a technique of removing material from a surface by irradiating it with a laser beam
- Linear algebra, a branch of mathematics

== Vessels of the United States Navy ==
- Los Angeles-class submarine, a boat class
- USS Los Angeles (ID-1470), a tanker in commission from 1917 to 1919
- USS Los Angeles (ZR-3), an airship in commission from 1924 to 1932
- USS Los Angeles (CA-135), a heavy cruiser in commission from 1945 to 1963
- USS Los Angeles (SSN-688), a submarine in commission from 1976 to 2010

== Other uses ==
- Landscape architecture, the design of outdoor structures
- LATAM Chile, formerly LAN Airlines (IATA code)
- Lavochkin, a Russian aerospace design bureau
- Lubuk Alung railway station, West Sumatra, Indonesia

== See also ==
- La La (disambiguation)
- Los Angeles (disambiguation)
