= Hurricane Keith =

Category 4 Atlantic hurricane in 2000

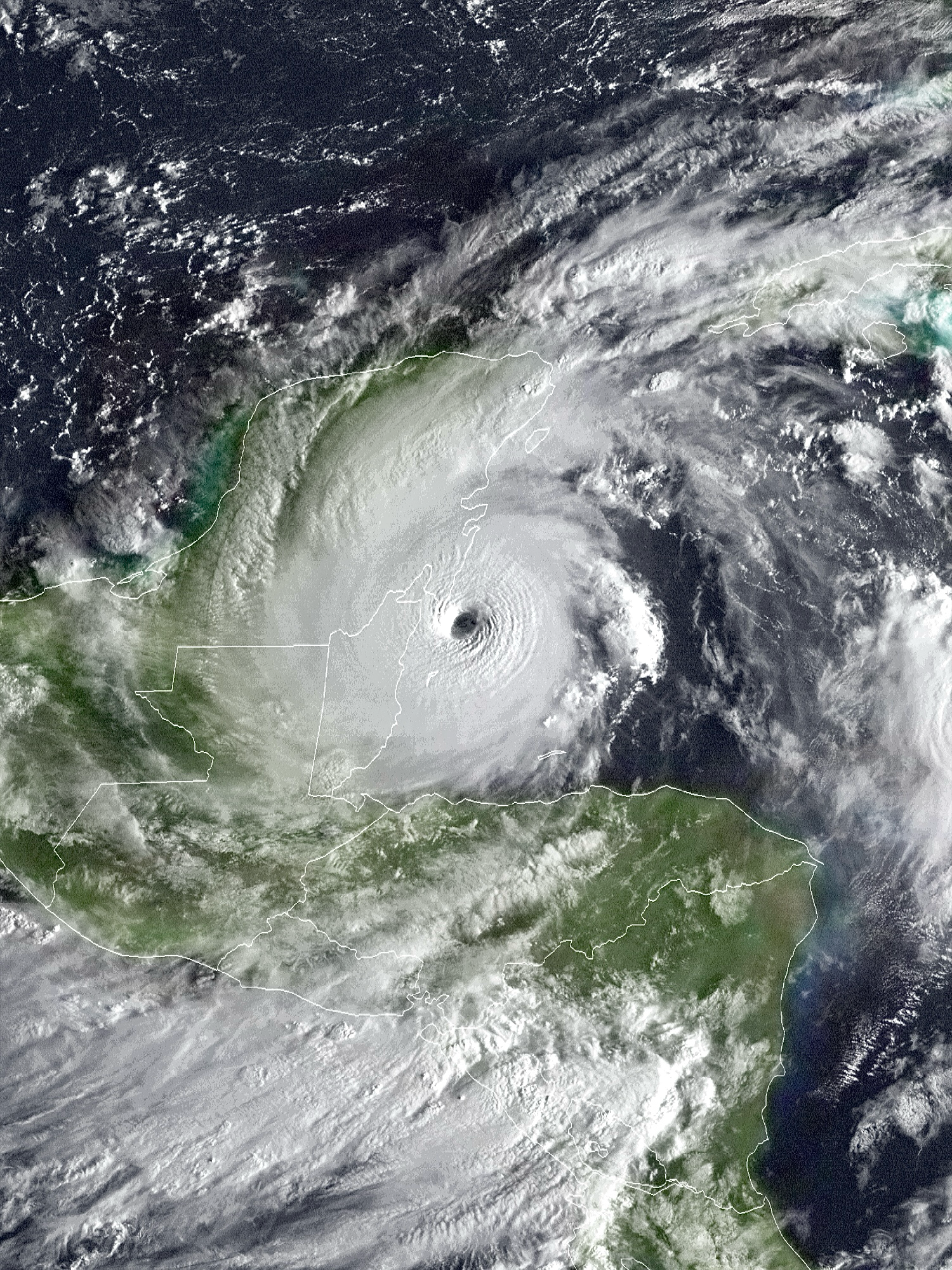
- Hurricane Keith at peak intensity nearing landfall on Belize on October 1

Meteorological history
- Formed: September 28, 2000
- Dissipated: October 6, 2000

Category 4 major hurricane
- 1-minute sustained (SSHWS/NWS)
- Highest winds: 140 mph (220 km/h)
- Lowest pressure: 939 mbar (hPa); 27.73 inHg

Overall effects
- Fatalities: 68 (62 direct, 6 indirect)
- Damage: $319 million (2000 USD)
- Areas affected: Central America, Yucatán Peninsula, Mexico, Belize
- IBTrACS
- Part of the 2000 Atlantic hurricane season

Hurricane Keith was a powerful tropical cyclone that formed in September 2000, it caused extensive damage in Central America, especially in Mexico and Belize. It was the fifteenth tropical cyclone, eleventh named storm, and seventh hurricane of the 2000 Atlantic hurricane season. Keith developed as a tropical depression from a tropical wave in the western Caribbean Sea on September 28. The depression gradually strengthened, and became Tropical Storm Keith on the following day. As the storm tracked westward, it continued to intensify and was upgraded to a hurricane on September 30. Shortly thereafter, Keith began to rapidly deepen, and peaked as a Category 4 hurricane less than 24 hours later. Keith then began to meander erratically offshore of Belize, which significantly weakened the storm due to land interaction. By late on October 2, Keith made landfall in Ambergris Caye and Caye Caulker, Belize as a minimal hurricane. It quickly weakened to a tropical storm, before another landfall occurred near Belize City early on the following day. While moving inland over the Yucatán Peninsula, Keith weakened further, and was downgraded to a tropical depression before emerging into the Gulf of Mexico on October 4. Once in the Gulf of Mexico, Keith began to re-strengthen and was upgraded to a tropical storm later that day, and a hurricane on the following day. By late on October 5, Keith made its third and final landfall near Tampico, Tamaulipas, Mexico as a moderately strong Category 1 hurricane. The storm quickly weakened inland and dissipated as a tropical cyclone by 24 hours after landfall.

Keith brought heavy rainfall to several countries in Central America, which resulted in extensive flooding, especially in Belize and Mexico. In Guatemala, the storm flooded 10 towns, and caused one fatality. Similarly, one fatality also occurred in El Salvador, and at least 300 people were affected by flooding in that country. Thirteen communities in Nicaragua were completely isolated after Keith made roads impassable. Twelve deaths were reported in Nicaragua, all of which were flood-related. Five people were presumed dead in Honduras after an aircraft disappeared near Roatán; one other fatality occurred due to flooding. The storm brought torrential rainfall to Belize, with many areas reporting at least 10 inches (250 mm) of rain, while highest reported amount of precipitation was greater than 30 inches (760 mm). In Belize, a village reported that only 12 houses remained, while elsewhere in the country, at least 60 homes were destroyed or damaged; several houses in Belize City suffered minor roof damage. At least 19 people were killed in Belize and damages totaled to $280 million (2000 USD). Heavy rainfall also occurred in Mexico, especially in the states of Nuevo León and Tamaulipas. Flooding from Keith caused several mudslides and a few rivers reached historic levels. Throughout Mexico, at least 460 houses were damaged or destroyed and other losses in infrastructure occurred. In addition, one person drowned due to heavy rainfall. Damages incurred in associated with Keith in Mexico totaled to approximately $365.9 million (2000 MXN, $38.7 million 2000 USD). Overall, Keith was responsible for 68 deaths and $319 million (2000 USD) in damage.

== Meteorological history ==
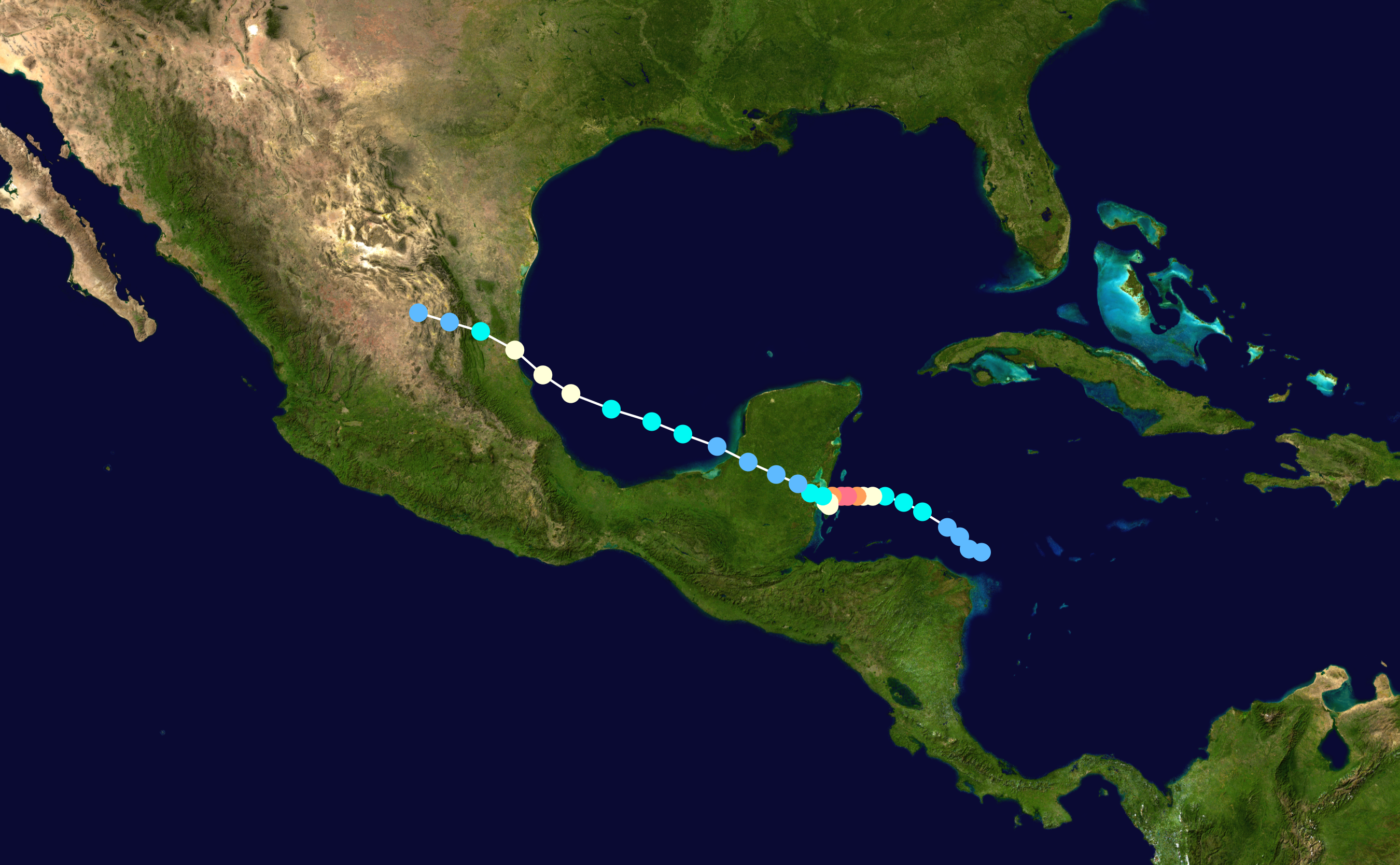
Map plotting the storm's track and intensity, according to the Saffir–Simpson scale Map key Saffir–Simpson scale Tropical depression (≤38 mph, ≤62 km/h) Tropical storm (39–73 mph, 63–118 km/h) Category 1 (74–95 mph, 119–153 km/h) Category 2 (96–110 mph, 154–177 km/h) Category 3 (111–129 mph, 178–208 km/h) Category 4 (130–156 mph, 209–251 km/h) Category 5 (≥157 mph, ≥252 km/h) Unknown Storm type Tropical cyclone Subtropical cyclone Extratropical cyclone, remnant low, tropical disturbance, or monsoon depression

On September 16, 2000, a tropical wave – an elongated area of low air pressure moving from east to west – exited the west coast of Africa. It moved westward across the Atlantic Ocean without development due to the presence of upper-level wind shear. After moving across the Caribbean Sea, a disturbance along the wave started to become better organized on September 27. The next day, a Hurricane Hunters flight indicated a closed circulation and winds of 37 mph (60 km/h); upon receiving the data, the National Hurricane Center (NHC) initiated advisories on Tropical Depression Fifteen at 2100 UTC. The NHC later estimated the depression had formed three hours earlier, about 70 mi (110 km) north-northeast of Cabo Gracias a Dios. Upon forming, the depression had good outflow, although the convection was not as organized. With an anticyclone over the system, the depression was expected to gradually intensify while moving slowly to the west-northwest, a motion caused by weak steering winds. Late on September 28, the NHC upgraded the depression to tropical storm status and named it Keith, after another Hurricane Hunters mission reported flight-level winds of 61 mph (98 km/h).

Hurricane Keith near landfall in Belize on October 1

By the time Keith became a tropical storm, it was beginning to undergo rapid deepening, fueled by warm waters, low wind shear, and an organizing cloud pattern. There initially was uncertainty in the storm's future movement, due to a ridge in the Gulf of Mexico. Tropical cyclone prediction models differed on their assessments; three models anticipated a turn to the northeast toward Florida due to a trough, while others predicted a continued slow motion to the west-northwest, eventually reaching the Bay of Campeche. After continued strengthening, Keith became a hurricane on September 30, just 18 hours after becoming a tropical storm, and making it the seventh such storm of that intensity of the season. That day, an eye began developing as the structure became much better organized. In a 13‑hour period beginning at 1808 UTC on September 30, Keith underwent explosive deepening, as its barometric pressure dropped at a rate of nearly 3 mbar (0.089 inHg) per hour. The NHC noted that Keith experienced conditions "ideal for strengthening", with the exception of the approaching land interaction with the Yucatán Peninsula. The hurricane slowed until stalling offshore eastern Belize, caused by the ridge to the north and the precursor to Tropical Storm Leslie forming over Cuba. By early on October 1, Keith had developed a well-defined eye about 20 mi (32 km) in diameter, with what the NHC described as a "spectacular appearance." Later that day, Hurricane Hunters estimated a minimum pressure of 939 mbar (27.7 inHg) and deployed a dropsonde that observed peak winds of 176 mph (283 km/h). Based on the data, the NHC estimated that Keith attained peak winds of 140 mph (220 km/h) at 0700 UTC on October 1, while just offshore eastern Belize. This made it a Category 4 on the Saffir-Simpson Hurricane Scale.

Shortly after Keith reached peak intensity, the eye had moved over portions of Belize, causing it to lose definition. Outflow became restricted, and the developing disturbance to the northeast increased wind shear. As a result, Keith began to weaken steadily on October 1. While remaining nearly stationary, Keith made a landfall on Ambergris Caye late on October 2 as a minimal hurricane. Shortly thereafter, Keith weakened into a tropical storm, and its convection became limited to the southeastern quadrant. At 0300 UTC, the storm made its second landfall about 29 mi (47 km) north of Belize City, and within nine hours weakened into a tropical depression. The building ridge to the north caused the system to accelerate more to the west-northwest across the Yucatán peninsula. Early on October 4, Keith emerged into the Bay of Campeche, where favorable conditions allowed convection to quickly redevelop. Later that day, it re-intensified into a tropical storm, with improved outflow and convective organization. On October 5, the Hurricane Hunters reported a circular eye had reformed along with winds supporting an upgrade to hurricane status. Keith intensified further that day, until it made its final landfall 23 mi (37 km) north of Tampico with winds of 90 mph (150 km/h). It rapidly weakened over the high terrain of northeastern Mexico, dissipating late on October 6.

== Preparations ==
On September 29, shortly after Keith formed, a hurricane watch was issued for the Yucatán Peninsula from Chetumal to Cabo Catoche in Quintana Roo. The next day as Keith was nearing hurricane intensity, the watch was upgraded to a warning, and a tropical storm warning and hurricane watch was issued for the Belize coastline from Belize City to the Mexican border. At that time, the trajectory was expected to go more to the northwest, and when the storm turned to a slow westward drift, hurricane warnings were issued for the Belize coast with only about 24 hours of lead time for the offshore islands. The warnings for the Yucatán peninsula were dropped as Keith weakened.

On October 2, the government of Belize declared a state of emergency and activated the entire Belize Defence Force due to the storm's threat. The airport in Belize City was closed during Keith's passage, limiting transportation from the country's mainland to its offshore islands. In Corozal, Belize, authorities evacuated the entire city of 10,000 people to numerous shelters in Orange Walk. Officials were also ordered evacuations for Belize City, setting up shelters in Belmopan. Overall, about 25,000 people evacuate, or about 10% of Belize's population. Three hospitals were evacuated in the country. In a post-storm assessment, residents on the offshore islands acknowledged they were unprepared for the storm and did not anticipate such intensity.

In Quintana Roo, 5,000 people from Chetumal and surrounding low-lying areas were forced to evacuate to 30 shelters. Offshore along a coral reef, about 50 fishermen stayed on a coral reef during the storm. In the Bay of Campeche, Pemex evacuated about 6,300 workers from its offshore oil platforms. Officials in Yucatán and Veracruz declared states of emergency. When Keith reached the Gulf of Mexico and began re-intensifying, a hurricane warning was issued from Tuxpan to Matamoros in northeastern Mexico, with a tropical storm watch issued northward to Port Mansfield, Texas. About 3,000 residents in Tamaulipas evacuated to 250 shelters, and in neighboring Veracruz, about 175 people left their houses before the storm struck. The threat of Hurricane Keith caused Mexican authorities to close most ports along the gulf coast, and many schools in the area were closed.

== Impact ==
Deaths by region
Region	Total deaths	Source
Belize	19	
El Salvador	1	
Nicaragua	12	
Honduras	6	
Guatemala	1	
Mexico	23	
Totals:	62	
Because of differing sources, totals may not match.

Keith's slow and erratic movement caused it to produce strong winds and heavy rainfall in Central America. Belize bore the brunt of the storm, with about $280 million in damage and 19 confirmed fatalities, primarily related to flooding. Several other countries reported significant but less severe flooding, including El Salvador, Guatemala, Honduras, Mexico, and Nicaragua. Overall, Keith was responsible for 40 deaths, as well as approximately $319 million in damage.

=== Belize ===
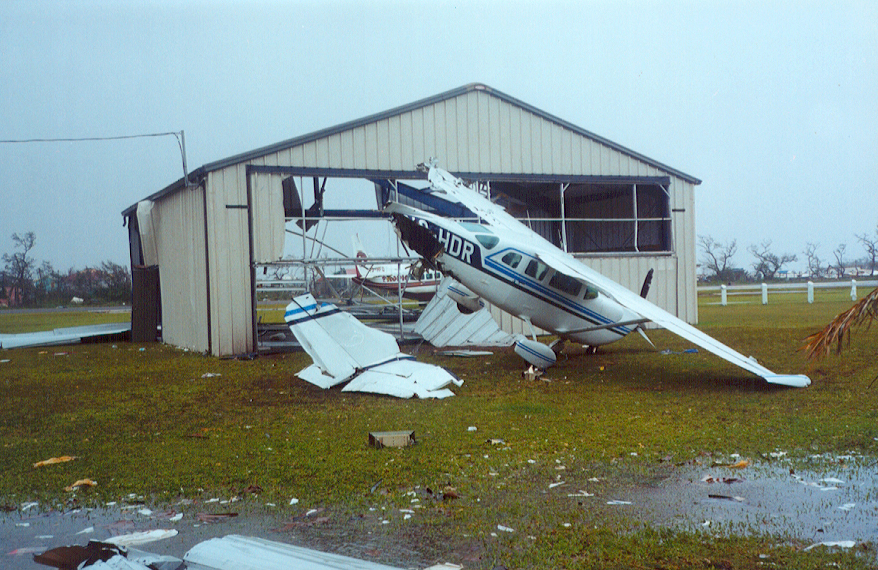
Destruction to an airplane hangar in Belize

While Keith was offshore from Belize, northerly winds blew water out of the Bay of Chetumal. There were reports of people walking onto the temporarily dry bay floor, despite the potential for the waters to return in the event of shifting winds. At Caye Caulker, the hurricane produced a 4 ft (1.2 m) storm surge from the west. Winds were unofficially estimated to have reached 125 mph (201 km/h) in the offshore islands of Belize. Wind gusts on the mainland reached 61 mph (98 km/h) at Philip S. W. Goldson International Airport. Due to its slow motion, Keith dropped heavy rainfall, amounting to over 10 in (250 mm) in many parts of the country. The highest recorded precipitation total was 32.67 inches (830 mm) at the international airport in Belize City.

The strong winds destroyed 130 houses in Belize. Two hotel roofs were wrecked, and the winds knocked down trees and power lines. Widespread areas of Belize lost power and telephone service, including Belize City. There, the heavy rainfall flooded streets, reaching 3 ft (0.91 m) deep. Twenty homes were damaged to some degree in the capital, while many more suffered minor roof damage. The rains flooded the first floor of the primary hospital in the city, causing severe damage. Nationwide, 11 health facilities were damaged. Elsewhere in the country, the rains increased levels along rivers, including the Belize River, Rio Hondo, and New River. The Belize River rose for several days after the storm, reaching record levels of 21 ft (6.6 m) in width, which isolated 15 villages. Flooding covered Northern Highway and Western Highway as well as the primary bridge from Belmopan to the rest of Cayo District. Residual floodwaters persisted due to the low-lying land of the country and poor drainage. Floods contaminated water supply in the northern four districts, causing an E. coli outbreak and food poisoning. In Belize, Corozal, and Orange Walk districts, about 30% of the houses were severely damaged by flooding.

Damage was heaviest in the northern offshore islands and in the northern portion of the mainland. On the offshore islands, downed trees and power lines blocked most roads. In Caye Caulker and San Pedro, Keith damaged the roofs of about 90% of houses and damaged or destroyed 676 houses, leaving 3,279 people homeless. About 50% of the houses in Caye Caulker were destroyed, In San Pedro, about 30% of houses, or at least 50, were wrecked. On Ambergris Caye, four airplanes were destroyed. At Turneffe Atoll, about 35% of the landmass was affected, with many trees in that section uprooted and numerous tree branches snapped.

Five individuals died in maritime accidents involving at least one catamaran. There was an accident involving a bus carrying evacuees, killing four people on board. Three people died on the offshore Ambergris Caye. Overall, 19 people perished in the country. Several injuries, mainly from flying debris, were reported in San Pedro, and there were 142 people who were injured in the storm. Throughout the country, approximately 3,279 homes were either damaged or destroyed. The damage total from Keith was initially estimated at $200 million, about half of which was to tourism facilities; the remainder was roughly split between crop and infrastructure damage. About 75% of the crops in the country were damaged, including much of the corn harvest that was expected to begin in October. The damage total was later estimated at $280 million, most of it on the offshore Ambergris Cay and Caye Caulker.

=== Mexico ===
Damage totals in Mexico in thousands of Mexican pesos, year 2000, unadjusted for inflation
State	Direct damage	Indirect damage	Total
Sonora	63,936	500	64,436
Nuevo León	115,600	0	115,600
Tamaulipas	117,167	0.683	117,850
Quintana Roo	39,716	2.767	42,483
Chiapas	25,569	0	25,569
Totals	$361,988	$3,950	$365,938

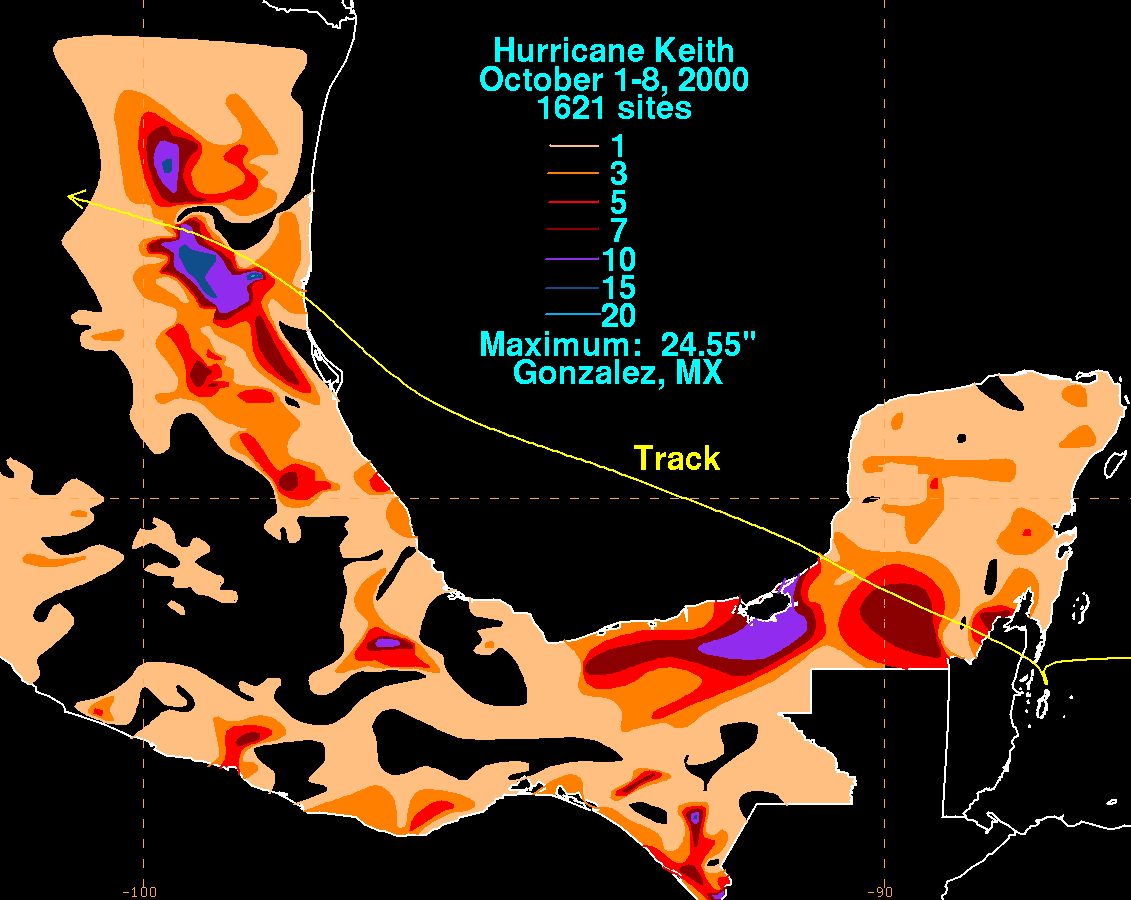
Keith rainfall across Mexico

Hurricane Keith caused damage in three Mexican states – Quintana Roo along the Yucatán Peninsula, Tamaulipas where the hurricane made landfall, and Sonora farther inland. In Quintana Roo, Keith left $2.7 million (2000 MXN, $294,000 2000 USD) in damage, and caused an additional $39.7 million (2000 MXN, $4.2 million 2000 USD) in indirect costs. While crossing the Yucatán Peninsula, Keith dropped heavy rainfall, including over 10 in (250 mm) in Campeche state. Chetumal, Quintana Roo reported 9.65 in (245 mm) of precipitation.

When Keith made its final landfall, Tampico reported tropical storm force winds, with gusts to 63 mph (101 km/h). The winds damaged billboards and some trees in the city, and elsewhere along the coast, Keith knocked down trees and power lines. About 200,000 people in northeastern Mexico lost power, and 100,000 people were left without water. About 400 houses were damaged in Veracruz, and many roads and bridges were destroyed. Heavy rainfall occurred in the interior of northeastern Mexico, peaking at 24.55 in (624 mm) in González, Tamaulipas. In a reporting station in the municipality of Gómez Farías, the pluviometer reported a 24-hour rain total of 13.24 inches (336 mm), and a storm total of 18.44 inches (468 mm), which broke the precipitation record for that location, which counted with 35 years of data. This rain also caused rivers to reach record levels, as the Sabinas River rose 10.95 m (35.9 ft) on October 6, to a new historical peak, and the Guayalejo River rose 77.46 ft (23.61 m), slightly under the 1976 record. This rainfall caused the Las Ánimas dam to catch 525,000 acre-feet (648,000,000 m^{3}) of water between October 5 and October 17; however, some of this water had to be released, as the upstream face of the dam was damaged by debris, and had to be repaired. Overall, the storm produced $117.8 million in damage (2000 MXN, $12.4 million 2000 USD) in the state.

In Nuevo León, the remnants of Keith interacted with a cold front to produce heavy rainfall, reaching 14.43 in (367 mm) in Sabinas. The average precipitation in the state was 5 inches (130 mm), and the deluge caused causing mudslides in several cities, including San Pedro, Guadalupe and Escobedo. High rainfall also caused flash flood in mountainous areas near Monterrey, forming swift river currents that rose up to 9,000 ft^{3}/s (250 m^{3}/s), and dragged 130 people into local rivers; however, all were rescued. The rivers also dragged 30 vehicles, all of which were moderate to total losses. The storm runoff caused the El Cuchillo dam to receive 105,000 acre-feet (130,000,000 m^{3}) of water daily, and the La Boca dam to receive 810 acre-feet (1,000,000 m^{3}) per hour. About 13,000 residents lost power. About 5,000 people were forced evacuated from several municipalities in the state, including 2,465 from Monterrey and 1,900 from rural areas, at a cost of $400,000 (2000 MXN). The total damages in the state rose to $115.6 million (2000 MXN, US$12.2 million in year 2000), with the damage to urban infrastructure being the most expensive portion of the damage, with $44.2 million (2000 MXN, US$4.6 million in 2000) used to repair damage in eight municipalities; in particular, San Pedro Garza García received approximately three quarters of the infrastructure damage, with $30.8 million (2000 MXN, $3.3 million 2000 USD). Additionally, about 460 homes were damaged or destroyed, and 300 families had to be relocated to safer areas.

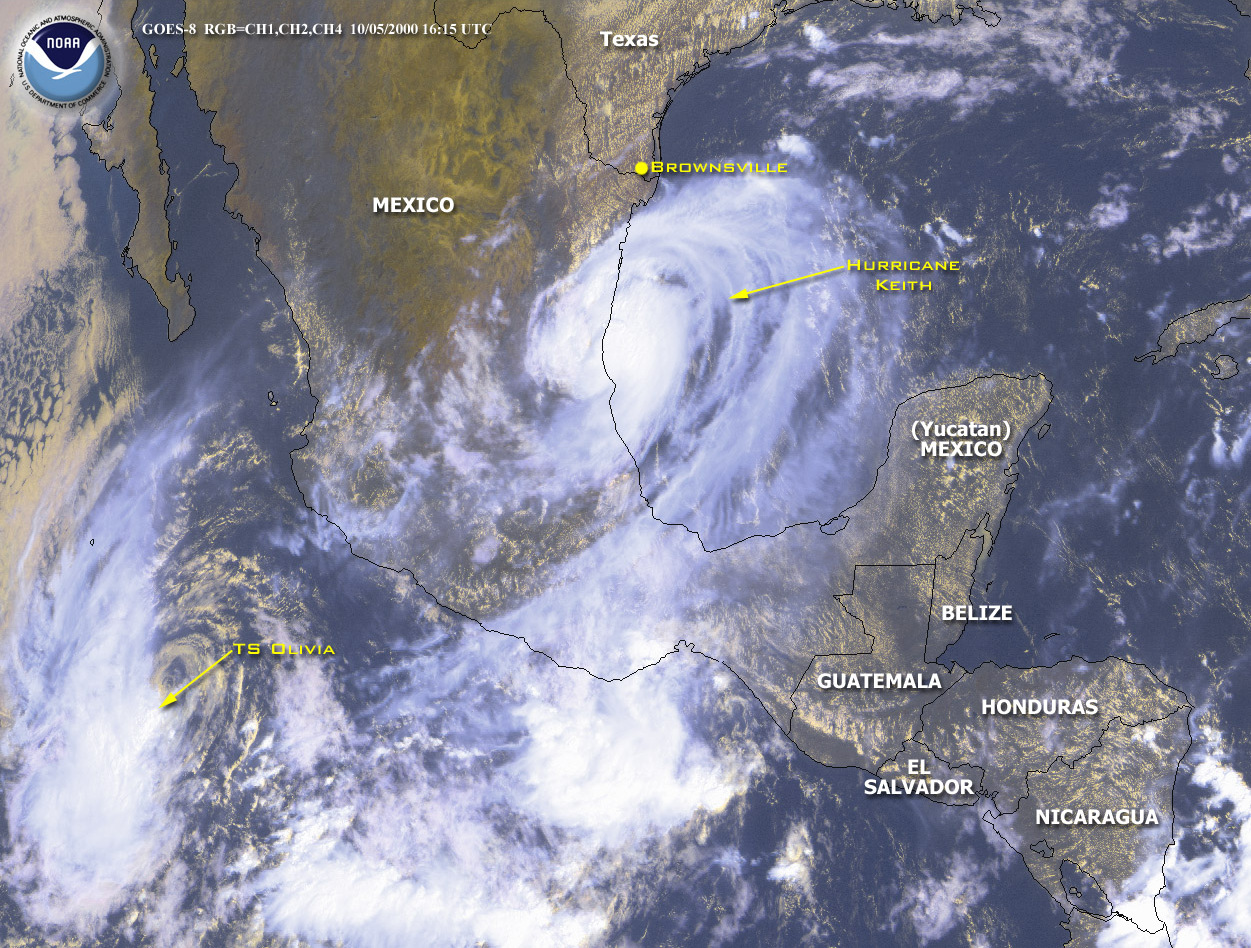
Hurricane Keith making its final landfall in Mexico with Tropical Storm Olivia in the Pacific on October 5

In other states, damage was lighter, but still significant. In Sonora, total damages rose to $64.4 million (2000 MXN, $6.8 million 2000 USD); in Chiapas, $25.6 million (2000 MXN, $2.7 million 2000 USD) of property damage were caused by the storm. This brings up the total damage in Mexico to $365.9 million (2000 MXN, $38.7 million 2000 USD). In Tabasco, flooding damaged 7,896 houses. Approximately 24,000 residents in the state were impacted by flooding. At the capital city of Villahermosa, large rivers in the area overflowed, flooding some streets. However, dikes and sandbags along the banks of the rivers prevented further flooding. Overall, about 46,000 people had to evacuate Mexico due to the storm and its flooding. There was one fatality when a man in Tampico was electrocuted by a downed power line. In Xicoténcatl, Tamaulipas, a swollen river killed a family of six when their house was flooded. Overall, Keith killed 23 people in Mexico – 13 in Veracruz, 4 in Puebla, and 6 in Tamaulipas. There were six indirect deaths when a plane crashed while attempting to land in Reynosa, Tamaulipas.

=== Elsewhere ===
The outer bands of Keith brought intermittent rainfall to several areas of Cuba, though the amounts were very light. While Keith was organizing, the storm drew moisture from the eastern Pacific Ocean across Central America, producing heavy rainfall. In Guatemala, the rains caused flooding in ten towns and inundated approximately 500 farms in the Melchor de Mencos municipality with about 4 inches (100 mm) of water. Additionally, one fatality was reported. Governor of Petén Department Adán Regalado remarked that, "many communities are cut off by flooded rivers". In El Salvador, a 20-year-old man drowned in a river, and 200 families had to evacuate after several houses were damaged or destroyed. Rainfall in Honduras forced over 200 families to evacuate their houses. One person died when a wall collapsed, and there were five other fatalities an aircraft disappeared near Roatan Island. A bridge along the Pan-American Highway between Honduras and Nicaragua was destroyed, which had been rebuilt following Hurricane Mitch. Additionally, a government agency reported that as many as 80,000 people in southern Honduras were left isolated.

In Nicaragua, floods from the storm forced 3,962 people to evacuate their houses to 57 shelters, many of which were schools. Floods affected 11 of the 17 Departments of Nicaragua, which began receding on October 5 as Keith exited the region. The floods caused several landslides and covered roads, which isolated communities. Keith damaged 436 houses in the country and destroyed another 160. There were 12 fatalities due to the storm in Nicaragua, one of whom a boy who was swept away by a fast moving flooded river northeast of Managua, while another death occurred after a man drowned in Lake Managua. A man in the western portions of the country died after stepping on a power lines, which had fallen due to strong winds. Fifty communities were isolated, with at least thirteen of them due to impassable roads. Several neighborhoods in Corinto flooded, forcing the Civil Defense to evacuate 9 families. One house collapsed in Los Ángeles, though its ten occupants escaped without injury. After rainfall lashed in Villanueva, Chinandega, for six days, the resultant flooding forced 300 families evacuated, while there was significant losses the corn, beans and plantains crops. An additional 20 families left their homes due to flooding in Poneloya. About 15 families in the port city of Puerto Sandino were evacuated after the El Contrabando river overflowed. Another 18 homes were flooded in the region of Salinas Grandes. About 52 fled Troilo after at least 11 homes flooded.

== Aftermath ==
On October 3, a Belize ambassador issued an appeal to the international community for food and money due to the damage from Keith. United Nations Development Programme received $30,000 from the Government of Norway to give immediate relief to the country of Belize. United Nations Children's Fund also gave out $150,000 for relief in areas not focused on by other relief groups. The Peace Corps, the Red Cross, and the United States Navy black hawk helicopters worked together to deliver rice, corn, sugar, salt, cooking oil, toilet paper, and medications to about 700 families in Bermuda Landings and adjacent isolated villages. The American Red Cross donated about $28,500 and 4,080 family hygiene kits. Between October and November 2000, the National Society distributed 5,289 food and hygiene parcels to 26,293 people in Belize City, Orange Walk, and Belmopan. Around that time, the Belize Red Cross Society (BRCS) distributed relief items to 4,622 victims in Belize City. The BRCS also shipped two containers with kitchen sets and water buckets for 1,600 families, donated by the German Red Cross. A donation account to help the relief effort, titled Hurricane Keith Relief Fund, was set up by the town of Placencia, in the local Atlantic Bank. The Belize Consulate in California also set up a donation fundraiser. Placencia also delivered a boat full of donated food, clothing, and building supplies to the San Pedro and Caye Caulker area.

In the immediate aftermath, officials enacted a curfew for Belize City, Caye Caulker and San Pedro to curtail looting, and the latter two areas were declared disaster areas. The entirety of the northern three districts (out of six total) were also declared disaster areas. There were initial difficulties in determining the needs in the affected residents, due to cut communications. The government sent planes with emergency supplies to the most affected offshore islands. Several emergency teams were sent to Caye Caulker and San Pedro as soon as weather conditions permitted it. Widespread road repairs also began almost immediately after Keith's occurrence. The Belize International Airport was back online by the morning of October 4, only a single day after the tropical cyclone passed through the area. By that time, boat service was re-instated with the most affected areas to pick up stranded tourists. Workers quickly restored power and water in Belize City. In the days after the storm struck, residual flooding sparked fears for the spread of disease. In Orange Walk and Cayo District, residents were advised to stay indoors to avoid bites from poisonous snakes.

In Nicaragua, the United States ambassador declared a disaster, which prompted various United Nations departments to provide $25,000 to the country.

Due to the hurricane's high impact, the name Keith was retired by the World Meteorological Organization in the spring of 2001 and it will never again be used for a North Atlantic tropical cyclone. The name was replaced with Kirk for the 2006 season.

== See also ==
- Weather of 2000
- Tropical cyclones in 2000
- List of Category 4 Atlantic hurricanes
- Hurricane Iris (2001) – another Category 4 hurricane that struck Belize just one year after Keith
- Hurricane Stan (2005) – a weaker hurricane that devastated similar areas
