= List of lighthouses in Belize =

This is a list of lighthouses in Belize. They are mostly located on the islands of the eastern Caribbean coastline of the country.

== Lighthouses ==
Name	Image	Location & coordinates	Admiralty number	Tower height	Range
Bugle Caye Light		Bugle Caye; 16.48790°N 88.32369°W	J5968	19 m (62 ft)	10 nmi (19 km)
East Snake Caye Light		East Snake Caye; 16.20849°N 88.50873°W	J5972	20 m (66 ft)	13 nmi (24 km)
English Caye Light		English Caye; 17.32721°N 88.04883°W	J5943.1	19 m (62 ft)	11 nmi (20 km)
Fort George (Baron Bliss)		Belize City; 17.49144°N 88.18147°W	J5954	15 m (49 ft)	8 nmi (15 km)
Half Moon Caye Light		Half Moon Caye; 17.20303°N 87.53559°W	J5936	24 m (79 ft)	14 nmi (26 km)
Hunting Caye Light		Hunting Caye; 16.10822°N 88.26829°W	J5974	17 m (56 ft)	13 nmi (24 km)
Mauger Caye Light		Turneffe Atoll; 17.60723°N 87.77242°W	J5940	19 m (62 ft)	13 nmi (24 km)
Sandbore Caye Light		Sandbore Caye; 17.46429°N 87.48822°W	J5934	25 m (82 ft)	17 nmi (31 km)

== See also ==
- Transport in Belize
- Lists of lighthouses and lightvessels
