= List of shipwrecks in November 1870 =

The list of shipwrecks in November 1870 includes ships sunk, foundered, grounded, or otherwise lost during November 1870.

== 1 November ==
List of shipwrecks: 1 November 1870
Ship	State	Description
Anna Wilhelmina	Prussia	Franco-Prussian War: The schooner, which had been captured by the French, was driven ashore west of Calais, France.
Antecello	Canada	The brig was abandoned in the Atlantic Ocean. Her crew were rescued by Horatio Harris (United States). Antecello foundered shortly after being abandoned. She was on a voyage from New York, United States to Colón, United States of Colombia.
Bedalia	Norway	The barque sprang a leak in the North Sea. She was on a voyage from a Norwegian port to London, United Kingdom. Her crew were taken off the next day by Aurora (United States). Bedalia was subsequently towed in to Cuxhaven in a waterlogged condition.
Dolores	United Kingdom	The ship was driven ashore at Lambay Point, Devon. She was on a voyage from Plymouth, Devon to Gijón, Spain.
Electra	Belgium	The ship ran aground on the Nieuwe Sand. She was on a voyage from Riga, Russia to Antwerp.
Garlick	United Kingdom	The paddle steamer suffered a boiler explosion and sank off the coast of Lancashire with the loss of all five crew. She was on a voyage from a Scottish port to Fleetwood, Lancashire.
Hendricka Boonstra	Hamburg	The ship departed from London for Hamburg. No further trace, presumed foundered with the loss of all hands.
Hermione	United Kingdom	The brig sprang a leak and foundered in the Atlantic Ocean off Boa Viagem, Brazil. Her crew survived. She was on a voyage from Glasgow, Renfrewshire to Montevideo, Uruguay.
Hero	United Kingdom	The ship ran aground on the East Knock Sand, in the North Sea off the coast of Essex. She was on a voyage from Newcastle upon Tyne, Northumberland to London.
Kate	United Kingdom	The ship was driven ashore at Winterton-on-Sea, Norfolk. She was on a voyage from Maldon, Essex to Goole, Yorkshire.
Lanoma	United Kingdom	The steamship ran aground and was wrecked on Scharhörn, Hamburg. Her crew were rescued. She was on a voyage from Sunderland, County Durham to Hamburg.
William and Emily	United Kingdom	The smack collided with the steamship City of Glasgow (United Kingdom) in the Dogger Bank and was abandoned. Her crew were rescued. She was towed in to Hull, Yorkshire by the smack Surprise (United Kingdom).
William and John	United Kingdom	The ship was wrecked at Ostend, West Flanders, Belgium with the loss of two of her crew. She was on a voyage from Sunderland, County Durham to Bruges, West Flanders.

== 2 November ==
List of shipwrecks: 2 November 1870
Ship	State	Description
Arica	Chile	The salvage barque foundered in the Pacific Ocean. Her crew were rescued. She was on a voyage from Tongot to Lota.
Lismore	United Kingdom	The steamship was struck a sunken wreck and was lost in the Whangpoo downstream of Woosung, China. Her crew were rescued.
Rival	(Dominion of Newfoundland) Newfoundland Colony	The schooner collided with HMS Niobe (Royal Navy) and sank off St. John's.

== 3 November ==
List of shipwrecks: 3 November 1870
Ship	State	Description
Earl of Derby	United Kingdom	The ship was driven ashore on the Dunball, off the coast of Somerset and was then run into by the schooner Pomona (United Kingdom) and was severely damaged at the stern. Earl of Derby was on a voyage from Bristol, Gloucestershire to Africa. She was taken back to Bristol for repairs.
Marlborough	United Kingdom	The ship was driven ashore in the River Thames at Blackwall, Middlesex. She was on a voyage from London to Hong Kong. She was refloated the next day and put back to London.
Unnamed	United Kingdom	The pilot boat was run down and sunk by the steamship Alice (United Kingdom) at South Shields, County Durham with the loss of a crew member.

== 4 November ==
List of shipwrecks: 4 November 1870
Ship	State	Description
Campeador	United Kingdom	The steamship ran aground on the Nore. She was refloated the next day with assistance from a tug.
Countess of Minto	United Kingdom	The ship ran aground at South Shields, County Durham. She was on a voyage from Quebec City, Canada to South Shields. She was refloated on 7 November and taken in to South Shields.
Frederick	United Kingdom	The barque was driven ashore near "Backoven". Her crew were rescued.
Mary-Ann	United Kingdom	The barque ran aground on the Cross Sand, in the North Sea off the coast of Norfolk. She was on a voyage from South Shields, County Durham to Martinique. She was refloated the next day and taken in to Great Yarmouth, Norfolk in a leaky condition.
Maori	United Kingdom	The ship was driven ashore and wrecked at Pillau, Prussia. Her crew were rescued. She was on a voyage from Fraserburgh, Aberdeenshire to Königsberg, Prussia. She was refloated on 11 November and towed in to Pillau.
No. 161	China	The lighter was driven ashore at Foo Chow Foo and was plundered by the local inhabitants.

== 5 November ==
List of shipwrecks: 5 November 1870
Ship	State	Description
Clarisse	United Kingdom	The ship was wrecked on the coast of Formosa in a typhoon. Her crew survived. She was on a voyage from Amoy, China to Takao, Formosa.
Estramadura	United Kingdom	The ship ran aground at Dragør, Denmark. She was on a voyage from Peterhead, Aberdeenshire to Danzig.
Otter	Canada	The barque was destroyed by fire in the Ottawa River.

== 6 November ==
List of shipwrecks: 6 November 1870
Ship	State	Description
Aberystwyth	United Kingdom	The steamship was driven ashore west of Bungshead, Wigtownshire. She was on a voyage from Glasgow, Renfrewshire to Wigtown. She was refloated and taken in to Port William, Wigtownshire.
Aurora	United Kingdom	The steamship collided with the steamship Kestrel (United Kingdom) and sank off Hellevoetsluis, Zeeland, Netherlands. Her crew survived. Laura was on a voyage from London to Bordeaux, Gironde, France.
Ethelwin	United Kingdom	The barque was destroyed by fire at Berdianski, Russia.
Export	Canada	The ship was abandoned in the Atlantic Ocean. Her crew were rescued by the steamship George Cromwell (United States). Export was on a voyage from Old Harbour, Jamaica to New York, United States.

== 7 November ==
List of shipwrecks: 7 November 1870
Ship	State	Description
Alnes	United Kingdom	The barque foundered in the Mediterranean Sea, according to a message in a bottle that washed up at Tynemouth, Northumberland on 15 April 1871.
Mary C. Curley	(Canada)	The ship was wrecked on a reef off Fishers Island, New York, United States. She was on a voyage from Little Glace Bay, Nova Scotia to New York City.
Valdivia	United Kingdom	The steamship ran aground in the Strait of Magellan. She was on a voyage from Liverpool, Lancashire, United Kingdom to Valparaíso, Chile. She was later refloated and completed her voyage.
Widgeon	United Kingdom	The steamship collided with the steamship Kestrel (United Kingdom) at Hellevoetsluis, Zeeland, Netherlands and was beached. She was refloated.

== 8 November ==
List of shipwrecks: 8 November 1870
Ship	State	Description
Africa	United Kingdom	The brig struck a rock and was wrecked at "Masua", Sardinia, Italy. Her crew were rescued.

== 9 November ==
List of shipwrecks: 9 November 1870
Ship	State	Description
Baltic	United Kingdom	The ship was driven ashore at Helsingborg, Sweden. She was on a voyage from Kronstadt, Russia to Grimsby, Lincolnshire.
Camilla	France	The ship was driven ashore at Vila do Conde, Portugal. She was on a voyage from Newcastle upon Tyne, Northumberland, United Kingdom to Porto, Portugal.
Lucie	Italy	The ship was driven ashore at Souter Point, Northumberland. She was on a voyage from Ipswich, Suffolk, United Kingdom to the River Tyne.
Peerless	United Kingdom	The ship foundered off Cape Horn, Chile. Her crew were rescued by the steamship Atacama (United Kingdom). Peerless was on a voyage from Newport, Monmouthshire to Callao, Peru.
Ternate	Netherlands	The ship departed from Batavia, Netherlands East Indies for a Dutch port. No further trace, presumed foundered with the loss of all hands.

== 10 November ==
List of shipwrecks: 10 November 1870
Ship	State	Description
Challenger	Victoria	The brig collided with the steamship Avoca (Victoria) and sank in Port Philip Bay.
Citadel	United Kingdom	The steamship was driven ashore and wrecked on Ronehamn, Sweden. She was on a voyage from Riga, Russia to Antwerp, Belgium.
Citadel	United Kingdom	The schooner was driven ashore on Skagen, Denmark. She was on a voyage from Newcastle upon Tyne, Northumberland to Danzig. She was refloated and resumed her voyage.
Energy	United Kingdom	The barque was driven ashore and wrecked at Dunkirk, Nord. She was on a voyage from Lowestoft, Suffolk to Antwerp. She was refloated on 21 November and taken in to Dunkirk.
Fortune-Teller	United Kingdom	The brigantine ran aground on the Marden Ledge, off The Needles, Isle of Wight. She was on a voyage from Runcorn, Cheshire to Newcastle upon Tyne, Northumberland. She was refloated.
Hebrides	Norway	The barque was driven ashore on Saltholm, Denmark. She was on a voyage from Gävle, Sweden to London, United Kingdom. She had been refloated and had resumed her voyage by 12 November.
Helen and Mary	United Kingdom	The schooner ran aground at Great Yarmouth, Norfolk. She was on a voyage from Lossiemouth, Moray to Great Yarmouth. She was refloated the next day and taken in to Great Yarmouth.
Jesusa	Spain	The brigantine foundered in the Atlantic Ocean 85 leagues (255 nautical miles (472 km)) off Bermuda. Her crew were rescued. She was on a voyage from Havana, Cuba to Falmouth, Cornwall, United Kingdom.
Oscar	United Kingdom	The steamship was driven ashore at Applecross, Inverness-shire. All on board were rescued. She was on a voyage from Stornoway, Isle of Lewis to Stromeferry, Inverness-shire.
Wingfield	United Kingdom	The barque ran aground on the Doom Bar. She was on a voyage from Rotterdam, South Holland, Netherlands to Newport, Monmouthshire.
Ystavet	Russia	The schooner was driven ashore at Great Yarmouth, Norfolk, United Kingdom. Her crew were rescued.

== 11 November ==
List of shipwrecks: 11 November 1870
Ship	State	Description
Beacon Light	Canada	The ship exploded in the Atlantic Ocean with the loss of two of her crew. She was on a voyage from the Clyde to Rangoon, Burma.
Burnano, or Burriana	United Kingdom	The steamship foundered in the North Sea 30 nautical miles (56 km) off Grimsby, Lincolnshire. Her crew were rescued by the steamship Hansa (Bremen), which lost three of her crew effecting the rescue. Burnano was on a voyage from Kronstadt, Russia to Leith, Lothian.
Four Brothers	United Kingdom	The schooner was driven onto the Burbo Bank, in Liverpool Bay. Her crew were rescued by the Point of Ayr Lifeboat. She was on a voyage from Fleetwood, Lancashire to Dublin. She subsequently came ashore at Prestatyn, Denbighshire. She broke up on 13 November.
La Plata	United Kingdom	The steamship was driven ashore at Cape Papas, Greece. She was refloated and sailed for Malta.
Ruby	United Kingdom	The tug ran aground on the Kilcock Rock, in the Irish Sea off the coast of County Wexford and sank. She was later refloated.
Santos	Portugal	The steamship ran aground on the Longsand, in the North Sea off the coast of Essex, United Kingdom. She was on a voyage from Hamburg to Lisbon. She was refloated with assistance and resumed her voyage.
Shepperton	United Kingdom	The steamship ran aground on the Hitterer Reef, in the Baltic Sea off the coast of Sweden. She was on a voyage from Kronstadt to London. She was later refloated and taken in to Copenhagen, Denmark.
Sir Charles Napier	Canada	The brig was driven ashore on East Sister Island, Ontario. She was on a voyage from Toledo, Ohio to Kingston, Ontario.

== 12 November ==
List of shipwrecks: 12 November 1870
Ship	State	Description
Aglae	United Kingdom	The ship was sighted in The Downs whilst on a voyage from "Chiltepec" to Newcastle upon Tyne, Northumberland. No further trace, presumed foundered with the loss of all hands.
Dunsandie	United Kingdom	The ship was abandoned in the English Channel. She was on a voyage from South Shields, County Durham to Barcelona, Spain. She was subsequently taken in to Calais, France.
Manin	Italy	The brig was wrecked on Peristera, Greece. She was on a voyage from Newcastle upon Tyne to Thessaloniki, Greece.
Victoria	Spain	The brig was wrecked on the Cay Sare Bank, in the Bahamas with the loss of eleven of her twelve crew.
Seven unnamed vessels	Flags unknown	The ships were wrecked on the Cay Sare Bank. Two or three of them were Spanish vessels.

== 13 November ==
List of shipwrecks: 13 November 1870
Ship	State	Description
Citadel	United Kingdom	The steamship was driven ashore and wrecked at Rønne, Denmark. She was on a voyage from Riga, Russia to Leith, Lothian.
Dorothea	Prussia	The ship was abandoned in the North Sea in a sinking condition. Her crew were rescued. She was on a voyage from Newcastle upon Tyne, Northumberland, United Kingdom to Brake.
Molly Bawn	United Kingdom	The ship was driven ashore at the mouth of the "Vojuzza". She was on a voyage from Trieste to Agrigento, Sicily, Italy.
Thomas and Elizabeth	United Kingdom	The brigantine was driven ashore near Ballyheigue, County Kerry. Her crew were rescued by the Coastguard. She was on a voyage from Limerick to Cardiff, Glamorgan.
Zaanstrom	Netherlands	The barque was driven ashore 1 nautical mile (1.9 km) west of Shoreham-by-Sea, Sussex, United Kingdom. She was on a voyage from Amsterdam, North Holland to Batavia, Netherlands East Indies. She was refloated the next day with assistance from the tug Pilot (United Kingdom) and sailed for Ramsgate, Kent, United Kingdom.

== 14 November ==
List of shipwrecks: 14 November 1870
Ship	State	Description
Active	Norway	The barque was wrecked on the Grote Vogelsand, in the North Sea. Her crew were rescued by SMS Habicht (Prussian Navy). Active was on a voyage from Hartlepool, County Durham, United Kingdom to Hamburg.
Carl	Flag unknown	The brig ran aground on the Witsand, in the North Sea. She was refloated and taken in to Cuxhaven in a leaky condition.
General Havelock	United Kingdom	The brig collided with the steamship Albert (United Kingdom) and foundered in the North Sea with the loss of a crew member. General Havelock was on a voyage from South Shields, County Durham to Rio de Janeiro, Brazil.
Glasgow	United Kingdom	The steamship was driven ashore at Portrush, County Antrim. She was on a voyage from Portrush to Westport, County Mayo. She was refloated and resumed her voyage.
Iona	United Kingdom	The ship barque was lost near Montevideo, Uruguay. Her crew were rescued.
Macedonian	United Kingdom	The brig ran aground on the Longsand, in the North Sea off the coast of Essex. She was on a voyage from Blyth, Northumberland to Lisbon, Portugal. She was refloated with the assistance of several smacks and taken in to Harwich, Essex in a severely leaky condition.
Margaret	United Kingdom	The brig sank at Westkapelle, West Flanders, Belgium. She was on a voyage from Great Yarmouth, Norfolk to Antwerp, Belgium.
Morning Star	United Kingdom	The ship was abandoned in the Atlantic Ocean 200 nautical miles (370 km) west of the Isles of Scilly. Her crew were rescued by Port Glasgow (United Kingdom). Morning Star was on a voyage from the Saint Lawrence River to Bristol, Gloucestershire.
Prince Rupert	United Kingdom	The barque sprang a leak and foundered 14 nautical miles (26 km) north west of Môle-Saint-Nicolas, Haiti. Her crew were rescued.
Proven	United Kingdom	The ship ran aground on the Hatteriff. She was on a voyage from Middlesbrough, Yorkshire to Horsens, Denmark.
T. A. Gibb	United Kingdom	The steamship ran aground on the Nore. She was later refloated.
Thomas	United Kingdom	The schooner was driven ashore at Fowey, Cornwall.
Two unnamed vessels	Flags unknown	A brig and a barque ran aground on the Blacktail Sand, in the Thames Estuary.

== 15 November ==
List of shipwrecks: 15 November 1870
Ship	State	Description
Danube	United Kingdom	The steamship was damaged by fire at Liverpool, Lancashire. She was on a voyage from Sicily, Italy to Liverpool.
Oernen	Norway	The ship was wrecked at Wyk auf Föhr, Prussia with the loss of thirteen of the 22 people on board. She was on a voyage from Hamburg to Valparaíso, Chile.
Tre Amici	Italy	The ship was driven ashore at Lampsacus, Greece. She was on a voyage from Taganrog, Russia to an English port.
Vermisseling	Netherlands	The ship ran aground off Baltrum, Prussia and was wrecked. Her crew were rescued. She was on a voyage from Riga, Russia to Schiedam, South Holland.
Virginia	United States	The ship sprang a leak and was abandoned 10 nautical miles (19 km) off the Turks Islands. She was on a voyage from Porto Plata to New York.
Unnamed	Flag unknown	The schooner ran aground on the West Hoyle Bank, in Liverpool Bay.

== 16 November ==
List of shipwrecks: 16 November 1870
Ship	State	Description
Apollo	United Kingdom	The schooner was wrecked in Budle Bay. Her crew were rescued.
Cheviot	United Kingdom	The steamship ran aground in the Danube at Gorgova, Ottoman Empire. She was refloated on 24 November and taken in to Sulina, Ottoman Empire.
Golden Grove	United Kingdom	The brig sprang a leak and foundered in the North Sea off Flamborough Head, Yorkshire. Her eight crew survived. She was on a voyage from Seaham, County Durham to London.
Hélène Catherine	France	The barque was wrecked on Süderoog, Prussia. She was on a voyage from Havre de Grâce, Seine-Inférieure to Hamburg.
Innes	United Kingdom	The schooner foundered 4.5 nautical miles (8.3 km) north north west of the Isle of May, Fife. Her crew survived. She was on a voyage from Helmsdale, Sutherland to Harburg.
Londonderry	United Kingdom	The tug was wrecked on Süderoog. Her crew were rescued. She was on a voyage from Hamburg to Hartlepool, County Durham.
Peri	(United Kingdom of Great Britain and Ireland) Jersey	The cutter heeled over at Jersey and filled as the tide rose. She was severely damaged but was subsequently placed under repair.
Seraing	Belgium	The steamship was wrecked near Björkösund, in the Gulf of Finland. She was on a voyage from Antwerp to Kronstadt, Russia.
Twin	United Kingdom	The fishing smack caught fire off the Smith's Knowl, in the North Sea off the north Norfolk coast and was abandoned by her crew.
Verwisseling	Netherlands	The ship was driven ashore on Baltrum, Prussia. Her crew were rescued. She was on a voyage from Riga, Russia to Schiedam, South Holland.

== 17 November ==
List of shipwrecks: 17 November 1870
Ship	State	Description
Gyda	Norway	The ship was driven ashore and sank at Noordwijk, South Holland, Netherlands. Her crew were rescued. She was on a voyage from Saint Petersburg, Russia to Rotterdam, South Holland.
Hawthorns	United Kingdom	The barque was driven ashore on the Shears. She was on a voyage from Liverpool, Lancashire to Philadelphia, Pennsylvania, United States. She was refloated on 19 November.
Helen Catherine	Flag unknown	The ship was wrecked on Föhr, Prussia.
Louis Mary	France	The ship was wrecked at Marseille, Bouches-du-Rhône. She was on a voyage from Laguna to Marseille. Also reported as Louis Marie, lost at Laguna.
Pyrrha	United Kingdom	The steamship was driven ashore on Hogland, Russia. She was on a voyage from Kronstadt, Russia to Leith, Lothian. She was later refloated and taken in to Reval, Russia.
Retreiver	United Kingdom	The ship ran aground on the Newcombe Sand, in the North Sea off the coast of Suffolk. She was on a voyage from Sunderland, County Durham to Lisbon, Portugal. She was refloated.
Telegram	United Kingdom	The smack was wrecked on Calve Island, Argyllshire. She was on a voyage from Glasgow, Renfrewshire to Stornoway, Isle of Lewis, Outer Hebrides.
William Chapman	United Kingdom	The brig was driven ashore and wrecked in Robin Hoods Bay. Her crew were rescued.

== 18 November ==
List of shipwrecks: 18 November 1870
Ship	State	Description
Dolphin	United Kingdom	The fishing smack collided with another fishing smack and was abandoned in the Irish Sea off the coast of County Wexford. She was subsequently taken in to Wexford by the Cahore Lifeboat.
Elizabeth	United Kingdom	The brig ran aground at Whitburn, County Durham. Her eight crew were rescued by the Whitburn Lifeboat. She was on a voyage from London to Newcastle upon Tyne, Northumberland. She was refloated and taken in to Sunderland, County Durham in a severely damaged condition.
Frank Churchill	Canada	The ship was driven ashore on Anticosti Island, Quebec. She was on a voyage from Málaga, Spain to Montreal, Quebec.
Freedom	United Kingdom	The ship ran aground on the Holme Sand, in the North Sea off the coast of Suffolk. She was on a voyage from Brixham, Devon to Newcastle upon Tyne. She was later refloated.
Hecla	Chile	The barque was wrecked at Punta Blanca, Bolivia. Her crew were rescued. She was on a voyage from Cobija to Tocopilla.
Heldewiga Regina	Netherlands	The sloop was wrecked on Heligoland. Her crew were rescued.
Nordstjernen	Norway	The sloop was wrecked on Heligoland. Her crew were rescued. She was on a voyage from Peterhead, Aberdeenshire, United Kingdom to Harburg.
Skulda	Norway	The barque was wrecked on Heligoland. Her crew were rescued. She was on a voyage from Málaga, Spain to Hamburg.

== 19 November ==
List of shipwrecks: 19 November 1870
Ship	State	Description
Benefactress	United States	The barque was driven ashore and wrecked at Somerset West, Cape Colony. Her crew were rescued. She was on a voyage from Yokohama, Japan to New York.
Cecilia	United Kingdom	The schooner was driven ashore and damaged at Harrington, Cumberland. Her crew were rescued. She was on a voyage from Dublin to Whitehaven, Cumberland.
Eliza and Jane	United Kingdom	The ship struck the Robin Rigg, in the Solway Firth and was consequently beached on the Mowbray Sandbank. Her crew survived. she was on a voyage from Silloth, Cumberland to Caernarfon.
Fame	United Kingdom	The ship was wrecked on Libby Island, Maine, United States with the loss of three of her crew. She was on a voyage from Waterford to Saint John, New Brunswick, Canada.
Haddock	United Kingdom	The ship was driven ashore near Wexford. Her crew were rescued.
M. E. Clarke	United Kingdom	The steamship was wrecked on the Haisborough Sands, in the North Sea off the coast of Norfolk. Her crew were rescued. She was on a voyage from Newcastle upon Tyne, Northumberland to London.
Nicholas Harvey	United Kingdom	The ship ran aground at Hayle, Cornwall. She was refloated.
Palestine	United Kingdom	The steamship ran aground in Bootle Bay. She was on a voyage from Venice, Italy to Liverpool, Lancashire.
Pero	Austria-Hungary	The barque struck a sunken wreck in the Farne Islands, Northumberland. She was beached at Spittal Point in a sinking condition. She was subsequently taken in to Berwick upon Tweed, Northumberland.
Sarah	United Kingdom	The schooner ran aground on the Annat Bank, off the mouth of the River Tay. Her five crew were rescued by the Montrose Lifeboat Mincing Lane ( Royal National Lifeboat Institution). She was on a voyage from Montrose, Forfarshire to Sunderland, County Durham.

== 20 November ==
List of shipwrecks: 20 November 1870
Ship	State	Description
Chilione	United Kingdom	The ship was driven ashore at Ballagon Point, County Antrim. She was on a voyage from Swansea, Glamorgan to Newry, County Antrim. She had been refloated by 23 November.

== 21 November ==
List of shipwrecks: 21 November 1870
Ship	State	Description
Auckland	New Zealand	The steamship ran aground at "Lava", Fiji.
Ann Fleming	United Kingdom	The schooner was driven ashore at Gardenstown, Aberdeenshire. She was on a voyage from Gardenstown to Hamburg. She was refloated and taken in to Banff, Aberdeenshire in a leaky condition.
Dawn	United Kingdom	The schooner ran aground at Arbroath, Forfarshire. She was on a voyage from Sunderland, County Durham to Arbroath. She was refloated and taken into Arbroath, where she struck the quayside and became leaky.
Empress	United Kingdom	The Thames barge collided with Cannon Street Railway Bridge, London and sank in the River Thames. Her crew were rescued.
Lois	United Kingdom	The barque ran aground at "Zebu". She was on a voyage from Hong Kong to "Zebu".
Mabel	United Kingdom	The brigantine ran aground on the Pennington Spit, Hampshire. She was on a voyage from London to Queenstown, County Cork. She was refloated.
Maid of Erin	United Kingdom	The schooner was driven ashore and wrecked on the Mull of Galloway, Wigtownshire. Her crew survived.
Marie Elizabeth	Prussia	The ship was driven ashore between Schwartzort and Memel.
Mary and Elizabeth	United Kingdom	The sloop was driven ashore at Boulmer, Northumberland.
Return	Canada	The ship was wrecked at Cape Jordan. Her crew were rescued. She was on a voyage from Yarmouth, Nova Scotia to Saint John, New Brunswick.
Skudesnes	(Russian Empire) Grand Duchy of Finland	The ship ran aground on the Corks Sand, in the North Sea off the coast of Essex, United Kingdom. She was on a voyage from Turku to London, United Kingdom. She was refloated and taken in to Harwich, Essex in a leaky condition.

== 22 November ==
List of shipwrecks: 22 November 1870
Ship	State	Description
Amelia	Canada	The schooner was wrecked at Richibucto, New Brunswick.
Annie Davies	United Kingdom	The smack was abandoned in Ramsey Sound. Her crew were rescued by the St. Davids Lifeboat.
Arica	United Kingdom	The schooner was driven ashore and wrecked near New Quay, Cardiganshire. Her crew were rescued. She was on a voyage from Waterford to Aberayron, Cardiganshire.
Charles Whiteway	United Kingdom	The schooner collided with the steamship Hartlepool (United Kingdom) and sank at Cuxhaven. Her crew were rescued by Hartlepool. Charles Whiteway was on a voyage from Hamburg to Runcorn, Cheshire.
Chester	United Kingdom	The Mersey Flat was abandoned in Ramsey Sound. Her crew were rescued by the St. Davids Lifeboat.
Duke of Northumberland	United Kingdom	The ship was driven ashore on Amrum, Prussia and sank. She was on a voyage from Rangoon, Prussia to Bremen. She was refloated in early December.
Eagle	United Kingdom	The schooner ran aground on the Corton Sand, in the North Sea off the coast of Suffolk. She was on a voyage from Rotterdam, South Holland, Netherlands to Liverpool, Lancashire. She was refloated and assisted in to Lowestoft, Suffolk by a tug.
Emily Agnes	United Kingdom	The ship was driven ashore at Cardiff, Glamorgan with the loss of three of her four crew. She was on a voyage from Cardiff to Dublin. She floated off and drifted into the Rhymney River in a waterlogged condition.
Hulda au Thorrissen	Hamburg	The schooner was driven ashore at Flamborough Head, Yorkshire, United Kingdom. She was on a voyage from Hamburg to "Barnsola".
Prima	United Kingdom	The smack abandoned in Ramsey Sound. Her crew were rescued by the St. Davids Lifeboat.

== 23 November ==
List of shipwrecks: 23 November 1870
Ship	State	Description
Arlington	United States	The steam lighter was destroyed by fire at Mobile, Alabama with the loss of twelve of the eighteen people on board.
Chatsworth	United Kingdom	The ship departed from Greenock, Renfrewshire for Pensacola, Florida, United States. No further trace, presumed foundered with the loss of all hands.
Clifton	United Kingdom	The barque was wrecked off "Bagsundet", Sweden. Her crew were rescued. She was on a voyage from Kronstadt, Russia to Wisbech, Cambridgeshire.
Fox	United Kingdom	The fishing smack was driven ashore and wrecked at Scalby, Yorkshire.
Gazelle	United Kingdom	The schooner was wrecked at the Corran Point Lighthouse, Inverness-shire. Her crew were rescued. She was on a voyage from Birkenhead, Cheshire to Tayport, Fife.
Henry Lawson	United Kingdom	The barque ran aground on the Dean Sand, in the English Channel. She was on a voyage from South Shields, County Durham to Cartagena, Spain. She was refloated and taken in to Portsmouth, Hampshire in a leaky condition.
Iris	Portugal	The barque was wrecked on São Miguel Island, Azores. All on board were rescued. She was on a voyage from Ceará, Brazil to Lisbon.
Jane and Mary	United Kingdom	The schooner was driven ashore at Penzance, Cornwall. Her crew were rescued. She was on a voyage from Penzance to a Welsh port.
Miss Hunt	United Kingdom	The ship ran aground on the Longsand, in the North Sea off the coast of Essex. She was on a voyage from Rotterdam, South Holland, Netherlands to Barrow-in-Furness, Lancashire. She was refloated.
Mount Royal	United Kingdom	The ship was damaged by fire at Bombay, India.
Neptune	United Kingdom	The sloop foundered off Portishead, Somerset with the loss of all hands. She was on a voyage from Newport, Monmouthshire to Bristol, Gloucestershire.
Samuel Russell	United States	The clipper was wrecked on Glass Island, in the Gaspar Strait. Her crew were rescued by Mogul (Flag unknown). Samuel Russell was on a voyage from Foo Chow Foo, China to New York.

== 24 November ==
List of shipwrecks: 24 November 1870
Ship	State	Description
Emma Ash	United Kingdom	The steamship ran aground on the Middle Sand, in the Humber. She was on a voyage from Kronstadt, Russia to Kingston upon Hull, Yorkshire. She was refloated with the assistance of some tugs and taken in to Hull.
George and Jane	United Kingdom	The brig was run down and sunk by the steamship Edina (United Kingdom) off the mouth of the Humber with the loss of five of her six crew. She was on a voyage from the River Tyne to London.
Regola	Italy	The brig sank at Falmouth, Cornwall, United Kingdom.
Victoria	United Kingdom	The tug was damaged in the River Tyne by a boiler explosion that killed a crew member.

== 25 November ==
List of shipwrecks: 25 November 1870
Ship	State	Description
Adrienne	France	The chasse-marée was driven ashore and wrecked at Dungeness, Kent, United Kingdom. Her crew were rescued. She was on a voyage from Courseulles-sur-Mer, Calvados to Blyth, Northumberland, United Kingdom.
Australia	United Kingdom	The ship was abandoned in the Atlantic Ocean (47°31′N 23°10′W). Her crew were rescued by Lady Elina Bruce (United Kingdom). She was on a voyage from Dalhousie, New Brunswick, Canada to Liverpool, Lancashire.
Belmont	United Kingdom	The ship ran aground at Fowey, Cornwall. She was on a voyage from Rangoon, Burma to Liverpool. She was refloated and resumed her voyage.
Bertha	United Kingdom	The steamship ran aground on the Nore. She was on a voyage from Glasgow, Renfrewshire to London. She was refloated and resumed her voyage.
Clara	Sweden	The schooner was taken in to Lowestoft, Suffolk, United Kingdom in a derelict condition.
Diamant	United Kingdom	The steamship ran aground on the Haisborough Sands, in the North Sea off the coast of Norfolk. She was refloated with the assistance of two smacks and a tug. She resumed her voyage.
Eaglescliffe	United Kingdom	The steamship ran aground at Berwick upon Tweed, Northumberland. She was on a voyage from Bo'ness, Lothian to Berwick upon Tweed.
Elizabeth	Hamburg	The ship ran aground on the Shipwash Sand, in the North Sea off the coast of Suffolk, United Kingdom. She was on a voyage from Iquique, Chile to Hamburg.
Friendship	United Kingdom	The ship foundered off the Longstone Lighthouse, Northumberland. Her crew were rescued. She was on a voyage from South Shields, County Durham to Fisherrow, Lothian.
George and Jane	United Kingdom	The brig collided with the steamship Edina (United Kingdom) and sank off the mouth of the Humber with the loss of all but one of her crew. She was on a voyage from Newcastle upon Tyne, Northumberland to London.
Magnet	United Kingdom	The full-rigged ship ran aground on the Pluckington Bank, in Liverpool Bay and capsized. All on board survived. She was on a voyage from Quebec City, Canada to Liverpool. She was refloated and towed in to Tranmere, Cheshire in a capsized condition.
Marie Delphine	Canada	The schooner was driven ashore at "Mount Louise". She was refloated and taken in to Gaspé, Quebec.
Quiver	United Kingdom	The fishing smack collided with the steamship North Star (United Kingdom) and sank in the Swin. Her crew were rescued.
Victoria	(United Kingdom of Great Britain and Ireland) Tasmania	The whaler was wrecked at Port Davey. Her crew were rescued.

== 26 November ==
List of shipwrecks: 26 November 1870
Ship	State	Description
Ibis	Norway	The brig capsized in the Atlantic Ocean. Her crew were rescued on 28 November by the schooner Cora (United Kingdom). Ibis was on a voyage from New York to Queenstown, County Cork, United Kingdom.
Mistress of the Seas	United Kingdom	The ship foundered in the Indian Ocean (11°16′S 19°00′E) <ERROR - Coords = inland> with the loss of eleven of her 25 crew. Eleven of the survivors were rescued by Kirkland (United Kingdom). Mistress of the Seas was on a voyage from Greenock, Renfrewshire to Calcutta, India.
Velocity	United Kingdom	The steamship collided with the steamship Leo (United Kingdom) and sank in the River Thames at North Woolwich, Middlesex with the loss of several lives. Velocity was on a voyage from Calais, France to London. She was refloated on 9 December and towed in to Deptford, Kent.
Wologda	Sweden	The ship was wrecked near Trelleborg. She was on a voyage from Saint Petersburg, Russia to Trelleborg.

== 27 November ==
List of shipwrecks: 27 November 1870
Ship	State	Description
Adret	Sweden	The brig was driven ashore and wrecked on Skagen, Denmark. She was on a voyage from Hull, Yorkshire, United Kingdom to Gothenburg.
Betsy Douglas	New Zealand	The schooner foundered off Charleston, New Zealand, probably after being holed on a rock.
Bokland	Denmark	The ship was driven ashore on Skagen.
Never Despair	(United Kingdom of Great Britain and Ireland) Antigua	The sloop was run down and sunk by the steamship Mersey (United Kingdom) with the loss of her captain. She was on a voyage from Saint Kitts to Martinique.
Primrose	United Kingdom	The ship sprang a leak and foundered 7 nautical miles (13 km) south of Aberystwyth, Cardiganshire. Her crew were rescued.
Queen	United Kingdom	The full-rigged ship was driven ashore 3 nautical miles (5.6 km) east of Calais, France. She was on a voyage from London to Dunkirk, Nord, France. She was refloated.
Salamanca	United Kingdom	The ship was sighted whilst on a voyage from London to Negapatam, India. No further trace, presumed foundered with the loss of all hands.
Towerab	France	The steamship was driven ashore at Vlissingen, Zeeland, Netherlands. She was on a voyage from Dunkirk to Antwerp, Belgium. She was refloated.

== 28 November ==
List of shipwrecks: 28 November 1870
Ship	State	Description
Edmond Alix	France	The ship was wrecked at L'Orient, Morbihan. She was on a voyage from Havre de Grâce, Seine-Inférieure to Buenos Aires, Argentina.
Eleanor	United Kingdom	The schooner was run into by the steamship Alredo el Grando (Spain) and sank off Dungeness, Kent. Her five crew were rescued by Alredo el Grando. Eleanor was on a voyage from Antwerp, Belgium to Annan, Dumfriesshire.
Hornet	United Kingdom	The brigantine struck a rock and foundered in the English Channel off Cap La Hougue, Seine-Inférieure, France. Her crew were rescued the next day by the barque Alma (Norway).
Job	Greece	The brig was driven ashore near Algeciras, Spain. She was on a voyage from Marseille, Bouches-du-Rhône, France to Falmouth, Cornwall or Queenstown, County Cork, United Kingdom.
Josephine Martin	United States	The ship ran aground at the mouth of the Weser. She was later refloated and take in to Bremen.
Lizzie	United Kingdom	The ship was driven ashore in Carskey Bay. Her crew were rescued. She was on a voyage from Troon, Ayrshire to Demerara, British Honduras. She was refloated in December and taken in to Belfast, County Antrim for repairs.
Triumph	(United Kingdom of Great Britain and Ireland) Admiralty	The Swiftsure-class battleship was severely damaged by fire whilst fitting out at South Shields, County Durham.

== 29 November ==
List of shipwrecks: 29 November 1870
Ship	State	Description
Bessie	United Kingdom	The brigantine was abandoned in the Atlantic Ocean 55 nautical miles (102 km) east south east of São Miguel Island, Azores. Her crew were rescued by City of Tanjore (United Kingdom). Bessie was on a voyage from Baltimore, Maryland, United States to Falmouth, Cornwall.
Blyth	United Kingdom	The steamship was driven ashore near Gorgova, Ottoman Empire.
Caroline	Flag unknown	The barque ran aground on the Ouse Edge Sand, in the Thames Estuary.
Coquimbo	Chile	The ship struck a rock near Colonia del Sacramento, Uruguay. She put into that port for repairs.
Diana	United Kingdom	The schooner was wrecked on the Down Rock, in Tana Bay. Her crew were rescued. She was on a voyage from Teignmouth, Devon to Glasgow, Renfrewshire.
Escosesa	Spain	The schooner was wrecked on the Longsand, in the North Sea off the coast of Essex, United Kingdom with the loss of one of her six crew. Survivors were rescued by New Unity (United Kingdom). Escosesa was on a voyage from Kristiansand, Norway to Bilbao.
Margaret	United Kingdom	The ship ran aground on the Mouse Sand, in the Thames Estuary.
Qui Vive	United Kingdom	The schooner was wrecked on The Skerries, off the coast of Anglesey. Her crew were rescued. She was on a voyage from Bangor, Caernarfonshire to Cork.
Spee	(United Kingdom of Great Britain and Ireland) Tasmania	The ship was wrecked on Preservation Island. Her crew were rescued. She was on a voyage from Lyttelton, New Zealand to Hobart.
Union	Bremen	The Norddeutscher Lloyd mail steamer, Bremen for New York, United States with 310 passengers, after repairing engine in heavy weather, stranded off Rattray Head, Aberdeenshire, United Kingdom. All passengers, 112 crew and mails were landed in boats. The ship later broke up.
Unnamed	United Kingdom	The coal hulk sank in the Belfast Lough.

== 30 November ==
List of shipwrecks: 30 November 1870
Ship	State	Description
Cincinnati	Italy	The full-rigged ship foundered in the Pacific Ocean (45°59′N 79°49′W). Her crew were rescued. She was on a voyage from Callao, Peru to Genoa.
Dekar, or Dodar	United Kingdom	The schooner collided with the steamship Oscar (United Kingdom) and sank in the River Thames. She was on a voyage from North Berwick, Lothian to London.
Lord Brougham	Hamburg	Franco-Prussian War: The ship, a prize, was driven ashore and wrecked at Dunkirk, Nord.
St. David	United Kingdom	The steamship ran aground in the Clyde. She was on a voyage from Greenock, Renfrewshire to the Suez Canal. She was refloated on 2 December.

== Unknown date ==
List of shipwrecks: Unknown date in November 1870
Ship	State	Description
Ada	Spain	The brigantine was driven ashore at Mariel, Cuba. She was on a voyage from London, United Kingdom to Havana, Cuba. She had been refloated by 25 November and completed her voyage on 30 November.
Adelheid	Flag unknown	The ship ran aground on the Vineta Reef.
Adina	Flag unknown	The ship was abandoned in the Atlantic Ocean before 15 November.
Adventure	United Kingdom	The ship ran aground on the Shipwash Sand, in the North Sea off the coast of Suffolk. She was refloated and assisted in to Harwich, Essex in a leaky condition.
Afrique	France	The lugger was driven ashore at Ibo. She was on a voyage from Marseille, Bouches-du-Rhône to Ibo. She was consequently condemned.
Albatros	United Kingdom	The yacht was wrecked on a reef in the Pacific Ocean before 9 November. She was on a voyage from the Fiji Islands to the Samoan Islands.
Anne Laurie	Canada	The schooner was abandoned in the Gulf of Saint Lawrence. All 52 people on board were rescued by Ariel ( Rostock).
Antonia	France	The barque was wrecked on the coast of Patagonia, Argentina before 15 November. Her crew survived.
Bessie Rogers	United States	The ship was driven ashore on "Windmill Island". She was on a voyage from Alicante, Spain to Philadelphia, Pennsylvania.
Betty	United Kingdom	The schooner was driven ashore at Trujill, British Honduras.
Blue Jacket	(United Kingdom of Great Britain and Ireland) Jersey	The ship was wrecked on a reef off "Japer Island in the Gaspar Strait and was abandoned by her crew. She was on a voyage from Kobe, Japan to a Dutch port. The wreck was plundered by the local inhabitants.
Blyth	United Kingdom	The steamship was driven ashore in the Danube.
Bon Pere	France	The ship foundered. She was on a voyage from Légué to Fécamp, Seine-Inférieure.
Bratzburg	Norway	The barque was driven ashore on Hiiumaa, Russia. She was on a voyage from Kronstadt, Russia to Liverpool, Lancashire, United Kingdom.
Broorene	Belgium	The ship ran aground in the Scheldt. She was on a voyage from Antwerp to Trieste. She was refloated and taken in to Vlissingen, Zeeland, Netherlands.
Camilla	United Kingdom	The ship was driven ashore at Calais, France. She was on a voyage from Gävle to Dunkirk, Nord, France.
Cerial	United Kingdom	The ship was driven ashore near Gallipoli, Ottoman Empire. She was refloated.
Choice and Dolphin	United Kingdom	The ship was driven ashore and wrecked.
Christine Marie	Denmark	The ship ran aground on the Andrews Sand, in the North Sea off the coast of Essex. She was on a voyage from Thisted to Ipswich, Suffolk. She was refloated.
Cornelia	United Kingdom	The ship was driven ashore at Leith, Lothian. She was on a voyage from Kronstadt, Russia to Leith. She was refloated.
Courier du Canada	(Canada)	The ship was driven ashore on the "Isle aux Cochons". She was on a voyage from Quebec City to Queenstown, County Cork.
Crinoline	United Kingdom	The ship put in to San Sebastián, Spain in a sinking condition. She was on a voyage from Liverpool to Santander, Spain.
Dan	Russia	The ship was abandoned in the North Sea off Ostend, West Flanders, Belgium. She was on a voyage from Riga to Antwerp.
Dolphin	United Kingdom	The steamship was driven ashore on Heligoland. She was on a voyage from Husum, Prussia to London. She was later refloated with the assistance of four smacks and taken in to Great Yarmouth, Norfolk, where she arrived on 28 November.
Don Quichote	France	The ship was wrecked on the coast of the Gulf of Mexico. Five of her crew were rescued by Charles F. Farwell (United States).
Dovercourt	United Kingdom	The ship ran aground on the Maricougan Shoal, in the Saint Lawrence River before 12 November. She was on a voyage from Amsterdam, North Holland to Montreal, Quebec, Canada.
Echo	United States	The ship was driven ashore at Barber's Point, in the Dardanelles. She was on a voyage from New York to Constantinople, Ottoman Empire. She was refloated with assistance.
Eclipse	United Kingdom	The ship ran aground on the Weymouth Reefs. She was on a voyage from Madeira to Antigua.
Ecosa	Spain	The schooner was wrecked on the Longsand, in the North Sea off the coast of Essex with the loss of a crew member. Survivors were rescued by the smack New Unity (United Kingdom. Ecosa was on a voyage from Kristiansand, Norway to Bilbao.
Edward Perry	United Kingdom	The ship ran aground on Diamond Island. She was on a voyage from Liverpool to Calcutta, India. She was refloated.
Egyptian	United Kingdom	The steamship put in to Malta on fire. She was on a voyage from Trieste and/or Alexandria, Egypt to a British port.
Eleanor	United Kingdom	The ship ran aground at Saint John's, Newfoundland Colony before 8 November. She was on a voyage from Liverpool to Saint John's. She was refloated with the assistance of a number of tugs and found to be leaky.
Elena	United States	The ship ran aground off Hittarp, Sweden. She was on a voyage from Philadelphia to Stettin. She was refloated and taken in to Helsingør, Denmark.
Elgin	United Kingdom	The ship was driven ashore at Cape Henlopen, North Carolina, United States. She was on a voyage from London to Philadelphia, Pennsylvania, United States.
Elizabeth	Netherlands	The schooner foundered in the Mediterranean Sea before 18 November. Her crew were rescued. She was on a voyage from Livorno, Italy to Bristol, Gloucestershire.
Elizabeth Ronneberg	Hamburg	The ship ran aground on the Shipwash Sand. She was on a voyage from Iquique, Peru to Hamburg. She was refloated and taken in to Harwich.
Emily	United Kingdom	The ship was driven ashore at Dingle, County Kerry. She was refloated.
Ericsen	Sweden	The ship was wrecked at Trelleborg.
Escape	United Kingdom	The full-rigged ship was wrecked on the coast of Formosa before 16 November.
European	United Kingdom	The schooner was driven ashore at Trujillo.
Evening Star	United Kingdom	The steamship was destroyed by fire at Montreal.
Expertus	Canada	The ship ran aground at Boston, Massachusetts, United States. She was on a voyage from Nova Scotia to Boston.
Felter	Prussia	The ship was driven ashore on Rügen. She was on a voyage from Königsberg to Stettin.
Fileur	France	The ship ran aground on the Pennington Spit, Hampshire, United Kingdom. She was on a voyage from Dieppe, Seine-Inférieure to Poole, Dorset, United Kingdom. She was refloated.
Germania	United Kingdom	The ship was driven ashore at Helsingør. She was on a voyage from Riga, Russia to Granton, Lothian. She was refloated on 10 November and taken in to Helsingør.
G. F. Vorwerk	Hamburg	Franco-Prussian War: The ship, a prize was driven ashore and wrecked in the Bangka Strait. She had been on a voyage from Hamburg to Shanghai, China.
Gibraltar	United Kingdom	The ship was driven ashore and wrecked on Mauger Caye, British Honduras. She was on a voyage from Belize City, British Honduras to London.
Gipsy Queen	United Kingdom	The steamship was driven ashore at Rock Ferry, Cheshire. She was on a voyage from Liverpool to Rock Ferry.
Grefore Berg	(Russian Empire) Grand Duchy of Finland	The steamship was driven ashore at Helsinki.
Hammonia	Hamburg	The steamship ran aground on the Kleine Vogelsand, in the North Sea. She was on a voyage from Hamburg to New York. She was refloated and taken in to Brunshausen in a leaky condition.
Heinrich	Netherlands	The schooner was run down and sunk by the barque Stromen (Norway) with the loss of three of the seven people on board. Heinrich was on a voyage from Saint Petersburg, Russia to Rotterdam, South Holland.
Helen Drummond	Canada Canada	The barque ran arground at Gaspé, Quebec. She was on a voyage from Montreal to Gaspé. She was later refloated and placed under repair.
Hispania	United Kingdom	The ship was driven ashore at "Nagara Point". She was on a voyage from Grimsby, Lincolnshire to Constantinople. She was refloated.
Ire Amici	Flag unknown	The ship was driven ashore near Gallipoli, Ottoman Empire. She was on a voyage from Taganrog, Russia to an English port.
Irene Inglesi	(Romania) United Principalities	The brig was wrecked off Cape Galata before 15 November.
Japan	United Kingdom	The ship foundered. She was on a voyage from Belize City, British Honduras to Havre de Grâce, Seine-Inférieure, France.
John Dryden	United Kingdom	The steamship was wrecked on a reef. She was on a voyage from Bombay, India to London.
Julia Parsons	United States	The schooner was abandoned at sea, while on her passage from Surinam. Crew saved.
Julie	United Kingdom	The ship was abandoned at sea. She was on a voyage from Newcastle upon Tyne, Northumberland to Norrköping, Sweden.
Lamona	United Kingdom	The steamship, a collier was wrecked at the mouth of the Elbe . Her crew survived. She was on a voyage from the River Tyne to Hamburg.
Laura	United Kingdom	The ship capsized. She was on a voyage from New York, United States to Queenstown, County Cork.
Limari	Chile	The steamship was lost with all hands before 17 November.
Lucretia	United Kingdom	The ship ran aground on the Cross Sand, in the North Sea off the coast of Norfolk. She was on a voyage from Falmouth, Cornwall to Great Yarmouth. She was refloated and assisted in to Great Yarmouth.
Magdala	United Kingdom	The steamship ran aground near Southport, Lancashire. She was on a voyage from Alexandria, Egypt to Liverpool. She was refloated and taken in to Liverpool.
Mail	United States	The ship was lost off Cabo Corrientes, Cuba.
Maria	Flag unknown	The ship was driven ashore neat Tönning, Prussia. She was on a voyage from "Wollersum" to the Elbe.
M. E.	United Kingdom	The ship was lost whilst on a voyage from Havana to Falmouth.
Minnie Kniepe	Prussia	The ship was driven ashore on Dragør. She was on a voyage from Liverpool to Königsberg. She was refloated.
North American	United Kingdom	The steamship was driven ashore on Flat Island, Newfoundland Colony. She was on a voyage from Montreal to Liverpool.
Odessa	United Kingdom	The steamship ran aground at "Halgriever". She was on a voyage from London to Calcutta. She was refloated.
Ore Sostre	Flag unknown	The ship was wrecked on the north coast of France. She was on a voyage from "Marlebury" to Morlaix, Finistère, France.
Patriarca	Spain	The ship was wrecked on the Pickles Reef. She was on a voyage from Havana to Barcelona.
Persia	United Kingdom	The ship ran aground on the Frying Pan Shoals and was severely damaged. Her crew were taken off on 30 November. She was on a voyage from New Orleans, Louisiana, United States to Liverpool.
Queen Esther	United Kingdom	The schooner foundered before 10 November. Her crew were rescued by Tranquille (France). Queen Esther was on a voyage from Taganrog and/or Taragona, Spain to Bristol.
Regina	United Kingdom	The ship was abandoned at sea. She was on a voyage from Arkhangelsk, Russia to a British port.
Retreiver	United Kingdom	The ship ran aground off Kessingland, Suffolk. She was on a voyage from Sunderland, County Durham to Lisbon, Portugal.
Return	Canada Canada	The ship was lost at Yarmouth, Nova Scotia. She was on a voyage from Yarmouth to Saint John's, Newfoundland Colony.
Rival	United Kingdom	The ship was driven ashore at Arkhangelsk. She was refloated.
Rockby	United Kingdom	The ship foundered in the South China Sea.
Rockcliff	United Kingdom	The barque foundered in the South China Sea. Her crew were rescued.
Rowe	United Kingdom	The ship was abandoned off the Isles of Scilly in a waterlogged condition. She was on a voyage from Quebec City to Cardiff, Glamorgan.
Royal Victoria	United Kingdom	The ship was driven ashore on Anholt, Denmark. She was on a voyage from Vyborg, Grand Duchy of Finland to an English port. She was refloated on 25 November with assistance and taken in to Helsingør in a waterlogged condition.
Sea Gull	United Kingdom	The ship was driven ashore and wrecked at Dunmore East, County Waterford.
Septentrio	Flag unknown	The ship ran aground in the Dardanelles. She was refloated.
Sicilia	Italy	The brig was driven ashore and severely damaged at Matanzas, Cuba.
Somrah Abeille	France	The ship was driven ashore at Vlissingen. She was on a voyage from Dunkirk to Antwerp.
Sophia	United States	The ship was wrecked at Morant Bay, Jamaica. She was on a voyage from Rio de Janeiro, Brazil to New Orleans, Louisiana.
Souchay	Flag unknown	The steamship ran aground at Galaţi, Ottoman Empire. She was refloated on 16 November.
St. Louis	United Kingdom	The ship ran aground on the Memory Rock. She was on a voyage from New Orleans, Louisiana to an English port. She was refloated and resumed her voyage.
Straven	United Kingdom	The ship was driven ashore "in the Traverse". She was on a voyage from Montreal to Buenos Aires, Argentina.
Silvia	United Kingdom	The ship foundered in the English Channel off the Channel Islands. She was on a voyage from Liverpool to Bombay.
Tobiah Cring	United Kingdom	The ship was wrecked in Shedabucto Bay.
Trafik	Russia	The steamship was lost at Novaya Zemlya.
Trent	United Kingdom	The ship was abandoned in Algoa Bay.
Uncowah	Italy	The clipper was destroyed by fire off "Neptune Island" with the loss of 425 lives. She was on a voyage from Macao, China to Callao, Peru. The fire had been started by some of the 537 coolies on board. Her crew and 112 coolies were rescued the full-rigged ships San Salvadore and Suanpore (Flags unknown).
Union	Norway	The ship ran aground off Vadsø. She was on a voyage from Vadsø to an Italian port.
Veritas	United Kingdom	The ship was driven ashore in Clevedon Bay. She was on a voyage from Cardiff to Genoa, Italy.
Vobeka, or Wopken	Russia	The ship sprang a leak and foundered in the Baltic Sea off Cape Arkona, Prussia. Her crew were rescued. She was on a voyage from Saint Petersburg to Copenhagen, Denmark.
Wafik	Russia	The steamship was lost near Novaya Zemlya.
William Hunter	United Kingdom	The ship ran aground at Hamburg. She was on a voyage from South Shields, County Durham to Hamburg.
Winifred	United States	The ship ran aground on the Doom Bar. She was on a voyage from Rotterdam to Newport, Monmouthshire, United Kingdom.
Wyoming	United States	The ship ran aground on the Pea Patch. She was on a voyage from Liverpool to Philadelphia. She was later refloated and completed her voyage.
Zarco	Italy	The steamship was driven ashore and sank at Catanzaro.
