= English Caye Light =

Lighthouse in Belize

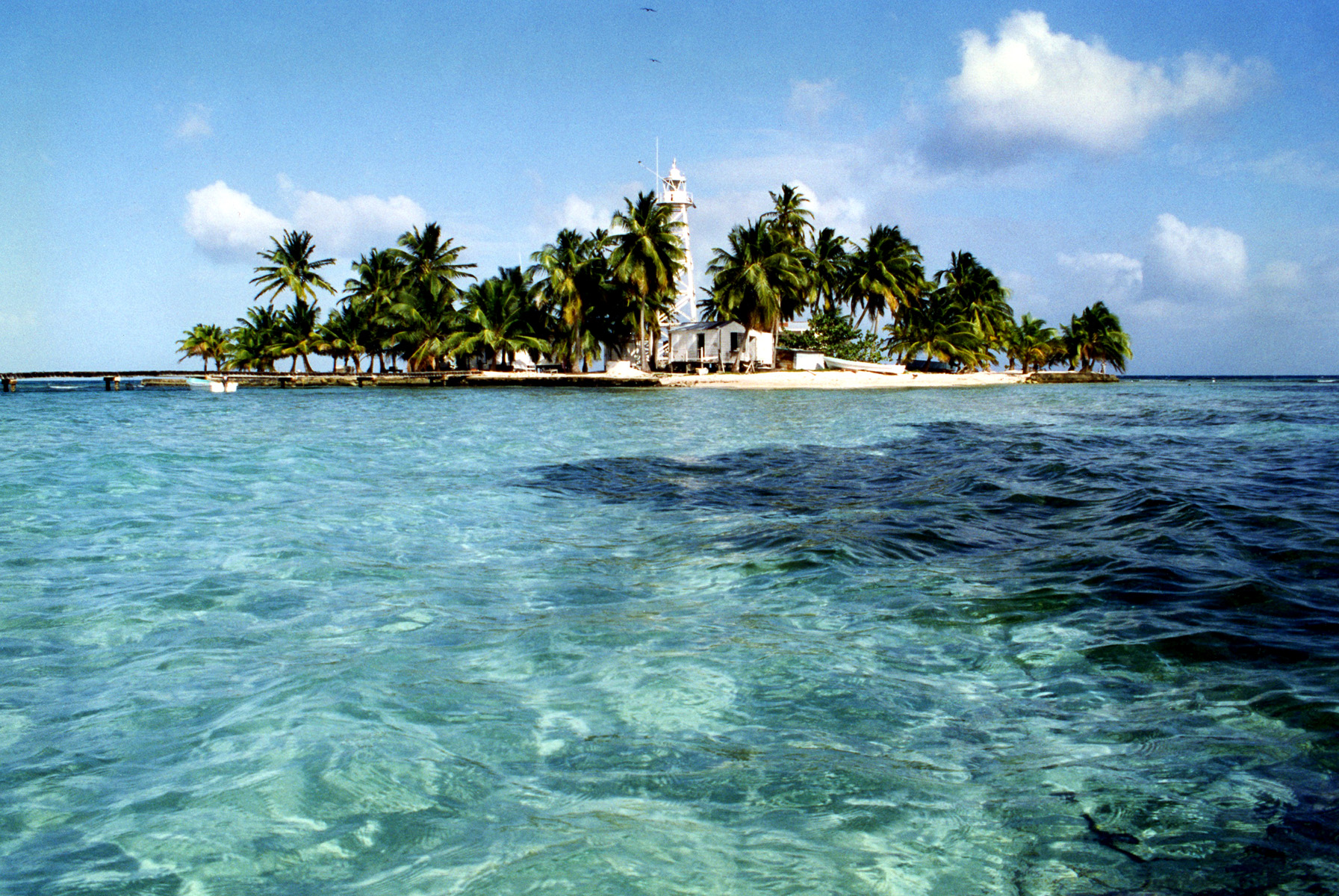
- The light and island in 1997
- Location: English Caye, Belize
- Coordinates: 17.327123°N 88.048907°W

Tower
- Constructed: 1846 (first)
- Construction: metal skeletal tower
- Height: 19 metres (62 ft)
- Shape: square pyramidal tower with balcony and lantern
- Markings: white tower and lantern
- Power source: solar power

Light
- Focal height: 19 metres (62 ft)
- Range: 11 nmi (20 km; 13 mi)
- Characteristic: Fl W 2.5s.

English Caye Light is an active lighthouse on a small island in Belize. The white lantern is mounted on a 19m high framework tower, and also has a focal plane of 19 m (62 ft).

== See also ==
- List of lighthouses in Belize
