= Half Moon Caye Light =

Lighthouse in Belize

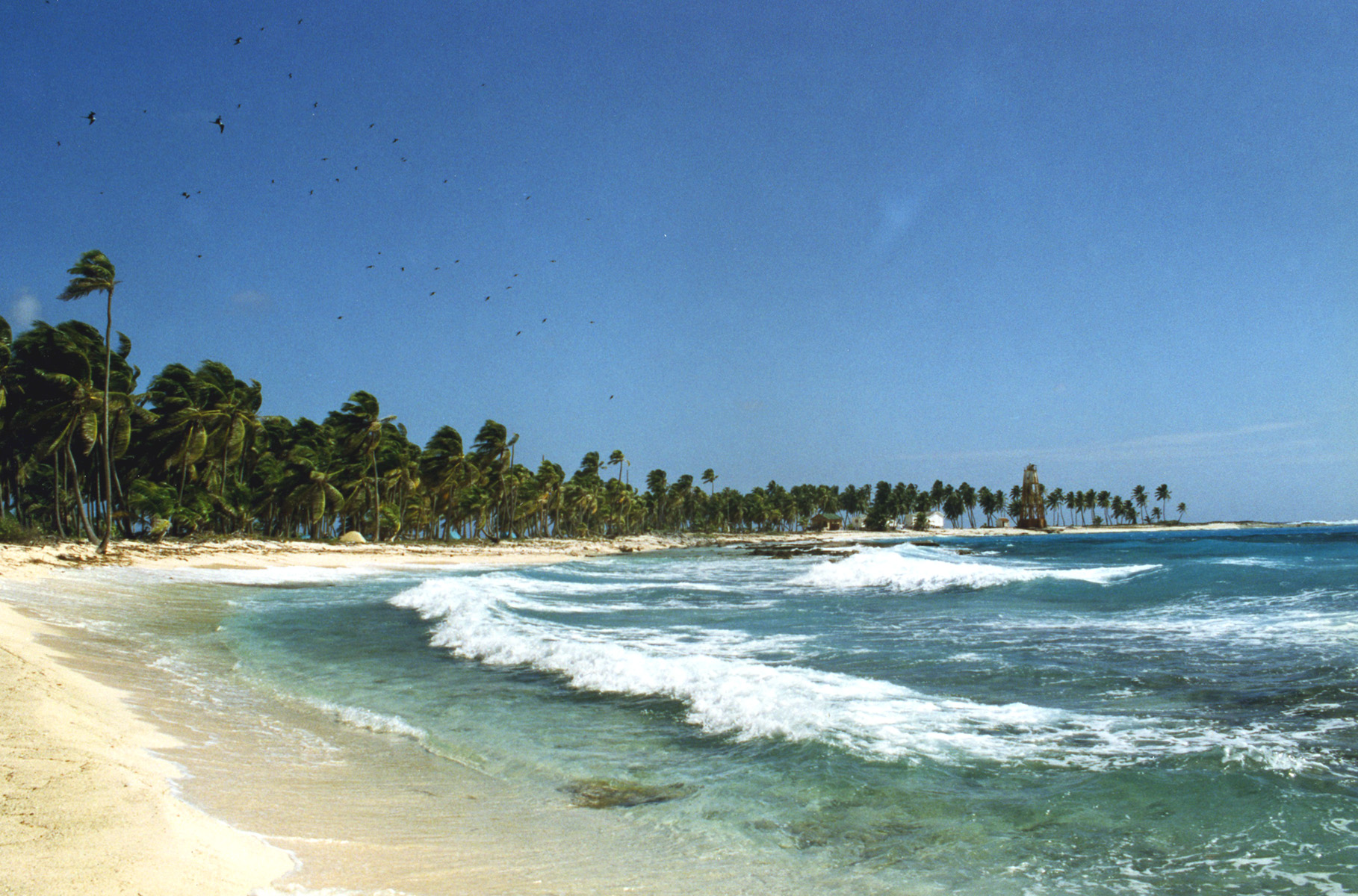
- Location: Half Moon Caye, Belize
- Coordinates: 17°12′20″N 87°32′03″W

Tower
- Construction: metal skeletal tower
- Height: 24 m (79 ft)
- Shape: square pyramidal tower with balcony and no lantern
- Markings: white tower and lantern
- Operator: Half Moon Caye Natural Monument

Light
- First lit: 1998
- Focal height: 24 m (79 ft)
- Range: 14 nmi (26 km; 16 mi)
- Characteristic: Fl(4) W 10s
- Original lighthouse
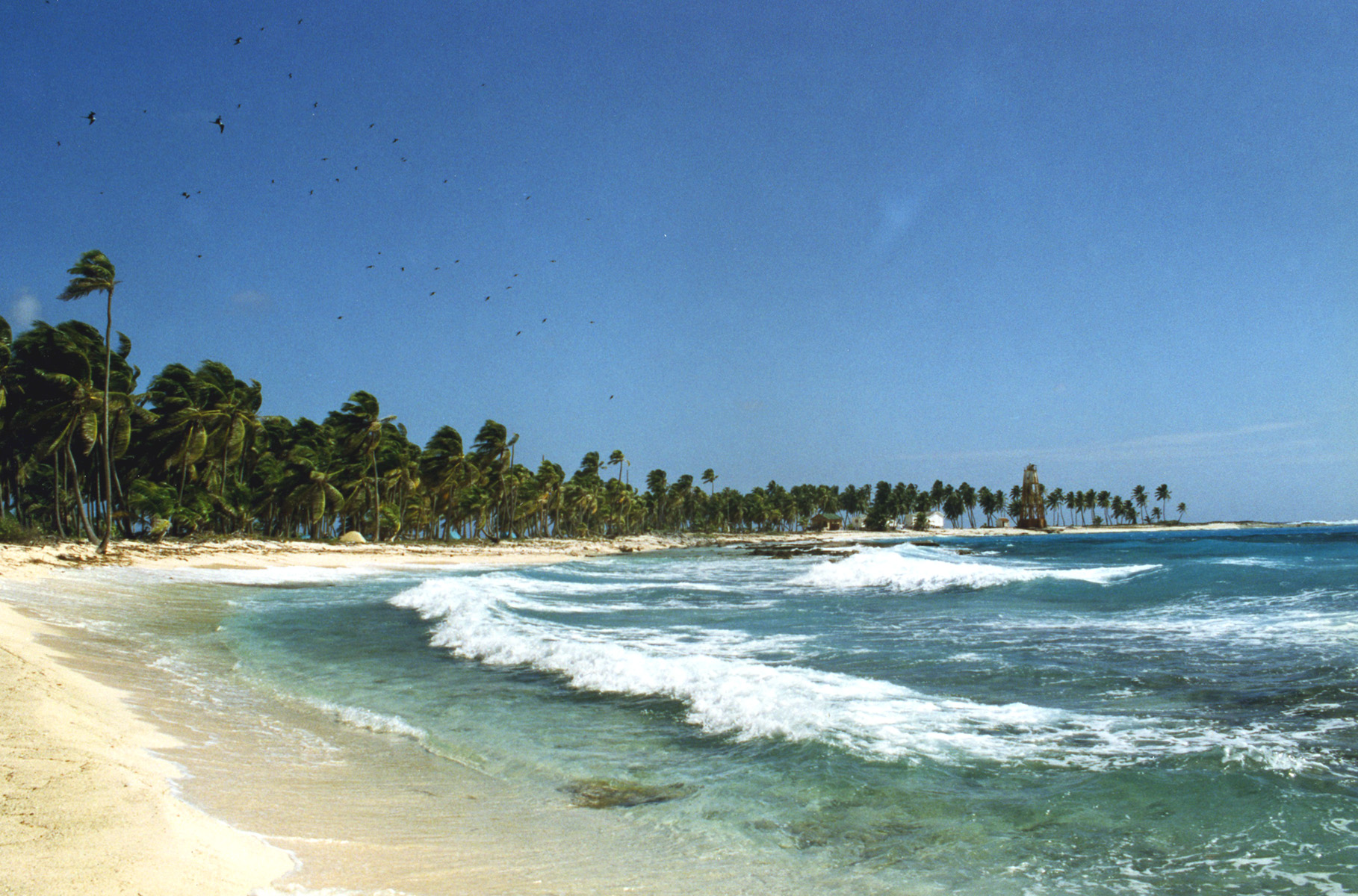
- The east side of the Island and the old lighthouse in the distance.
- Constructed: 1820
- Foundation: brick basement
- Construction: metal skeletal tower
- Height: 24 m (79 ft)
- Shape: square pyramidal tower with balcony and lantern
- First lit: 1931
- Deactivated: 1997

Half Moon Caye Lighthouse is a lighthouse on the Half Moon Caye located in the Lighthouse Reef in Belize.

== History ==
The station was originally established in 1820, the lighthouse was formed by a skeletal tower restored in 1848 and reinforced with a steel frame in 1931. It had a square truncated shape, with enclosed base and an upper observation room, balcony and lantern and a height of 24 metres (79 ft). In the latest years the lighthouse moved progressively toward the water because the trend in the weather change. The lighthouse was deactivated in 1997 and from then begun to wreck. A new skeletal tower was built in 1998 inland respect to the former light, it is equipped with a beacon which emits four white flashes every 10 seconds. In September 2010 the Tropical Storm Matthew destroyed completely the old lighthouse.

== See also ==
- List of lighthouses in Belize
