= Bugle Caye Light =

Lighthouse in Belize

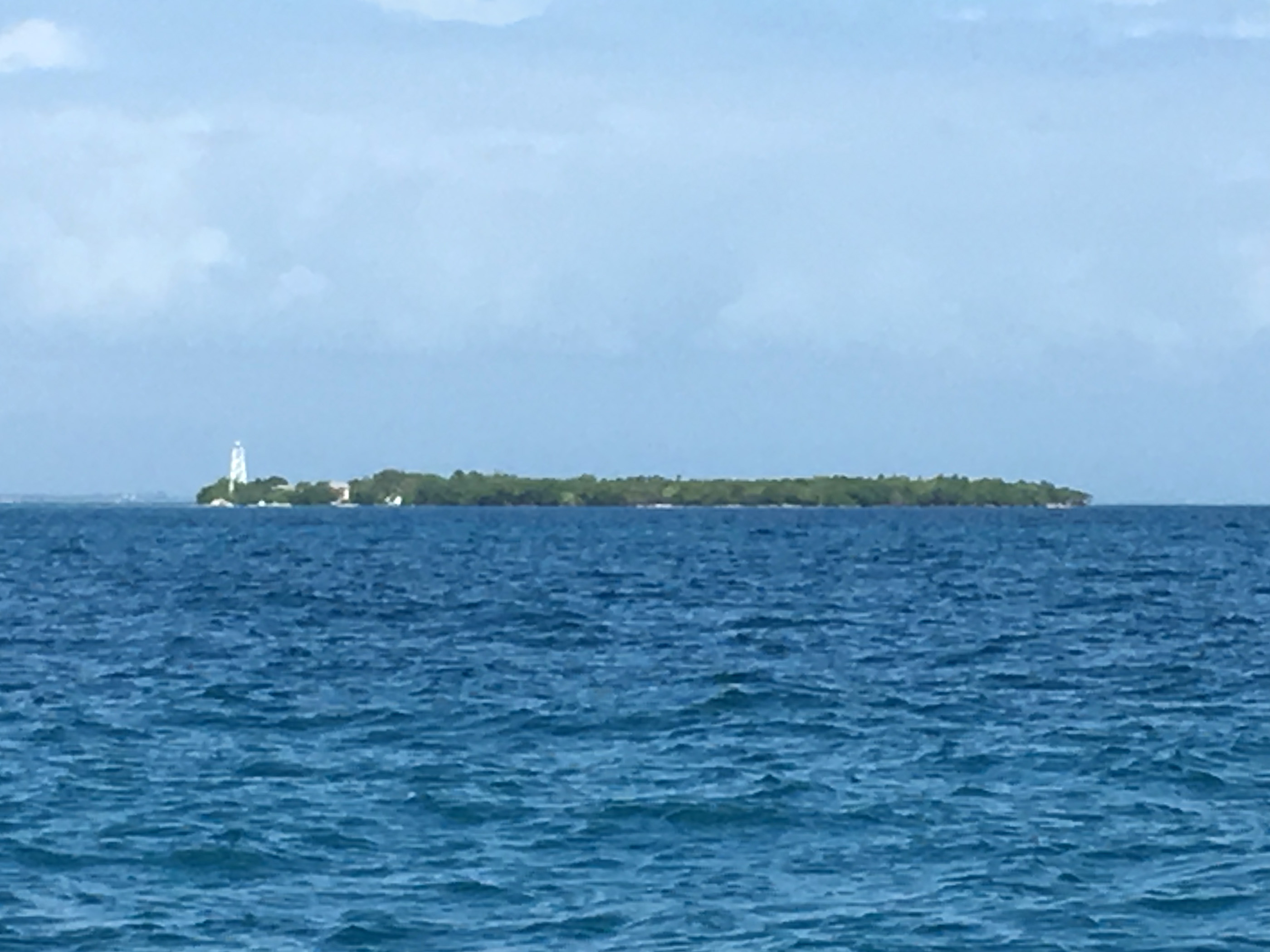
- Bugle Caye, with lighthouse on the left
- Location: Bugle Caye; Belize
- Coordinates: 16.488094°N 88.323700°W

Tower
- Constructed: 1885
- Construction: metal skeletal tower
- Height: 19 metres (62 ft)
- Shape: square pyramidal tower with balcony and no lantern
- Markings: white tower
- Power source: solar power

Light
- Focal height: 19 metres (62 ft)
- Range: 10 nmi (19 km; 12 mi)
- Characteristic: Fl W 10s.

Bugle Caye Lighthouse is a lighthouse in Belize. The station was originally established in 1885 and has a focal plane 19 m (62 ft). It is located on the small Bugle Caye off the coast about 130 km (80 mi) south of Belize City and 5 kilometres (3.1 mi) from Placencia.

== See also ==
- List of lighthouses in Belize
