= Mauger Caye Light =

Lighthouse in Belize

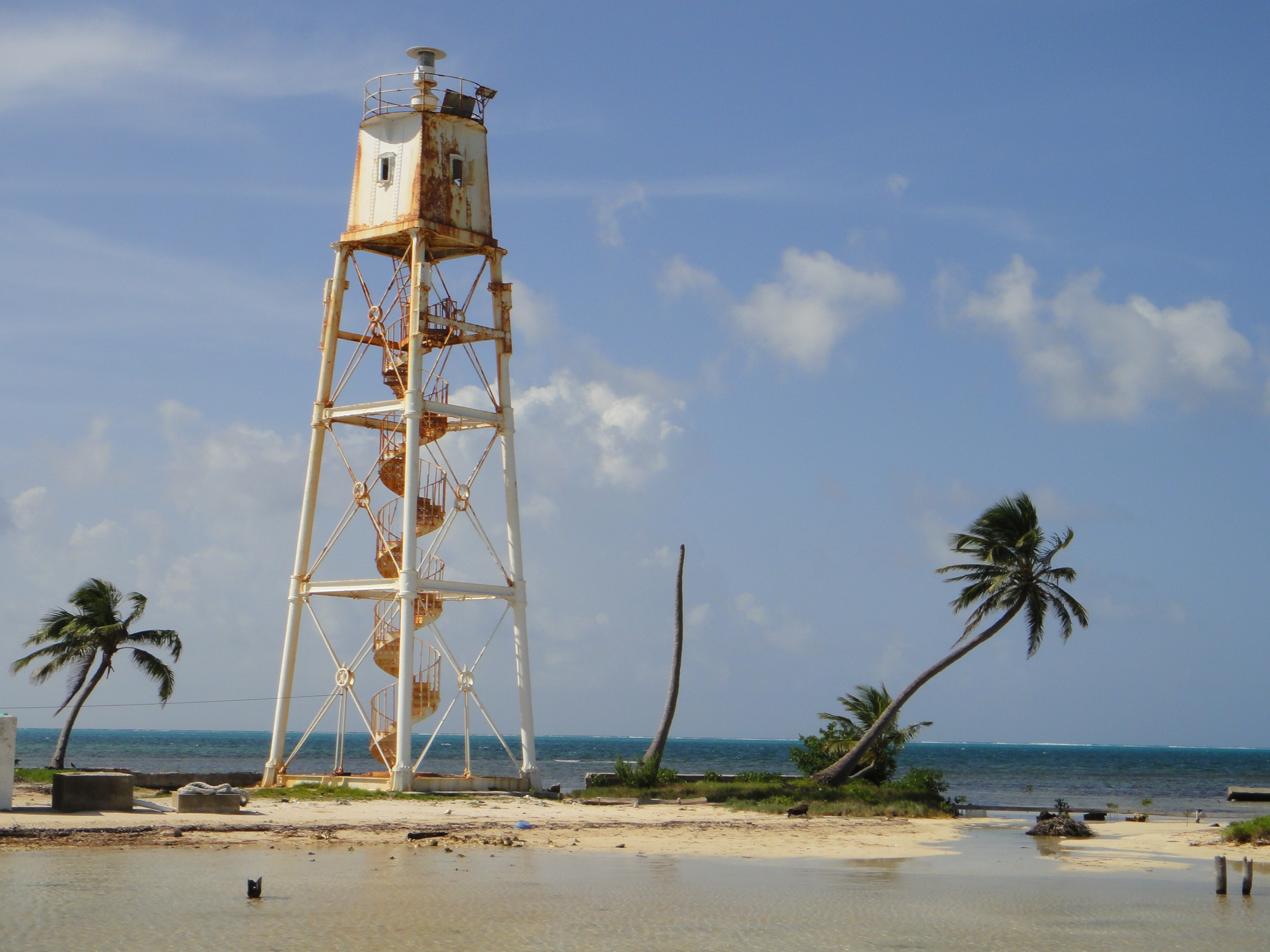
- Mauger Caye Lighthouse
- Location: Turneffe Atoll; Belize
- Coordinates: 17.60723°N 87.77242°W

Tower
- Constructed: 1878 (first)
- Construction: metal skeletal tower
- Height: 19 metres (62 ft)
- Shape: square pyramidal tower with balcony and observation room
- Markings: white tower and observation room
- Power source: solar power

Light
- Focal height: 19 metres (62 ft)
- Range: 13 nautical miles (24 km; 15 mi)
- Characteristic: Fl (2) W 10s.

Mauger Caye Light is an active lighthouse on the atoll island of Mauger Caye, the most northerly in the Turneffe Cays archipelago, which lies 30 km (19 mi) east of the coast of Belize. It is one of a number of lighthouses, which have been built on the cays in the coastal waters of Belize. At the southern end of the Turneffe atoll, is a similar but smaller light known as Caye Bokel. The name Mauger comes from the Creole word for meagre, and Bokel is from the Dutch word for elbow.

== Description ==
The lighthouse consists of a white framework tower which is 19m high; the light is mounted above a watch room and gallery at the top of the tower. A spiral staircase incorporated within the tower allows access to the room and light.

The low-lying nature of the island means the light also has a focal height of 19m above sea level, which has a range of 13 nautical miles and consists of a pattern of two flashes of white light every ten seconds.

The exposed nature of the site means it can be vulnerable to passing hurricanes. During Hurricane Keith the island was badly damaged, with sands being shifted and washed away, exposing the roots of the many palm trees. The duty light keepers, "only survived because they were able to take shelter in a concrete bunker near the lighthouse accommodation, which itself completely disappeared".

The lighthouse is operated and maintained by the port authority of Belize. It is registered under the Admiralty number J5940 and has the NGA identifier of 110–16280. The surrounding coral reef means the island is a popular dive site, which can be reached by boat from Belize.

== See also ==
- List of lighthouses in Belize
