= L(a =

Poem by E. E. Cummings

l(a

le
af
fa

ll

s)
one
l

iness

— E. E. Cummings

"l(a" is a poem by E. E. Cummings. It is the first poem in his 1958 collection 95 Poems.

"l(a" is arranged vertically in groups of one to five letters. When the text is laid out horizontally, it either reads as l(a leaf falls)oneliness —in other words, a leaf falls inserted between the first two letters of loneliness- or l(a le af fa ll s) one l iness, with a le af fa ll s between a l and one.

Cummings biographer Richard S. Kennedy calls the poem "the most delicately beautiful literary construct that Cummings ever created".

== Analysis ==
In analyzing the poem, Robert DiYanni notes that the image of a single falling leaf is a common symbol for loneliness, and that this sense of loneliness is enhanced by the structure of the poem. He writes that the fragmentation of the words "illustrates visually the separation that is the primary cause of loneliness". The fragmentation of the word loneliness is especially significant, since it highlights the fact that that word contains the word one. In addition, the isolated letter l can initially appear to be the numeral one. It creates the effect that the leaf is still one, or "oneliness" whole within itself, even after it is isolated from the tree. Robert Scott Root-Bernstein observes that the overall shape of the poem resembles a 1.

== Adaptations ==
Composers who have set this poem to music include:

- Matthew Peterson in "l(a leaf falls)oneliness" (2022) for SATB chorus a cappella.
- Peter Schickele in "Dim/l(a" (1967), for SATB chorus a cappella.
- Maurice Wright in "l(a" (1978), for SSA chorus, trumpet, violoncello and piano.
- Matthew DeFamio in "l(a", for horn and piano.
