= City of Los Angeles (disambiguation) =

The City of Los Angeles is the most populous city in California, and the second most populous in the United States.

City of Los Angeles may also refer to:

- Government of Los Angeles, the government of the city of Los Angeles
- City of Los Angeles (train), a train
