= La (Javanese) =

Syllabic letter of the Javanese script

la
- ꦭ
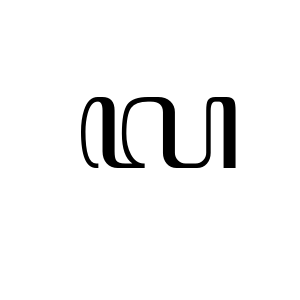
- Aksara nglegena

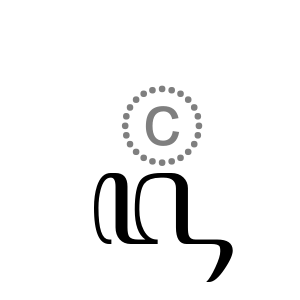
- Aksara pasangan

Usage
- Writing system: Javanese script
- Latin orthography: la
- Sound values: [l]
- In Unicode: A9AD

ꦭ is one of the syllables in the Javanese script that represents the sounds /lɔ/, /la/. It is transliterated to Latin as "la", and sometimes in Indonesian orthography as "lo". It has two other forms (pasangan), which are ◌꧀ꦭ and ◌꧀ꦭꦸ (if followed by 'ꦸ' and several other glyphs), but represented by a single Unicode code point, U+A9AD.

== Pasangan ==
Its pasangan form ◌꧀ꦭ, is located on the bottom side of the previous syllable. For example, ꦲꦤꦏ꧀ꦭꦺꦴꦫꦺꦴ - anak loro (two kids).

The pasangan has two forms, the other is used when the pasangan is followed by 'ꦸ', 'ꦹ', 'ꦿ', 'ꦽ', or 'ꦾ'. For example, ꦲꦤꦏ꧀ꦭꦸꦫꦃ - anak lurah (the child of a lurah)

== Murda ==
The letter ꦭ doesn't have a murda form.

== Glyphs ==
Nglegena forms				Pasangan forms			
ꦭ la	ꦭꦃ lah	ꦭꦁ lang	ꦭꦂ lar	◌꧀ꦭ -la	◌꧀ꦭꦃ -lah	◌꧀ꦭꦁ -lang	◌꧀ꦭꦂ -lar
ꦭꦺ le	ꦭꦺꦃ leh	ꦭꦺꦁ leng	ꦭꦺꦂ ler	◌꧀ꦭꦺ -le	◌꧀ꦭꦺꦃ -leh	◌꧀ꦭꦺꦁ -leng	◌꧀ꦭꦺꦂ -ler
ꦭꦼ lê	ꦭꦼꦃ lêh	ꦭꦼꦁ lêng	ꦭꦼꦂ lêr	◌꧀ꦭꦼ -lê	◌꧀ꦭꦼꦃ -lêh	◌꧀ꦭꦼꦁ -lêng	◌꧀ꦭꦼꦂ -lêr
ꦭꦶ li	ꦭꦶꦃ lih	ꦭꦶꦁ ling	ꦭꦶꦂ lir	◌꧀ꦭꦶ -li	◌꧀ꦭꦶꦃ -lih	◌꧀ꦭꦶꦁ -ling	◌꧀ꦭꦶꦂ -lir
ꦭꦺꦴ lo	ꦭꦺꦴꦃ loh	ꦭꦺꦴꦁ long	ꦭꦺꦴꦂ lor	◌꧀ꦭꦺꦴ -lo	◌꧀ꦭꦺꦴꦃ -loh	◌꧀ꦭꦺꦴꦁ -long	◌꧀ꦭꦺꦴꦂ -lor
ꦭꦸ lu	ꦭꦸꦃ luh	ꦭꦸꦁ lung	ꦭꦸꦂ lur	◌꧀ꦭꦸ -lu	◌꧀ꦭꦸꦃ -luh	◌꧀ꦭꦸꦁ -lung	◌꧀ꦭꦸꦂ -lur
ꦭꦿ lra	ꦭꦿꦃ lrah	ꦭꦿꦁ lrang	ꦭꦿꦂ lrar	◌꧀ꦭꦿ -lra	◌꧀ꦭꦿꦃ -lrah	◌꧀ꦭꦿꦁ -lrang	◌꧀ꦭꦿꦂ -lrar
ꦭꦿꦺ lre	ꦭꦿꦺꦃ lreh	ꦭꦿꦺꦁ lreng	ꦭꦿꦺꦂ lrer	◌꧀ꦭꦿꦺ -lre	◌꧀ꦭꦿꦺꦃ -lreh	◌꧀ꦭꦿꦺꦁ -lreng	◌꧀ꦭꦿꦺꦂ -lrer
ꦭꦽ lrê	ꦭꦽꦃ lrêh	ꦭꦽꦁ lrêng	ꦭꦽꦂ lrêr	◌꧀ꦭꦽ -lrê	◌꧀ꦭꦽꦃ -lrêh	◌꧀ꦭꦽꦁ -lrêng	◌꧀ꦭꦽꦂ -lrêr
ꦭꦿꦶ lri	ꦭꦿꦶꦃ lrih	ꦭꦿꦶꦁ lring	ꦭꦿꦶꦂ lrir	◌꧀ꦭꦿꦶ -lri	◌꧀ꦭꦿꦶꦃ -lrih	◌꧀ꦭꦿꦶꦁ -lring	◌꧀ꦭꦿꦶꦂ -lrir
ꦭꦿꦺꦴ lro	ꦭꦿꦺꦴꦃ lroh	ꦭꦿꦺꦴꦁ lrong	ꦭꦿꦺꦴꦂ lror	◌꧀ꦭꦿꦺꦴ -lro	◌꧀ꦭꦿꦺꦴꦃ -lroh	◌꧀ꦭꦿꦺꦴꦁ -lrong	◌꧀ꦭꦿꦺꦴꦂ -lror
ꦭꦿꦸ lru	ꦭꦿꦸꦃ lruh	ꦭꦿꦸꦁ lrung	ꦭꦿꦸꦂ lrur	◌꧀ꦭꦿꦸ -lru	◌꧀ꦭꦿꦸꦃ -lruh	◌꧀ꦭꦿꦸꦁ -lrung	◌꧀ꦭꦿꦸꦂ -lrur
ꦭꦾ lya	ꦭꦾꦃ lyah	ꦭꦾꦁ lyang	ꦭꦾꦂ lyar	◌꧀ꦭꦾ -lya	◌꧀ꦭꦾꦃ -lyah	◌꧀ꦭꦾꦁ -lyang	◌꧀ꦭꦾꦂ -lyar
ꦭꦾꦺ lye	ꦭꦾꦺꦃ lyeh	ꦭꦾꦺꦁ lyeng	ꦭꦾꦺꦂ lyer	◌꧀ꦭꦾꦺ -lye	◌꧀ꦭꦾꦺꦃ -lyeh	◌꧀ꦭꦾꦺꦁ -lyeng	◌꧀ꦭꦾꦺꦂ -lyer
ꦭꦾꦼ lyê	ꦭꦾꦼꦃ lyêh	ꦭꦾꦼꦁ lyêng	ꦭꦾꦼꦂ lyêr	◌꧀ꦭꦾꦼ -lyê	◌꧀ꦭꦾꦼꦃ -lyêh	◌꧀ꦭꦾꦼꦁ -lyêng	◌꧀ꦭꦾꦼꦂ -lyêr
ꦭꦾꦶ lyi	ꦭꦾꦶꦃ lyih	ꦭꦾꦶꦁ lying	ꦭꦾꦶꦂ lyir	◌꧀ꦭꦾꦶ -lyi	◌꧀ꦭꦾꦶꦃ -lyih	◌꧀ꦭꦾꦶꦁ -lying	◌꧀ꦭꦾꦶꦂ -lyir
ꦭꦾꦺꦴ lyo	ꦭꦾꦺꦴꦃ lyoh	ꦭꦾꦺꦴꦁ lyong	ꦭꦾꦺꦴꦂ lyor	◌꧀ꦭꦾꦺꦴ -lyo	◌꧀ꦭꦾꦺꦴꦃ -lyoh	◌꧀ꦭꦾꦺꦴꦁ -lyong	◌꧀ꦭꦾꦺꦴꦂ -lyor
ꦭꦾꦸ lyu	ꦭꦾꦸꦃ lyuh	ꦭꦾꦸꦁ lyung	ꦭꦾꦸꦂ lyur	◌꧀ꦭꦾꦸ -lyu	◌꧀ꦭꦾꦸꦃ -lyuh	◌꧀ꦭꦾꦸꦁ -lyung	◌꧀ꦭꦾꦸꦂ -lyur

== Unicode block ==
Javanese script was added to the Unicode Standard in October, 2009 with the release of version 5.2.

Javanese^{[1]}^{[2]} Official Unicode Consortium code chart (PDF)
	0	1	2	3	4	5	6	7	8	9	A	B	C	D	E	F
U+A98x	ꦀ	ꦁ	ꦂ	ꦃ	ꦄ	ꦅ	ꦆ	ꦇ	ꦈ	ꦉ	ꦊ	ꦋ	ꦌ	ꦍ	ꦎ	ꦏ
U+A99x	ꦐ	ꦑ	ꦒ	ꦓ	ꦔ	ꦕ	ꦖ	ꦗ	ꦘ	ꦙ	ꦚ	ꦛ	ꦜ	ꦝ	ꦞ	ꦟ
U+A9Ax	ꦠ	ꦡ	ꦢ	ꦣ	ꦤ	ꦥ	ꦦ	ꦧ	ꦨ	ꦩ	ꦪ	ꦫ	ꦬ	ꦭ	ꦮ	ꦯ
U+A9Bx	ꦰ	ꦱ	ꦲ	꦳	ꦴ	ꦵ	ꦶ	ꦷ	ꦸ	ꦹ	ꦺ	ꦻ	ꦼ	ꦽ	ꦾ	ꦿ
U+A9Cx	꧀	꧁	꧂	꧃	꧄	꧅	꧆	꧇	꧈	꧉	꧊	꧋	꧌	꧍		ꧏ
U+A9Dx	꧐	꧑	꧒	꧓	꧔	꧕	꧖	꧗	꧘	꧙					꧞	꧟
Notes 1.As of Unicode version 17.0 2.Grey areas indicate non-assigned code points
