= Los Ángeles (band) =

Spanish pop group

Los Ángeles were a Spanish pop group active 1963-1976. Originally the band was known as Los Ángeles Azules (The Blue Angels), the "Azules" was dropped when contracted by Hispavox, a major Spanish label, in 1967.

On September 26, 1976, the band were on their way to Madrid after playing in Tarragona the previous day. The car, which was carrying Poncho Gonzalez (drummer) and Jose Luis Avellaneda (guitarist), crashed in Motilla del Palancar, killing both band members. Carlos Alvarez, the other guitarist, suffered serious injuries that would keep him hospitalized for a long time. The bassist, Paco Quero, also survived.

== Discography ==
- Los Ángeles (1967)
- Pequeñas cosas (1972)

Singles

- 98.6
- Dime, dime
- Mañana, mañana
- Créeme
- Momentos
- Mónica
- Abre tu ventana
- Raquel
- Nada va a cambiar el mundo
- Quiero que seas tú
- Pequeñas cosas
