= USS Los Angeles (ID-1470) =

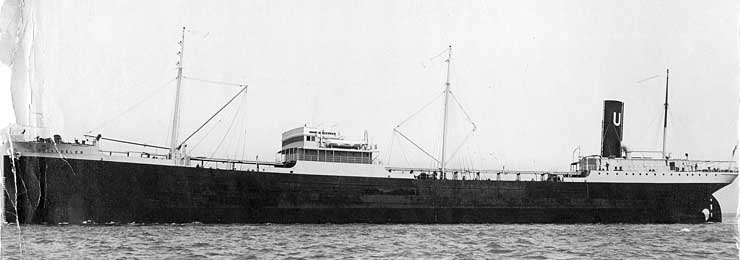
- A damaged photograph of SS Los Angeles in 1916 or 1917, prior to her United States Navy service.

History

United States
- Name: SS Los Angeles
- Namesake: Los Angeles, California
- Owner: Union Oil Company of California
- Operator: Union Oil Company of California
- Builder: Union Iron Works, San Francisco, California
- Completed: 1916
- Fate: Chartered to U.S. Navy 1917
- Acquired: Returned by U.S. Navy 17 January 1919
- Renamed: SS Toteco 1941
- Fate: Scrapped 1966

History

United States
- Name: USS Los Angeles
- Namesake: Previous name retained
- Operator: United States Navy
- Acquired: 1917
- Commissioned: 9 August 1917
- Decommissioned: 17 January 1919
- Fate: Returned to owner 17 January 1919

General characteristics
- Type: Tanker
- Tonnage: 6,876 Gross register tons
- Displacement: 10,700 tons
- Length: 435 ft (133 m) between perpendiculars
- Beam: 56 ft (17 m)
- Draft: 27 ft (8.2 m)
- Propulsion: Steam engine, one shaft
- Speed: 10 knots
- Complement: 72
- Armament: 1 × 5-inch (127-millimeter) gun; 1 × 3-inch (76.2-millimeter) gun

The first USS Los Angeles (ID-1470) was a tanker in commission in the United States Navy from 1917 to 1919. she served during World War I.

== Construction, acquisition, and commissioning ==
SS Los Angeles was built by Union Iron Works at San Francisco, California, as a commercial tanker in 1916 for the Union Oil Company of California. The U.S. Navy acquired her from Union Oil in 1917 for World War I service under a bareboat charter, gave her the naval registry Identification Number (Id. No.) 1470, and commissioned her as USS Los Angeles on 9 August 1917 at New Orleans, Louisiana, with Lieutenant Commander Alexander Mackenzie in command.

== Service history ==
=== U.S. Navy service ===
After commissioning and through the end of 1917, Los Angeles operated along the United States East Coast and United States Gulf Coast and made two cruises with the Atlantic Train Force.

On 9 January 1918, Los Angeles was assigned to duty with the Naval Overseas Transportation Service and, after loading cargo at New York City, departed New York on 15 January 1918 for the British Isles. She reached Scapa Flow in the Orkney Islands on 4 February 1918, discharged her cargo there, and departed on 7 February 1918 for the U.S. East Coast, where she arrived on 27 February 1918.

On 4 March 1918, Los Angeles departed New York for Port Arthur, Texas. Arriving there on 10 March 1918, she loaded fuel oil before departing for Hampton Roads, Virginia, on 14 March 1918. She arrived at Hampton Roads on 20 March 1918, then departed on 21 March 1918 to join a convoy bound for Europe. Between 21 March 1918 and 10 November 1918, Los Angeles made four transatlantic runs from U.S. East Coast ports, carrying fuel oil to Brest in France and to Portsmouth and Devonport in England.

During the latter part of November 1918, Los Angeles transported a cargo of fuel oil from Philadelphia, Pennsylvania, to Cristóbal in the Panama Canal Zone. After loading crude oil at Tuxpan, Mexico, she returned to New York on 16 December 1918.

Los Angeles was decommissioned at New York on 17 January 1919 and was returned to Union Oil the same day.

=== Later service ===
The ship resumed commercial service as S.S. Los Angeles. She was renamed S.S. Toteco in 1941.

== Fate ==
Toteco was scrapped in Mexico in 1966.

== Honors and awards ==
- World War I Victory Medal with TRANSPORT Clasp
