= Turneffe Atoll =

Atoll off the coast of Belize, Central America

Coordinates: 17°20′N 87°52′W

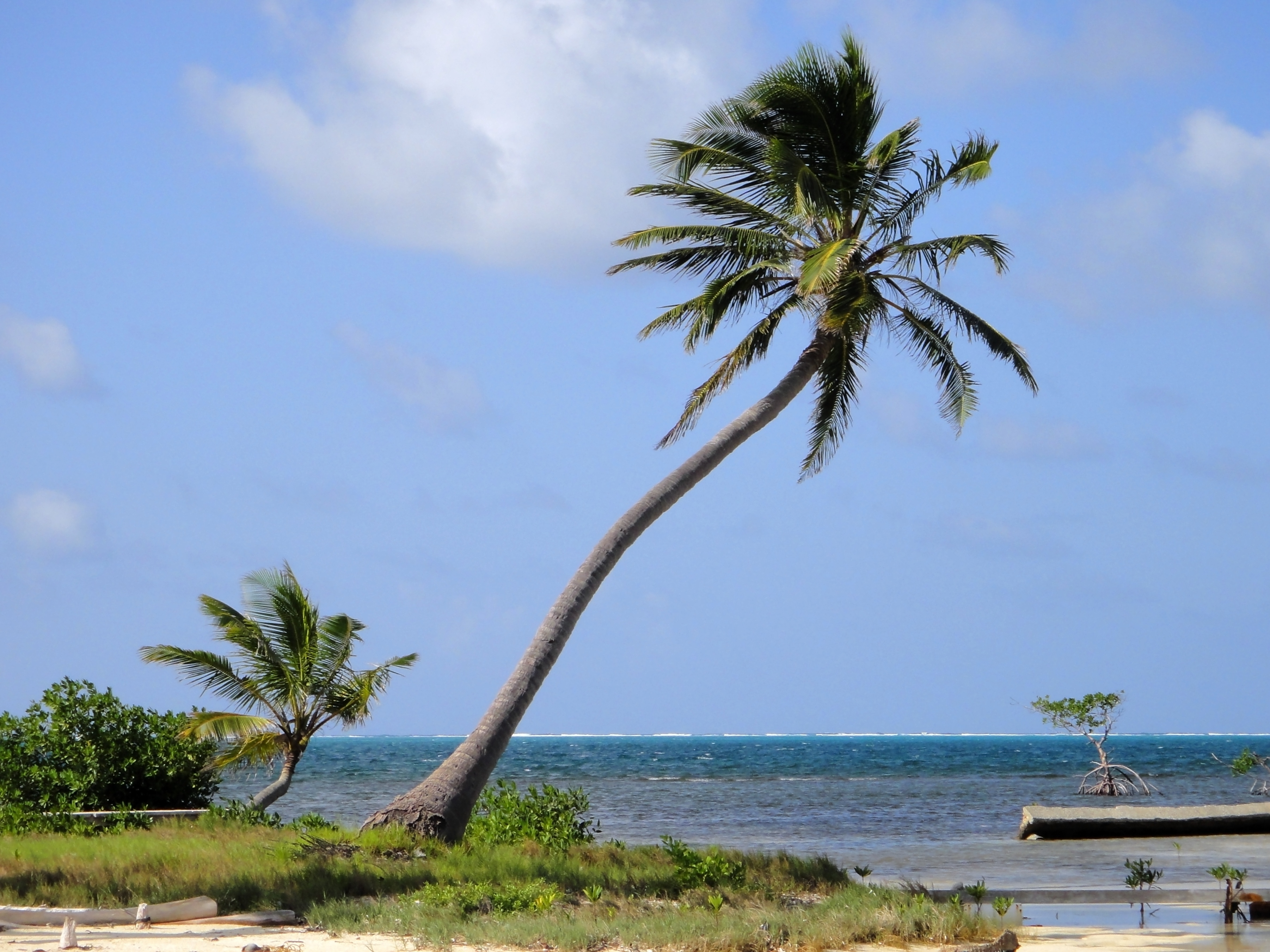
Douglas Caye (West)

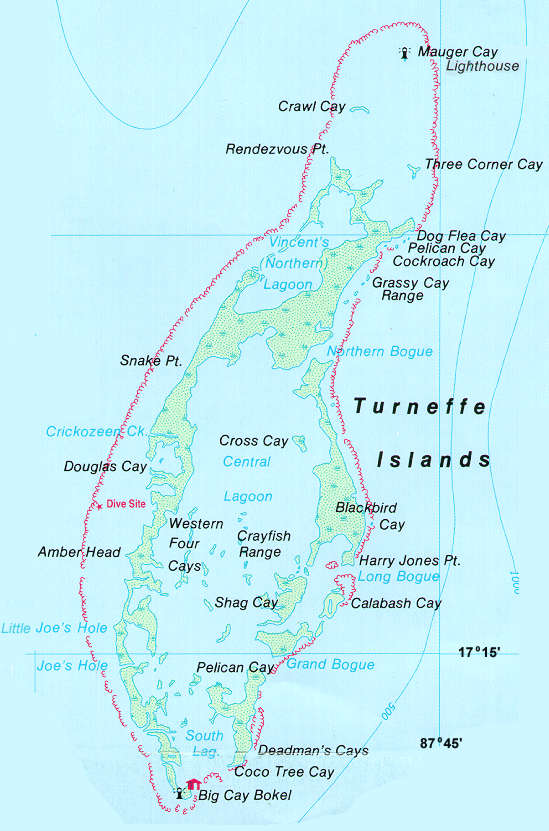
Nautical map of Turneffe Islands

Turneffe Atoll is located southeast of Ambergris Caye and Caye Caulker, off the coast of Belize in Central America, 20 miles (32 kilometres) from Belize City. It is one of three atolls of the Belize Barrier Reef, along with Glover's Reef and Lighthouse Reef. It is approximately 30 miles (48 kilometres) long and 10 miles (16 kilometres) wide, making it the largest coral atoll in Belize and in the Mesoamerican Barrier Reef System. The atoll was officially declared a marine reserve on November 22, 2012.

In October 2013, the Ministry and the Belize Fisheries Department appointed the Turneffe Atoll Sustainability Association (TASA) to co-manage the Reserve's day-to-day operations. The creation of the reserve was championed and supported by a number of NGOs and foundations including the Blue Marine Foundation, the Bertarelli Foundation and the Oak Foundation.

Turneffe is home to many marine species that are threatened and/or commercially important. The land and seascape consists of a network of highly productive flats, creeks, and lagoons dotted by more than 150 mangrove islands and higher cayes with savanna and littoral forest. Large expanses of intact mangrove and seagrass habitat and shallows provide important nursery functionality for a wide array of fish species, crocodiles, lobster, conch and other invertebrates. It is home to more than 500 species of fish, 65 species of stony corals, sea turtles, manatees, dolphins, seabirds, and other wildlife. In addition, at least three known important fish spawning aggregation sites have been identified.

At the northern end of the island group is Mauger Caye, with its eponymous lighthouse, the southern end has a smaller aid to navigation on Caye Bokel.

== History ==
The infamous pirate Blackbeard, also known as Edward Teach, spent the winter of 1717–1718 harassing ships sailing to and from the port of Vera Cruz, Mexico and traversing the Bay of Honduras. Between 4 and 5 April 1718, at Turneffe, Blackbeard captured the ten-gun logwood cutting sloop Adventure and forced its captain, David Herriot, to join him. Also on board was Edward Robinson, the ship’s gunner, who would later be involved in the Battle of Cape Fear River. Blackbeard then made Israel Hands captain of the Adventure and began sailing for North Carolina.
