= Los Ángeles, South Caribbean Coast Autonomous Region =

Nicaraguan town

Coordinates: 12°13′N 83°46′W

Los Ángeles is a town in the South Caribbean Coast Autonomous Region of Nicaragua. It is located within the Central Standard Time Zone (GMT-6).
