= Independence Airport (Belize) =

Belize coastal airport serving Independence and Mango Creek

- IATA: INB; ICAO: MZSV

Summary
- Airport type: Private
- Serves: Independence, Belize
- Elevation AMSL: 18 ft (5.5 m)
- Coordinates: 16°32′04″N 88°26′30″W

Map
- Location of Independence Airport in Belize

Runways
Direction	Length		Surface
Direction	m	ft	Surface
07/25	970	3,182	Asphalt
- Source: GCM Google Maps

Independence Airport (IATA: INB, ICAO: MZSV), also known as Savannah Airport or Mango Creek Airport, is an airport serving Independence and Mango Creek, a coastal community straddling the border between Toledo and Stann Creek Districts in Belize. The airport runs along the Independence Highway, 4 kilometres (2 mi) inland from the coast.

The Puerto Barrios VOR-DME (Ident: IOS) and non-directional beacon (Ident: BAR) are located 48.6 nautical miles (90 km) south of the airport.

== Airlines and destinations ==
Airlines	Destinations
Maya Island Air	Belize City–International, Belize City–Municipal, Caye Caulker, Caye Chapel, Corozal, Dangriga, Placencia, Punta Gorda, San Pedro
Tropic Air	San Pedro

== See also ==
- Transport in Belize
- List of airports in Belize
