= Sir Barry Bowen Municipal Airport =

Airport in Belize

Sir Barry Bowen Municipal Airport Belize City Municipal Airport
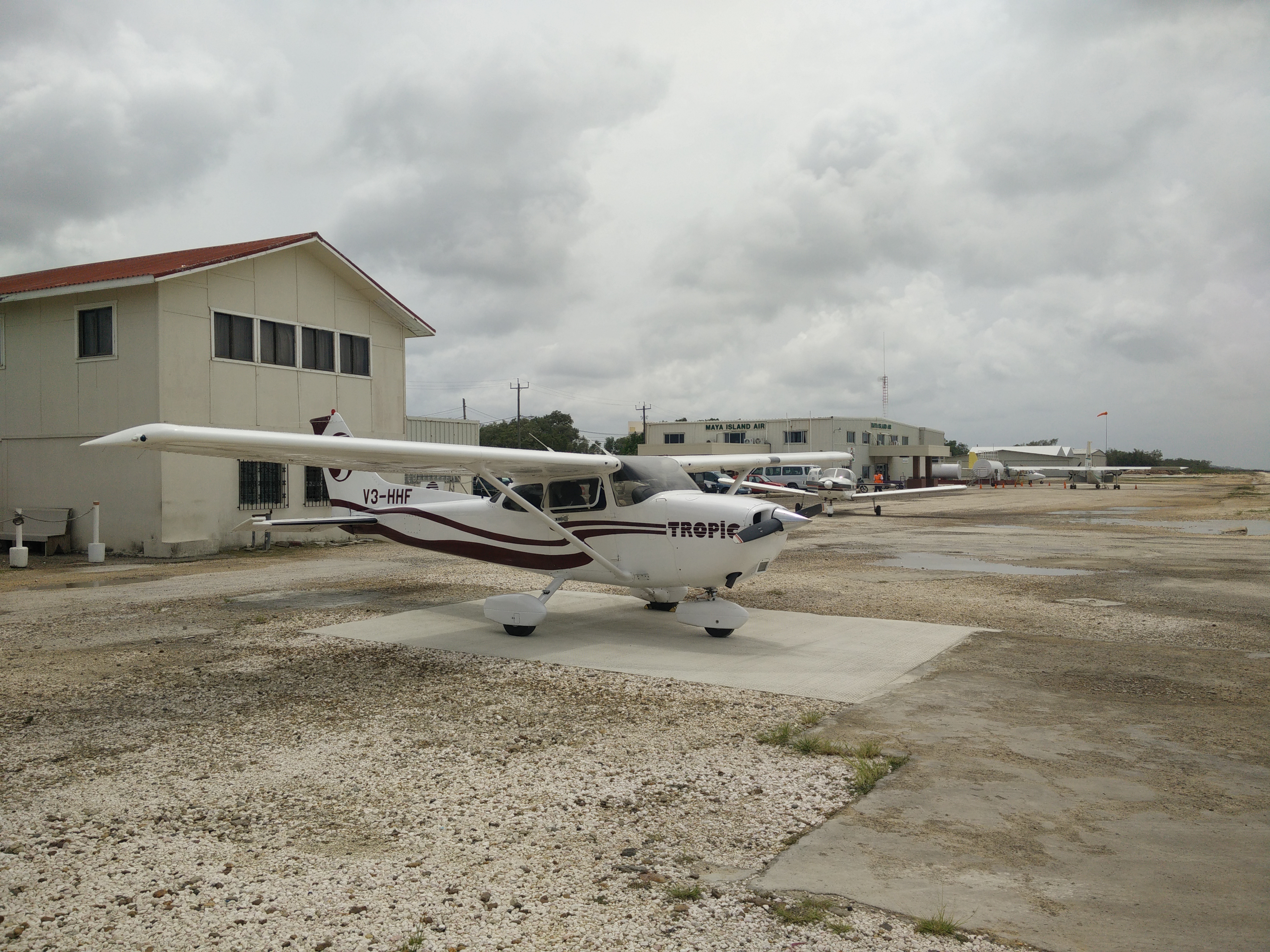
- IATA: TZA; ICAO: MZBE

Summary
- Airport type: Public
- Serves: Belize City, Belize
- Elevation AMSL: 8 ft / 2 m
- Coordinates: 17°31′03″N 88°11′45″W

Map
- Location in Belize

Runways
Direction	Length		Surface
Direction	m	ft	Surface
12/30	940	3,084	Asphalt
- Source: GCM AIC

Sir Barry Bowen Municipal Airport (formerly Belize City Municipal Airport) (IATA: TZA, ICAO: MZBE) is an airport serving Belize City, Belize. It is only one mile from the city center, and is more centrally located to the city than is Belize City International Airport. It mostly provides travel to Belize's cayes, allowing faster passage to the cayes than by boat or water taxi. The airport is named after the late Belizean politician and entrepreneur Barry Bowen.

The head office of Maya Island Air is on the airport. Tropic Air also has a terminal at this airport with multiple flights every day.

== Facilities ==
In 2012, a project to upgrade and modernize the airport was initiated. Improvements included extending the runway, constructing a new access road, adding a taxiway, and installing a new lighting system. The project was completed in November 2016 at a total cost of BZ$17 million.

== Airlines and destinations ==
Airlines	Destinations
Maya Island Air	Caye Caulker, Caye Chapel, Dangriga, Independence, Placencia, Punta Gorda, San Pedro
Tropic Air	Caye Caulker, Dangriga, Placencia, Punta Gorda, San Pedro, Silver Creek

== Shuttles ==
Belize Shuttles and Private Transfers provides regularly scheduled shuttles from the airport to Placencia, San Ignacio, Hopkins, and water taxi terminals.

== See also ==
- Transport in Belize
- List of airports in Belize
