= List of airlines of Belize =

This is a list of airlines currently operating in Belize.

== Active ==
Airline	Image	IATA	ICAO	Callsign	Founded	Notes
Maya Island Air		2M	MYD	MYLAND	1997	
Tropic Air		9N	TOS	TROPISER	1979	

== Defunct ==
Airline	Image	IATA	ICAO	Callsign	Founded	Ceased operations	Notes
Belize Air Cargo					1978	1981	
Belize Air International		BM			1987	1995	
Belize Airways		HB	BAL		1976	1980	
Maya Airways		MW	MAY	MAYA	1962	1997	Renamed to Maya Island Air
Toucan Air					1986	1987	

== See also ==
- List of airlines of the Americas
- List of defunct airlines of the Americas
