= Dangriga Airport =

Airport in Belize

Dangriga Airport Pelican Beach Airstrip
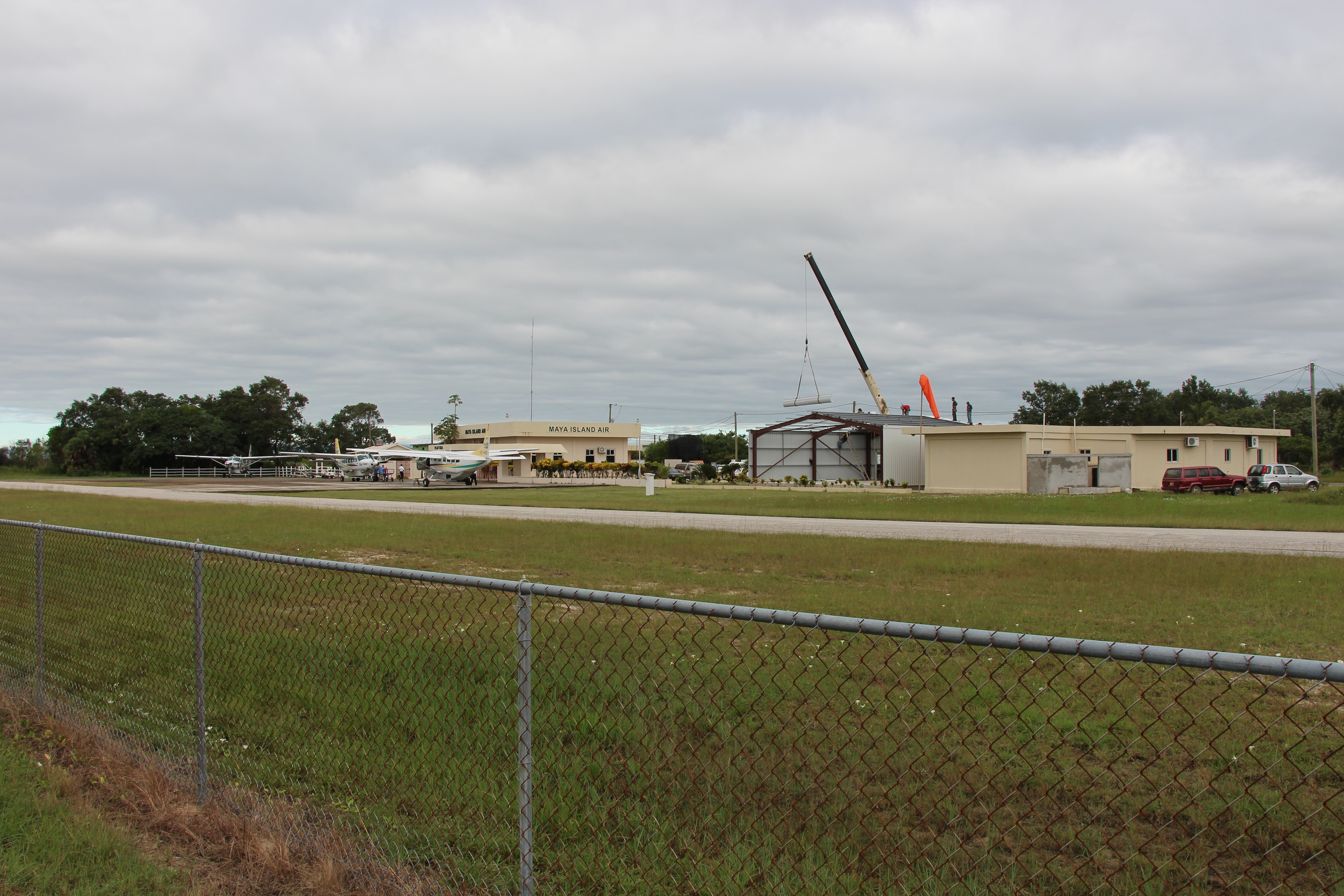
- IATA: DGA; ICAO: MZPB

Summary
- Airport type: Public
- Serves: Dangriga, Belize
- Elevation AMSL: 13 ft / 4 m
- Coordinates: 16°58′57″N 88°13′50″W

Map
- Location of Dangriga Airport in Belize

Runways
Direction	Length		Surface
Direction	m	ft	Surface
09/27	795	2,608	Asphalt
- Source: GCM

Dangriga Airport (IATA: DGA, ICAO: MZPB), also called Pelican Beach Airstrip, is a public use airport located 1 kilometre (1 mi) north of Dangriga, a coastal town in the Stann Creek District of Belize.

== Airlines and destinations ==
Airlines	Destinations
Maya Island Air	Belize City–International, Belize City–Municipal, Independence, Placencia
Tropic Air	Belize City–International, Belize City–Municipal, Placencia

== See also ==
- Transport in Belize
- List of airports in Belize
