= Silver Creek Airport =

Airport in Belize

Silver Creek Airport Kanantik Airstrip
- IATA: SVK; ICAO: MZKT

Summary
- Airport type: Private
- Serves: Stann Creek District, Belize
- Elevation AMSL: 66 ft / 20 m
- Coordinates: 16°41′05″N 88°20′59″W

Map
- Location of Silver Creek Airport in Belize

Runways
| Direction | Length | | Surface |
| Direction | m | ft | Surface |
|---|---|---|---|
| 10/28 | 880 | 2,887 | Gravel |
- Source: Landings.com Google Maps GCM

Silver Creek Airport (IATA: SVK, ICAO: MZKT) is an airport serving the Stann Creek District, Belize. The rural airport is 7 kilometres (4 mi) inland from the Caribbean coast, and 6 kilometres (4 mi) northeast of Santa Cruz.

The Belize VOR-DME (Ident: BZE) is located 48.9 nautical miles (91 km) north of the runway.

== Airlines and destinations ==
| Airlines | Destinations |
|---|---|
| Tropic Air | Belize City–Municipal |

== See also ==
- Transport in Belize
- List of airports in Belize
