= Maya Beach Village =

Village

Coordinates: 16.6152°N 88.3542°W

Maya Beach Village is a village in the Stann Creek District of Belize located on the Placencia Peninsula, between Riversdale Village and Seine Bight. Based on the 2010 national census, Maya Beach has a population of 225 year round residents. The village is home to a number of resorts, boutique hotels, and vacation homes.

The village is often considered a part of the peninsula's largest community and namesake, Placencia, which is a short drive from the village. Maya Beach is served by the Placencia Airport, with the closest international hub being Philip S. W. Goldson International Airport in Belize City.

== Demographics ==
At the time of the 2010 census, Maya Beach had a population of 229. Of these, 39.3% were Caucasian, 35.8% Mestizo, 8.7% Mopan Maya, 7.9% Mixed, 1.7% Asian, 1.7% Ketchi Maya, 1.3% African, 1.3% Creole, 0.4% East Indian, 0.4% Yucatec Maya, 0.4% Mennonite and 0.4% others.

== See also ==
- Geography of Belize
- History of Belize
