= Belize City Airport =

Belize City Airport can refer to:

- Sir Barry Bowen Municipal Airport (formerly Belize City Municipal Airport)
- Philip S. W. Goldson International Airport
