= Caye Chapel Airport =

Airport in Belize

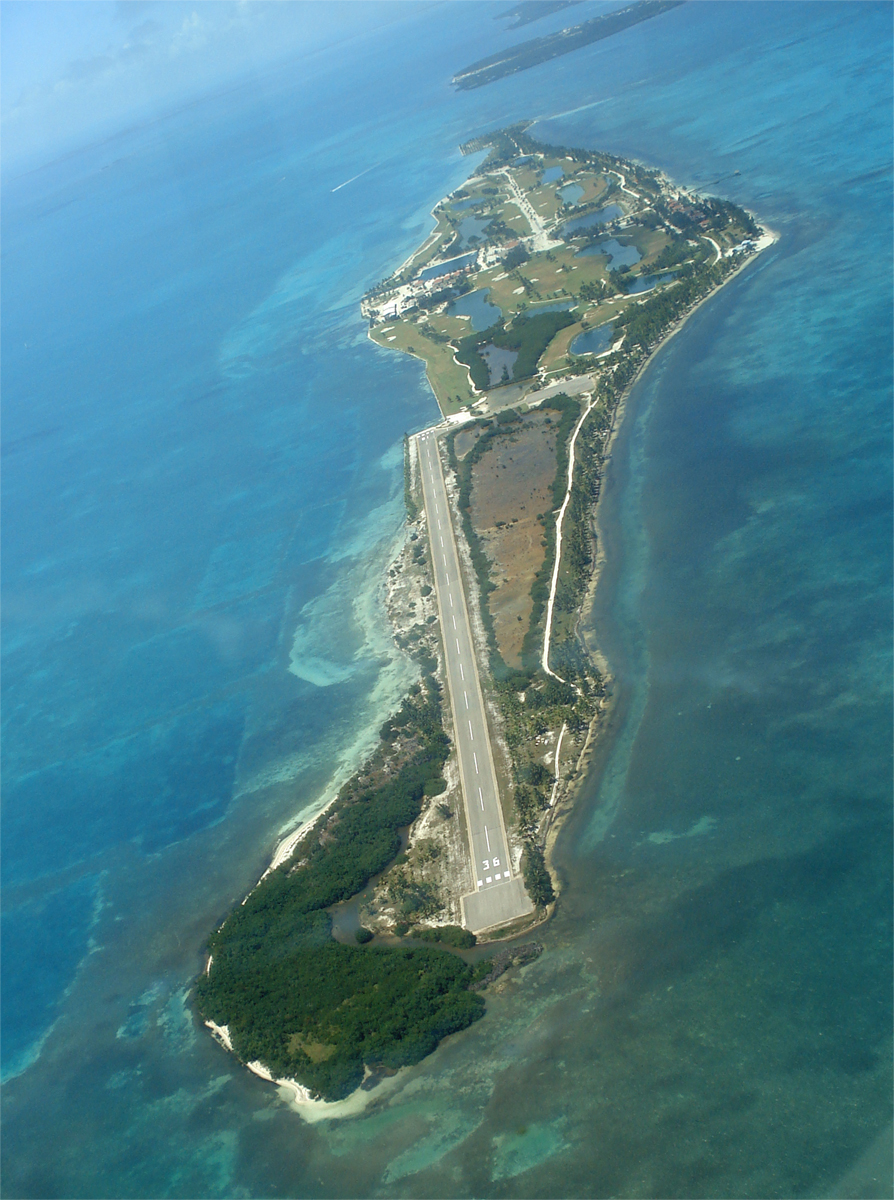
- IATA: CYC; ICAO: MZCP

Summary
- Airport type: Private
- Serves: Caye Chapel
- Elevation AMSL: 3 ft / 1 m
- Coordinates: 17°41′00″N 88°02′40″W

Map
- Location in Belize

Runways
Direction	Length		Surface
Direction	m	ft	Surface
18/36	992	3,255	Asphalt
- Source: GCM

Caye Chapel Airport (IATA: CYC, ICAO: MZCP) is an airport serving Caye Chapel, an island 20 kilometres (12 mi) off the coast of Belize. The runway is at the southern tip of the narrow cay.

== Airlines and destinations ==
Airlines	Destinations
Maya Island Air	Belize City–International, Caye Caulker

== See also ==
- Transport in Belize
- List of airports in Belize
