= CZH =

CZH or czh may refer to:

- CZH, the IATA code for Corozal Airport, Belize
- CZH, the Pinyin code for Chuzhou railway station, Anhui, China
- CZH, the Telegram code for Changzhou railway station, Jiangsu, China
- czh, the ISO 639-3 code for Huizhou Chinese, China
