= Flight 711 =

Flight 711 may refer to:

- American Airlines Flight 711 – crashed near Springfield, Missouri in 1955.
- Tropic Air Flight 711 – hijacked on April 17, 2025.
