= Tropic Air Flight 711 =

2025 aircraft hijacking over Belize

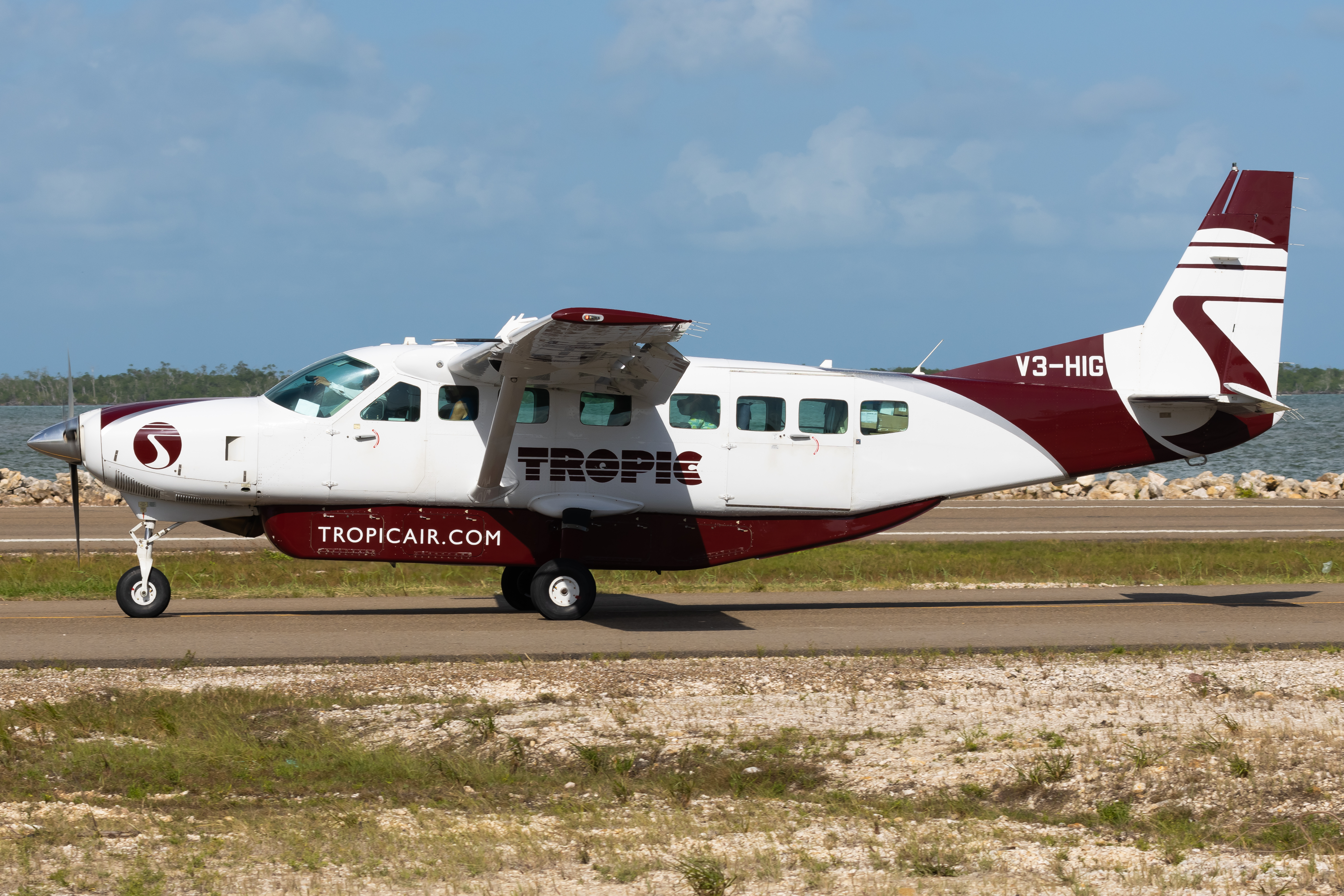
- V3-HIG, the aircraft involved in the hijacking, seen in 2023

Hijacking
- Date: 17 April 2025
- Summary: Hijacking
- Site: over Belize City

Aircraft
- Aircraft type: Cessna 208 Grand Caravan EX
- Operator: Tropic Air
- IATA flight No.: 9N711
- ICAO flight No.: TOS711
- Call sign: TROPISER 711
- Registration: V3-HIG
- Flight origin: Corozal Airport, Belize
- Destination: John Greif II Airport, Belize
- Occupants: 16 (including hijacker)
- Passengers: 14 (including hijacker)
- Crew: 2
- Fatalities: 1 (hijacker)
- Injuries: 3
- Survivors: 15

On 17 April 2025, a Tropic Air Cessna 208 Caravan, operating as Tropic Air Flight 711 was hijacked by a passenger armed with a knife while flying between the Belizean towns of Corozal and San Pedro. The hijacker was shot and killed by an armed passenger after the plane performed an emergency landing at Philip S. W. Goldson International Airport.

== Background ==
=== Aircraft ===
The aircraft involved was a Cessna 208 Grand Caravan EX operated by Belize airline Tropic Air. The aircraft was registered as V3-HIG.

=== Passengers and crew ===
On board the flight there were 14 passengers, including the hijacker, of which two were American nationals and a small child. One of the two pilots of the flight was Captain Howell Grange, who was injured during the hijacking.

== Hijacking ==
The flight was operating as Flight 9N711. At 08:17 CST (UTC−6), the aircraft took off from Corozal Airport headed to John Greif II Airport. Six minutes later, the aircraft began squawking 7700, indicating a general emergency.

The plane made a sharp turn and began to circle over the Belizean coast. While over the Caribbean Sea, the aircraft requested that other aircraft in the area, including a helicopter of Astrum Helicopter Tours, keep track of it.

The aircraft flew over Belize City until it nearly ran out of fuel and landed, at which point the hijacker began stabbing passengers with a knife. Two were injured while others ran to the back of the plane. The plane then landed at Philip S. W. Goldson International Airport in Belize City at around 10:30 am. Upon landing, another passenger with a license to carry a firearm shot the hijacker dead. Both injured victims were taken to a hospital and later recovered. A 49-year-old United States national and military veteran Akinyela Sawa Taylor was identified as the hijacker. Taylor had entered Belize some days before the hijacking, and during this time, he was reported to have attacked a police officer. The hijacking lasted for about an hour and a half. His motive was unknown but he demanded that the pilot take him out of the country. Belize's police commissioner Chester Williams said that Taylor had previously been denied entry to Belize.

The hijacker demanded the crew to fly the plane to Texas, a destination which was not possible to reach given the amount of fuel in the aircraft tanks.

== Reactions ==
U.S. Embassy in Belize public affairs officer Luke Martin said the embassy expressed its regret over the incident. Police commissioner Chester Williams said that it was still unknown how the hijacker managed to smuggle a knife on board, but he cited the lack of security screenings in the country's smaller airports as the probable cause.

Tropic Air said the attempted hijacking was a "serious and unprecedented inflight emergency". The CEO of the airline also described as that the actions of the pilot were "nothing short of heroic", and that they will be offering support to the injured passengers.

== Aftermath ==
Tropic Air announced on April 30 that it will implement stricter security measures, as a result of the hijacking. These measures include personal item and physical searches. On the same day Belizean authorities announced that an investigation on the incident is ongoing, and that a full report will be published.

Captain Grange sued the Belize Airports Authority for their supposed insufficient security measures in the country's airports, that led to the hijacking.
