= Caye Chapel =

Small island in Belize

Coordinates: 17°41′45″N 88°2′33″W

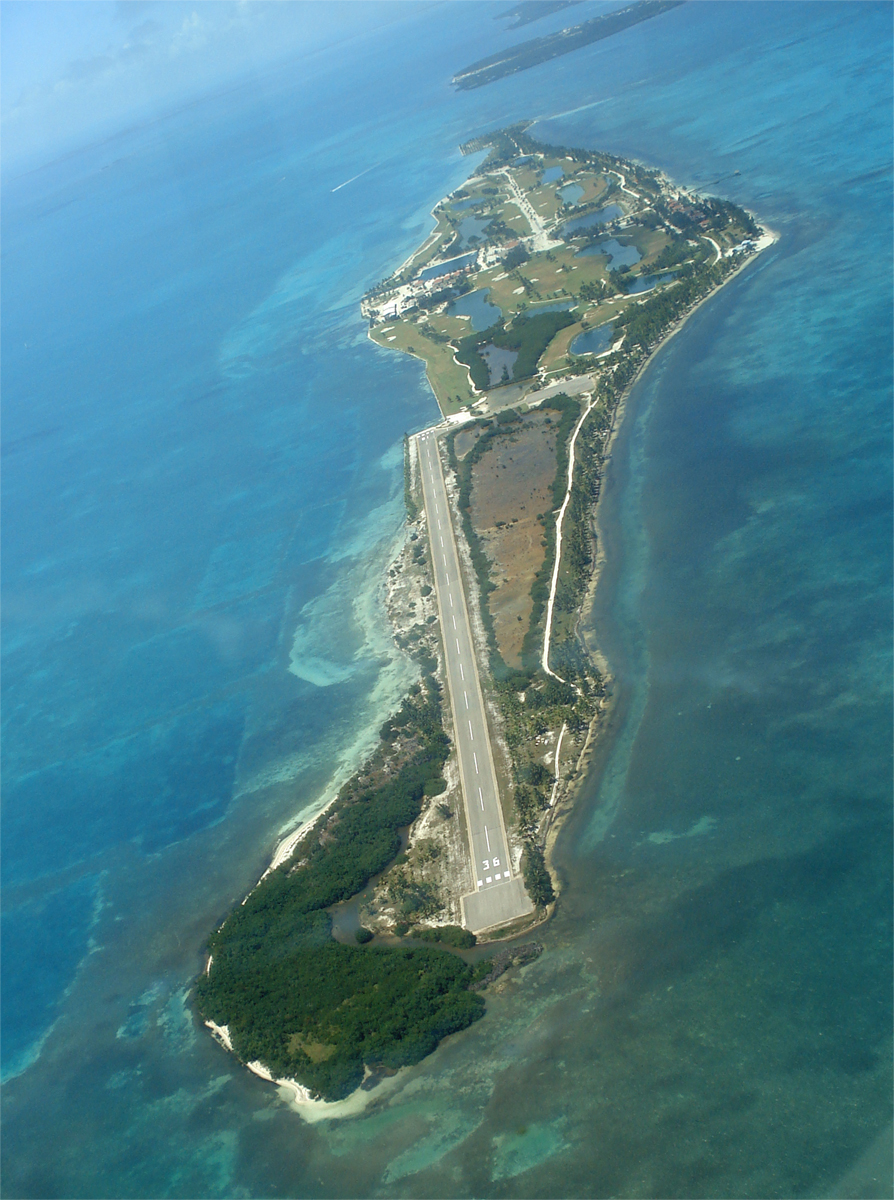
Caye Chapel from the air

Caye Chapel is a small, private island in Belize, 16 miles (26 km) north-northeast of Belize City and 3 miles (4.8 km) south of Caye Caulker. It was once owned by Isaiah Emmanuel Morter, Belize's first African millionaire.

Caye Chapel is adjacent to the Bacalar Chico National Park and Marine Reserve (BCNPMR), a UNESCO World Heritage Site. BCNPMR is part of the Mesoamerican Barrier Reef System, the world's second longest barrier reef, which is home to the Great Blue Hole and other popular SCUBA diving destinations accessible from Caye Chapel.

In comparison to other typically rural cayes and islands in the vicinity, it features an airstrip, 18 hole golf course, 25,000-square-foot (2,300 m^{2}) clubhouse and conference facilities. The golf course, named White Shark Golf Course, was co-designed by former PGA Tour player and World Golf Hall of Fame member Greg Norman, alongside former LPGA Tour player and World Golf Hall of Fame member Lorena Ochoa. The golf course is situated within the middle area of the 280 acre island, with the southernmost point of the golf course situated beside the Caye Chapel airstrip.

Four Seasons Hotels and Resorts, on September 2, 2023, again announced plans for the development of Caye Chapel, but the project has been stalled for many years. It is expected to feature approximately 50 private estate lots, 35 private residences, and 100 guest rooms and suites.

It is possible to snorkel and fish around the island.

== Gallery ==
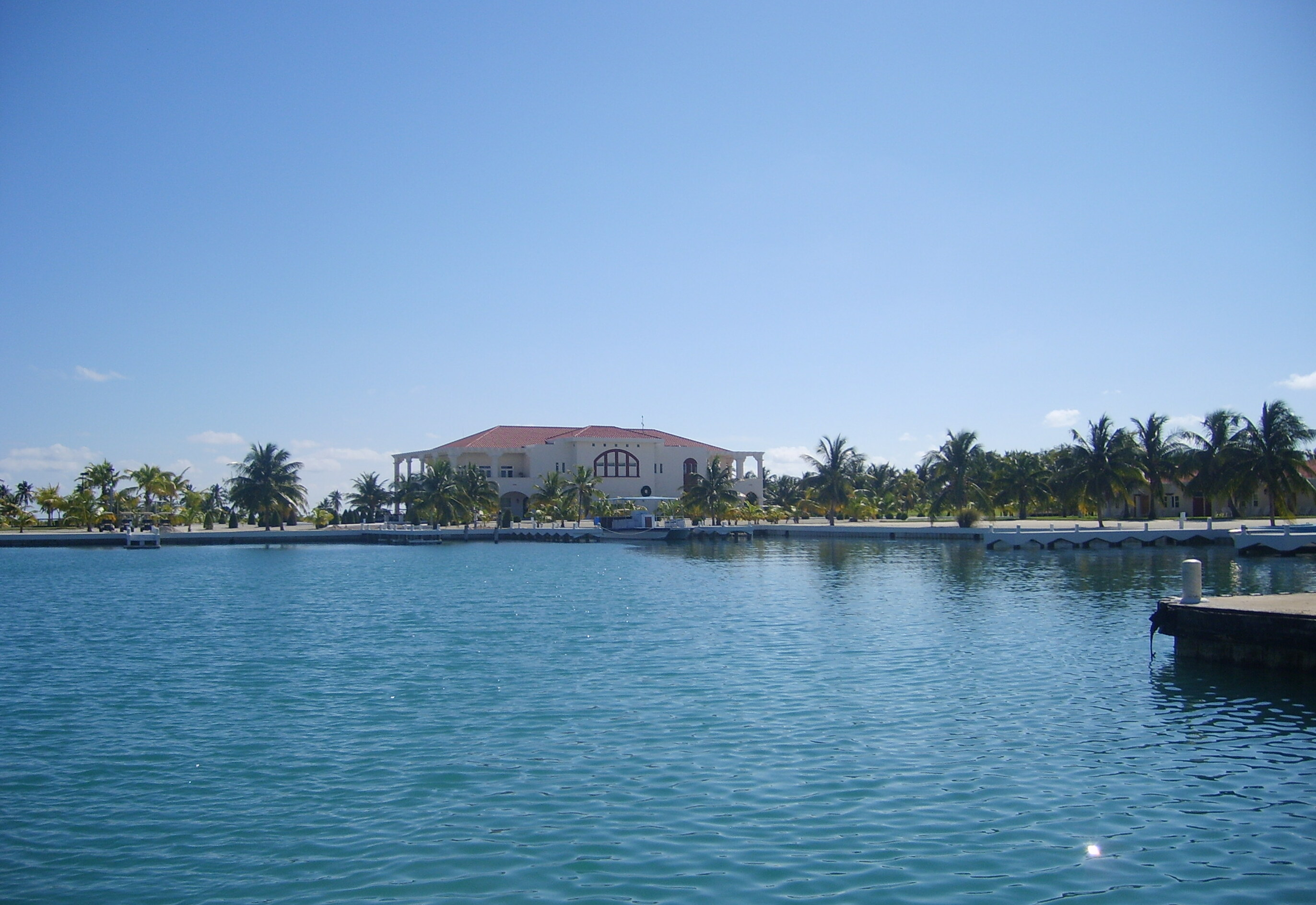
Caye Chapel from a boat
