= Barry Bowen =

Belizean businessman and politician (1945–2010)

Sir Barry Manfield Bowen KCMG (September 19, 1945 – February 26, 2010) was a Belizean bottling magnate and entrepreneur. His business interests included Bowen and Bowen, Ltd, which was founded by his father, and is the exclusive bottler of Coca-Cola products in Belize, as well as the Belize Brewing Company, which brews Belikin Beer. Bowen also served as a former member of the Senate of Belize and the financier of the People's United Party. In December 2007, Queen Elizabeth II knighted Bowen as a Knight Commander of the Order of St Michael and St George.

== Biography ==
Bowen, a seventh generation Belizean, was born to Eric William Manfield Bowen and Emilie Josephine Bowen, in Belize City, British Honduras, on September 19, 1945. Eric Bowen, originally from San Ignacio, Cayo District, founded a lemonade factory called Bowen and Bowen (and also known as the Crystal Bottling Co.) in the 1930s. The company would eventually grow into Belize's largest bottler under his son, Barry.

Barry Bowen attended Cornell University and returned to run Bowen and Bowen with his father. They began distributing Coca-Cola products throughout what was then known as British Honduras. Barry Bowen became the manager of his father's company in 1968. In 1971, the family-owned Bowen and Bowen acquired the Belize Brewing Company, maker of Belikin, which was first brewed in the late 1960s.

== Business career ==
Bowen purchased Bowen and Bowen, Ltd., from his father in 1977. Bowen focused on developing his business into Belize's only maker and distributor of Coca-Cola products in the country. He also sought to turn Belikin, brewed by the Belize Brewing Company, into the most popular beer in Belize. Before Belikin, most Belizeans drank imported Guinness stout or Heineken. Once Bowen began producing the locally brewed Belikin in larger quantities, the People's United Party (PUP) raised taxes on imported beers, which switched most local drinkers to the less costly Belikin. As of 2010, the Bowen family-owned brewing company controls virtually the entire beer market in Belize, as imports of brands from Mexico and Guatemala are prohibited. Belikin is now the country's only domestically produced beer, following the failure of its competitor, Charger beer. The company currently brews several brands of beer - Belikin, Lighthouse lager, Belikin Supreme lager, and Belikin stout, as well as Guinness stout under a licensing agreement.

Bowen had a large number of other business interests, in addition to his Coca-Cola and Belikin operations. He owned the Gallon Jug Estate, a 130,000-acre (530 km^{2}) private nature reserve in Orange Walk District. Within Bowen's Gallon Jug Estate is the Chan Chich Lodge, a world famous Belizean rainforest hotel, and Gallon Jug Agro-Industries, a 3,000-acre (12 km^{2}) organic experimental farm which Bowen established to produce cacao and cattle. The farm is also the only commercial coffee grower in Belize. He also owned Belize Aquaculture Ltd., a shrimp farm located near the village of Placencia, Stann Creek District, and a Ford dealership in Belize City. He also served as the director of Belize Airways, established in 1976, which was the country's first national airline.

Bowen was killed around 5:30 p.m. on February 26, 2010, when the Cessna 206 he was piloting crashed on approach to the airstrip at San Pedro Town, Ambergris Caye. Bowen was 64 years old. The crash also killed Michael Casey, Jill Casey, teachers at Gallon Jug Community School, and their children, Makayla and Bryce, who were from Albany, New York. Bowen was survived by his wife, Lady Bowen, four children, two stepchildren, and several grandchildren.

Sir Barry Bowen was granted a state funeral on March 2, 2010, which was attended by Prime Minister Dean Barrow and his wife, leader of the opposition, Johnny Briceño, former Prime Minister Said Musa, and other dignitaries. The funeral was held at St. John's Cathedral, Belize City. Bowen was buried with his parents in San Ignacio Town, Cayo District.

== Personal life ==
In May 1965, Bowen married Carol Anne Caughey. They had one daughter, Shelley Anne Bowen, and two sons, Kevin Manfield Bowen and Michael Harwell Manfield Bowen; the marriage was dissolved in 2004. His second marriage in 2004 was to Dixie Walker Summerscales, who had two sons, Alexander George Westerhold and Dustin David Westerhold, from a previous marriage, and a daughter with Bowen, Courtney Walker Bowen. The couple had a home in San Pedro, Ambergris Caye, Belize.

Alexander and Dustin, while never adopted by Bowen, legally changed their last name to Bowen after they both turned eighteen.
