= Caye Caulker Airport =

Airport in Belize

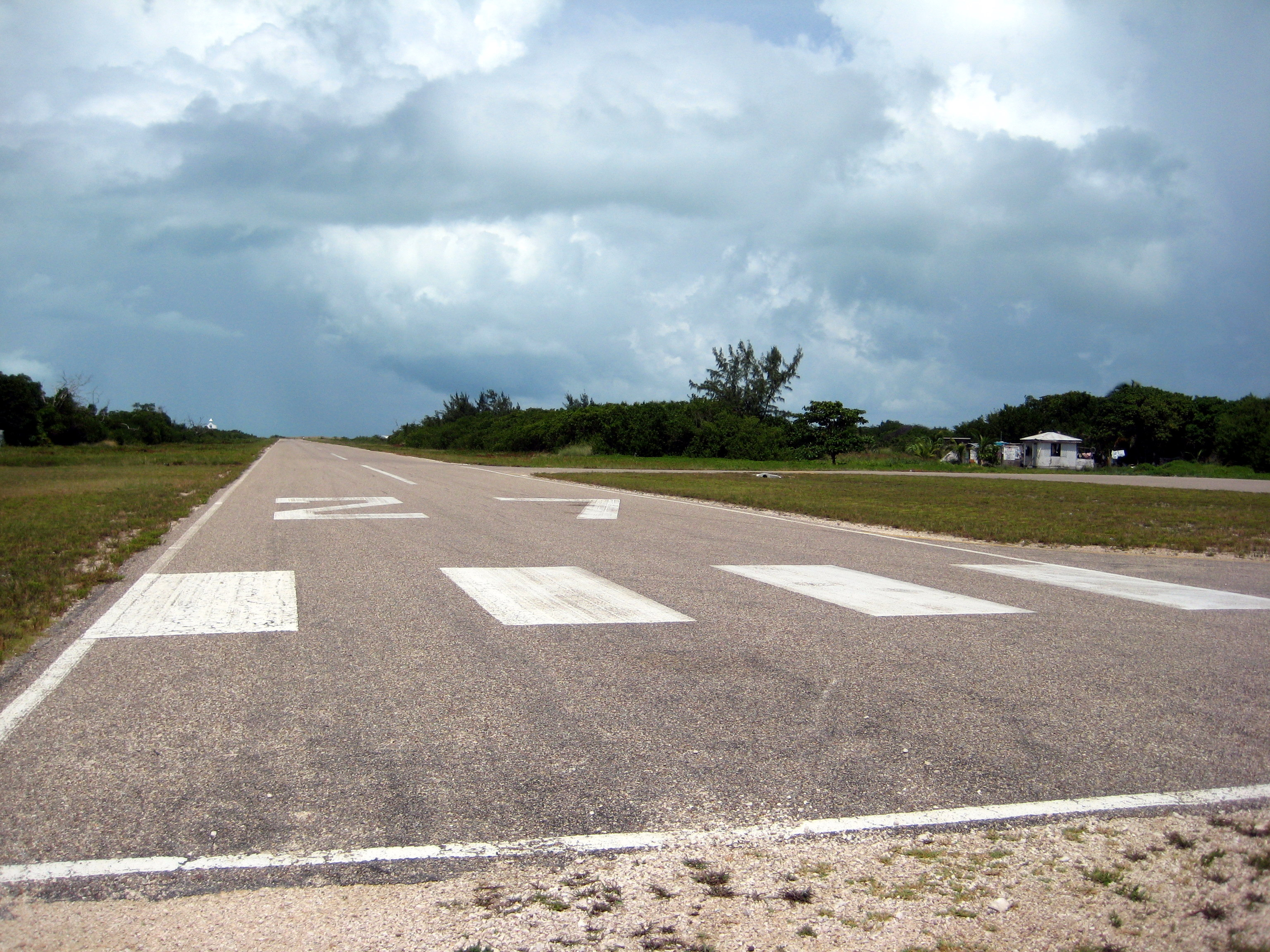
- Eastern edge of Caye Caulker Airport in August 2008.
- IATA: CUK; ICAO: MZCK

Summary
- Airport type: Public
- Serves: Caye Caulker
- Elevation AMSL: 2 ft / 1 m
- Coordinates: 17°44′05″N 88°02′00″W

Map
- Location in Belize

Runways
Direction	Length		Surface
Direction	m	ft	Surface
09/27	866	2,841	Asphalt
- Sources: GCM

Caye Caulker Airport (IATA: CUK, ICAO: MZCK) is an airport that serves the island of Caye Caulker, 20 kilometres (12 mi) off the coast of Belize. After Maya Island Air and Tropic Air suspended service to Caye Caulker in 2017 due to the dangerous condition of the runway, the airport underwent a BZ$3.6 million renovation that included asphalt pavement and runway lighting.

== Airlines and destinations ==
Airlines	Destinations
Maya Island Air	Belize City–International, Belize City–Municipal, San Pedro
Tropic Air	Belize City–International, Belize City–Municipal, San Pedro

== See also ==
- Transport in Belize
- List of airports in Belize
