= Transportes Aéreos Nacionales =

Honduran airline

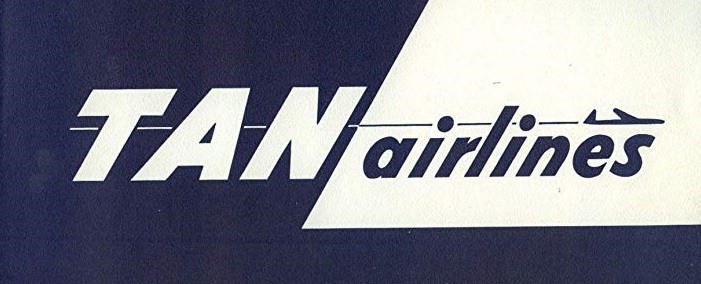
IATA	ICAO	Call sign
TX	TAN	—
- Founded: 1947
- Ceased operations: 1 November 1991 (merged with Sahsa)
- Headquarters: Tegucigalpa, Honduras

Transportes Aéreos Nacionales SA, also known as TAN Airlines, was a Honduran airline, headquartered at the Edificio TAN in Tegucigalpa. The carrier was set up in 1947 and merged into SAHSA, another Honduran airline, in November 1991.

== History ==
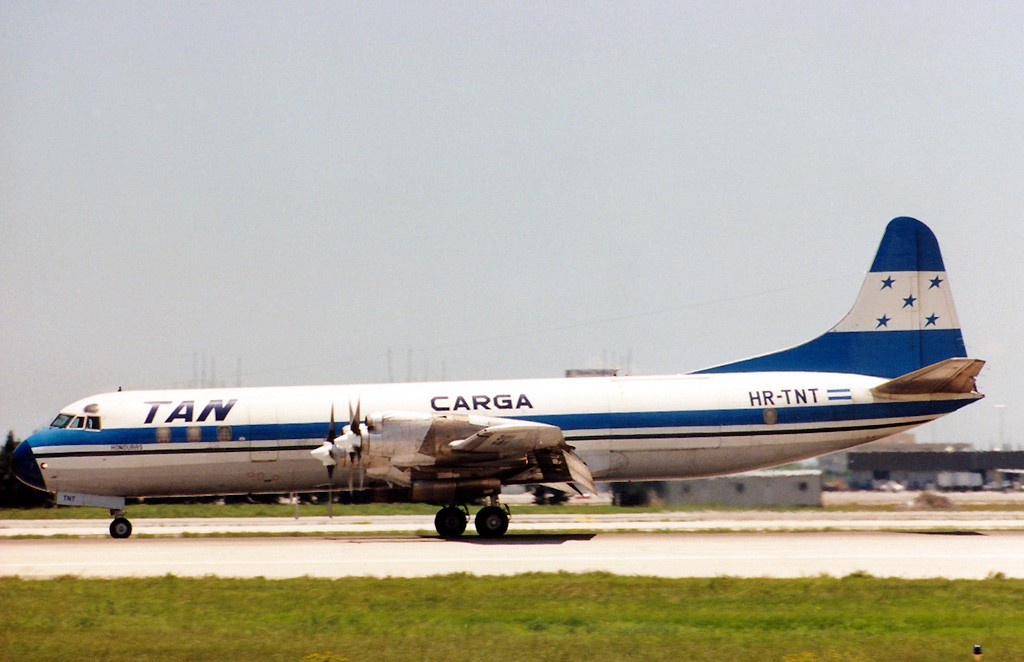
A Transportes Aéreos Nacionales Lockheed L-188AF Electra at Miami International Airport in 1989.

The airline was formed in 1947 by private investors to operate cargo flights by contract. In 1950, the company started scheduled passenger and cargo services. At March 1960, the fleet consisted of three C-46s serving a route network that was 1,180 miles (1,900 km) long. In 1967, TAN and LANICA agreed to operate LANICA's single BAC One-Eleven 400 jet on a joint basis; the joint operation of the aircraft started on 19 October 1967.

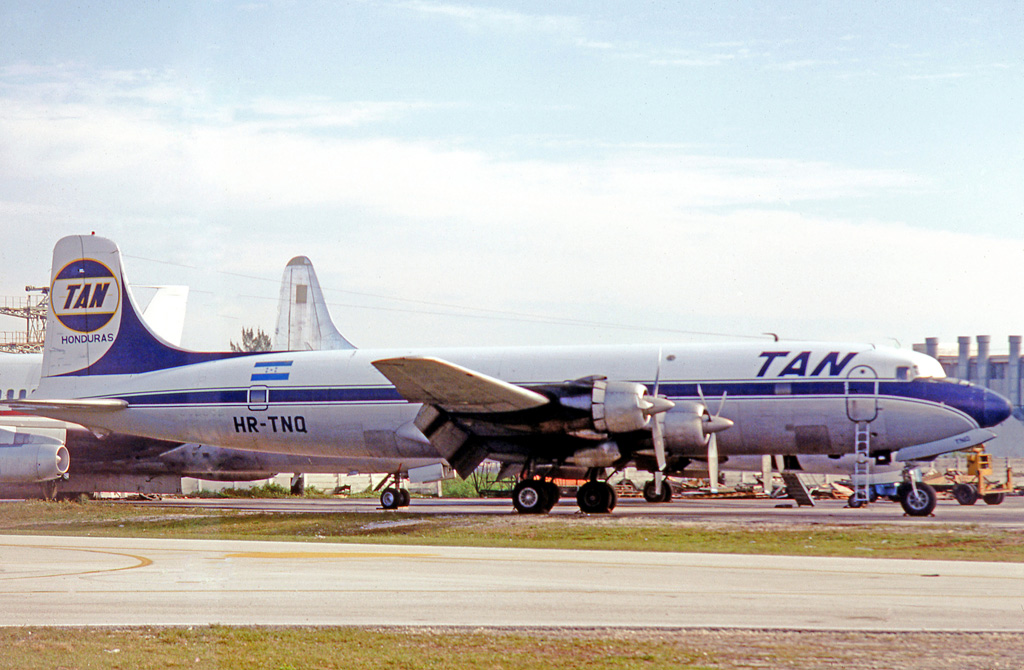
TAN Airlines Douglas DC-6A freighter at Miami Airport in 1978.

The airline acquired a Douglas DC-6A freighter aircraft in March 1973 and operated it until its sale in September 1979, using it particularly on their route to Miami.

In February 1970, TAN acquired Pan Am's 38% holding in SAHSA. According to the Official Airline Guide (OAG), TAN was operating a Convair 880 jet in 1972 on flights to Miami. An ex-Pluna Boeing 737-200 jet was incorporated into the fleet in May 1974. The aircraft was part of the fleet by March 1975, along with one DC-6B and two Lockheed L-188 Electra turboprops; at this time, the airline had 400 employees. According to the OAG, in 1980 TAN was serving Miami nonstop from Belize City and San Pedro Sula as well as operating direct flights to Miami from La Ceiba and Tegucigalpa primarily with the Boeing 737-200 with some passenger flights being operated with the Lockheed L-188 Electra.

In October 1989, the company experienced its worst accident when a Boeing 727-200 crashed on approach to Toncontín Airport, killing 131 occupants on board.

On 1 November 1991, TAN Airlines merged with SAHSA, adopting the latter name.

== Destinations ==
Transportes Aéreos Nacionales served the following destinations all through its history:

Belize

- Belize City – Philip S. W. Goldson International Airport

Honduras

- La Ceiba – Golosón International Airport
- San Pedro Sula – Ramón Villeda Morales International Airport
- Tegucigalpa – Toncontín International Airport

Mexico

- Mexico D.F. – Mexico City International Airport

United States

- Miami – Miami International Airport

== Accidents and incidents ==
As of March 2012, Aviation Safety Network recorded six accidents or incidents for Transportes Aéreos Nacionales, totalling at least 138 fatalities. The worst accident in the airline's history occurred in October 1989, when a Boeing 727 crashed on approach to Toncontín Airport in Tegucigalpa, killing 131 of 146 occupants of the aircraft. As of September 2013, the accident remains the deadliest one to occur on Honduran soil. Following is a list of accidents/incidents experienced by the carrier; the list includes events in which there were fatalities, the aircraft involved resulted damaged beyond repair, or both.

Date	Location	Aircraft	Tail number	Aircraft damage	Fatalities	Description	Refs
27 August 1948	Unknown	Douglas C-47-DL	TI-107	W/O	Unknown	Disappeared.	
6 January 1962	Belize City	Curtiss C-46A	HR-TNB	W/O	1/2	Failed to gain height following takeoff from Philip S. W. Goldson International Airport because of overloading.	
30 June 1966	Tegucigalpa	Douglas DC-6	HR-TNG	W/O	0/3	Skidded off the runway on landing at Toncontín Airport.	
27 January 1973	Off Tegucigalpa	Douglas DC-6A	HR-TNO	W/O	3/3	The aircraft was completing a Miami–Tegucigalpa cargo service when it crashed 16 kilometres (9.9 mi) north of Tegucigalpa, on approach to Tocontín Airport, catching fire.	
21 October 1989	Tegucigalpa	Boeing 727-200	N88705	W/O	131/146	Descended below the glideslope on approach to Toncontín Airport, crashing into a hill, 4.8 nautical miles (8.9 km; 5.5 mi) from the runway threshold. The aircraft had been leased from Continental Air Lines, and was completing the last leg of an international scheduled San José–Managua–Tegucigalpa passenger service as Flight 414.	
21 March 1990	Tegucigalpa	L-188CF	HR-TNL	W/O	3/3	Crashed into mountainous terrain on approach to Toncontín Airport in bad weather. The aircraft was completing a San Pedro Sula–Tegucigalpa cargo service.	

== See also ==
- Transport in Honduras

== Bibliography ==
- Schleit P., Shelton's barefoot airlines, Fishergate Publishing Co. Inc., Annapolis (Maryland), 1982
- Davies R.E.G., Rebels and reformers of the airways, Airlife Publishing Ltd. & Smithsonian Institution Press, 1987
