= Seine Bight =

Village in belize

Coordinates: 16°34′N 88°22′W

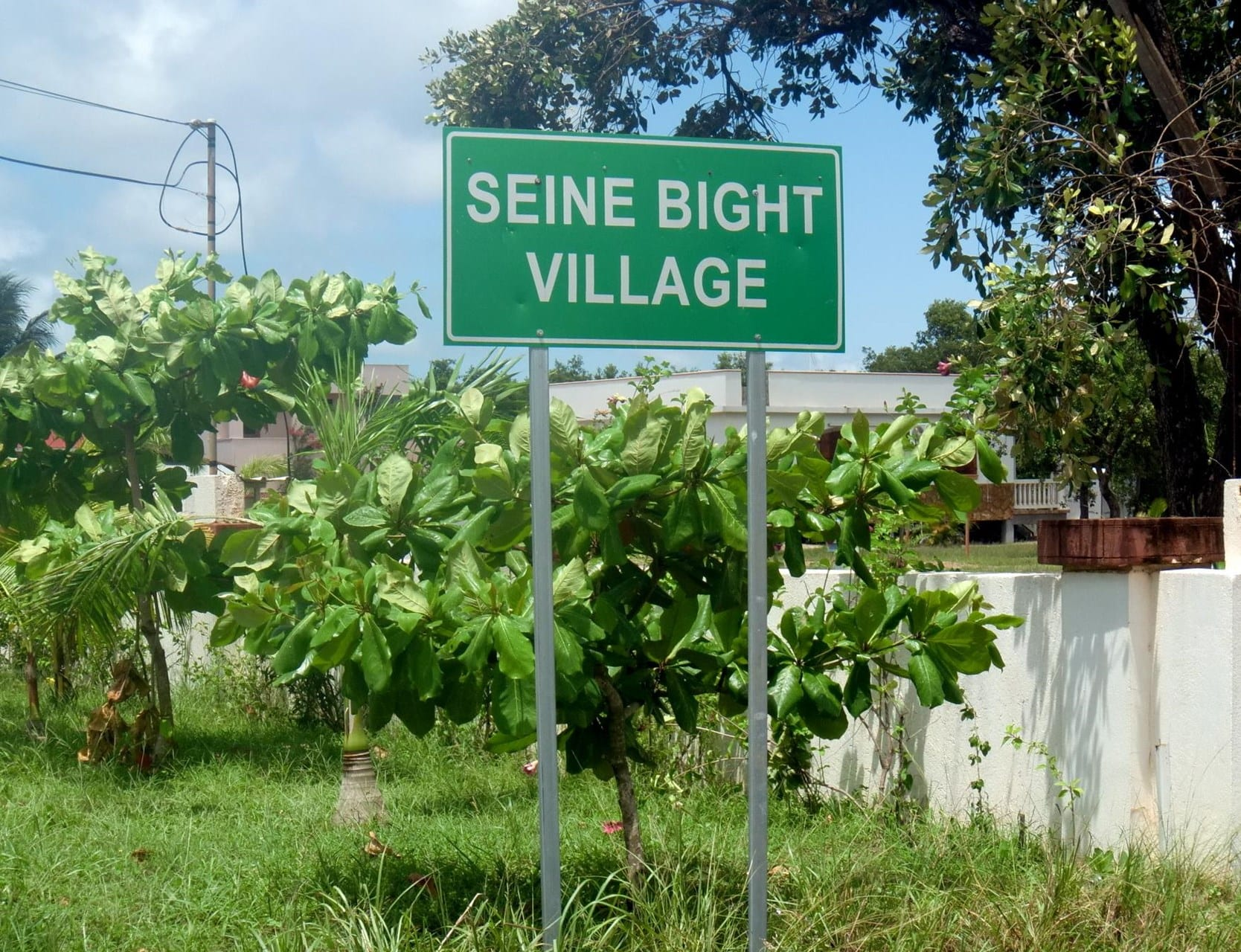

Seine Bight is a village on the Placencia Peninsula located in the Stann Creek District of Belize. It is located 2 1/2 miles (4 km) south of Maya Beach Village and North of the village of Placencia. This small village has roughly 1,000 inhabitants, mostly Garifuna people who subsist on fishing, hunting, and homegrown vegetables. The early settlers named their village for their favored fishing tackle, Seine fishing and a bight, a bend or curve in a coastline.

== Demographics ==
At the time of the 2010 census, Seine Bight had a population of 1,310. Of these, 71.2% were Garifuna, 15.0% Mestizo, 4.4% Creole, 2.8% Mixed, 2.3% Ketchi Maya, 1.8% Caucasian, 1.5% Mopan Maya, 0.5% East Indian and 0.5% Asian.
