= Punta Gorda Airport (Belize) =

Airport in Belize

- IATA: PND; ICAO: MZPG

Summary
- Airport type: Public
- Serves: Punta Gorda, Belize
- Elevation AMSL: 7 ft / 2 m
- Coordinates: 16°06′08″N 88°48′30″W

Map
- Location of airport in Belize

Runways
Direction	Length		Surface
Direction	m	ft	Surface
07/25	723	2,372	Asphalt
- Source: GCM

Punta Gorda Airport (IATA: PND, ICAO: MZPG) is an airport serving Punta Gorda, a town on Amatique Bay in the Toledo District of southern Belize. The airport is within the town, and less than a kilometer from the bay.

== Facilities ==
The airport has one asphalt runway that is 723 metres (2,372 ft) long. Northeast approach and departure are over the water.

== Airlines and destinations ==
The following airlines offer scheduled passenger service:

Airlines	Destinations
Maya Island Air	Placencia
Tropic Air	Belize City–International, Placencia

== See also ==
- Transport in Belize
- List of airports in Belize
