= Placencia Airport =

Airport in Belize

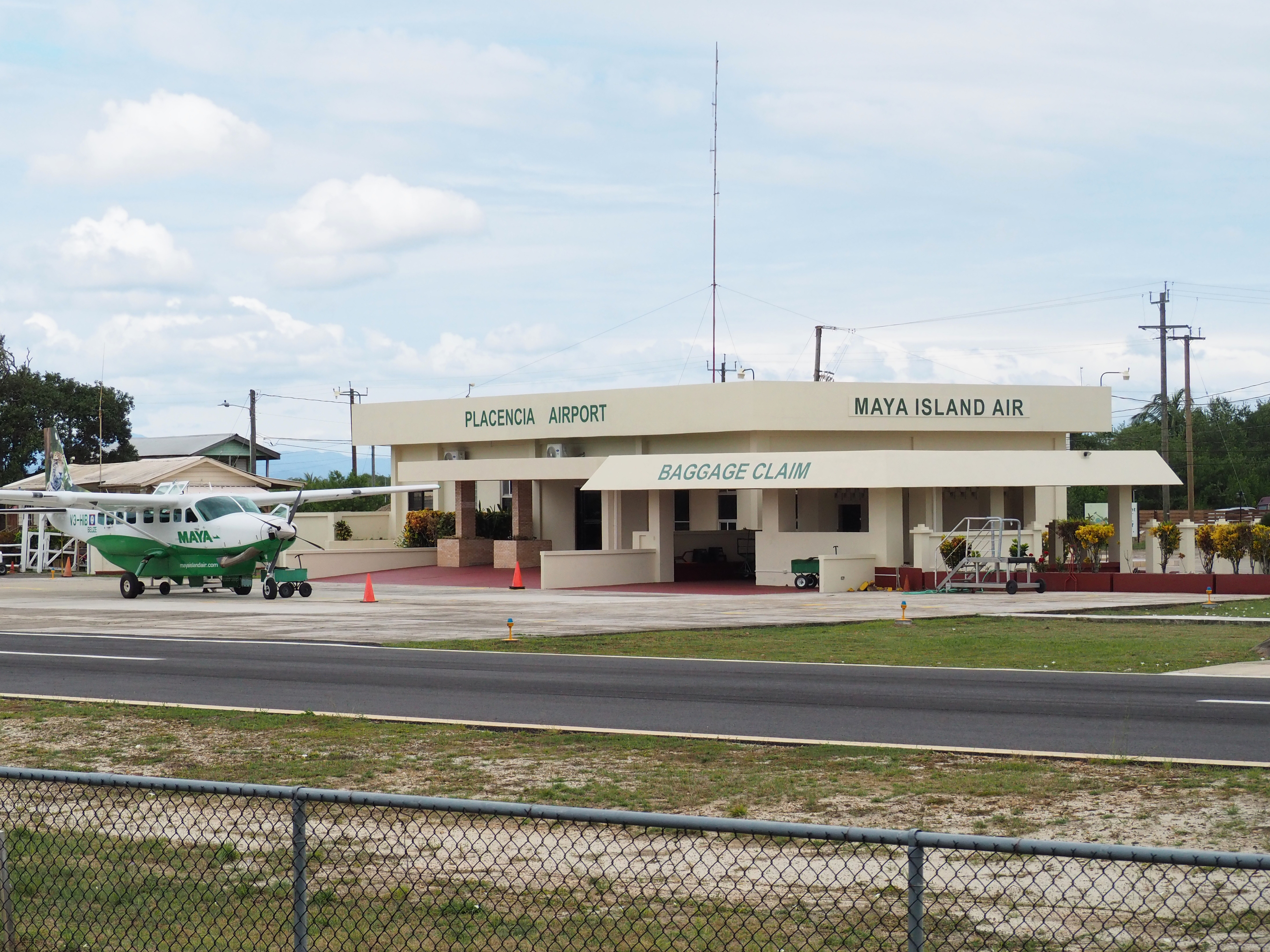
- A Maya Island Air Cessna Caravan at Placencia Airport
- IATA: PLJ; ICAO: MZPL

Summary
- Airport type: Public
- Serves: Placencia
- Elevation AMSL: 3 ft / 1 m
- Coordinates: 16°32′14″N 88°21′40″W

Map
- Location in Belize

Runways
Direction	Length		Surface
Direction	m	ft	Surface
08/26	650	2,133	Asphalt
- Sources: GCM Google Maps

Placencia Airport (IATA: PLJ, ICAO: MZPL) is an airport that serves Placencia, Belize. It has a paved strip and crosses the peninsula from East to West.

As of December 2012, the runway is paved in good condition. Due to the typical sea breeze, takeoffs and landings are typically done east-bound. Private flights are allowed. Parking should be coordinated with Tropic Air or Maya Island Air. The airport has no security.

Common traffic advisory frequency (CTAF) is 122.8 MHz.

== Airlines and destinations ==
Airlines	Destinations
Maya Island Air	Belize City–International, Belize City–Municipal, Dangriga, Punta Gorda
Tropic Air	Belize City–International, Belize City–Municipal, Dangriga, Punta Gorda

== Accidents and incidents ==
- 17 November 2017 - A Cessna 208B Grand Caravan of Tropic Air struck a vehicle shortly after take-off for Punta Gorda Airport and subsequently ditched in the sea. All seven people on board, including the Acting Prime Minister of Belize Patrick Faber and Agriculture Minister Godwin Hulse, survived.

== See also ==
- Transport in Belize
- List of airports in Belize
