= John Greif II Airport =

Airport in Belize

John Greif II Airport San Pedro Airport
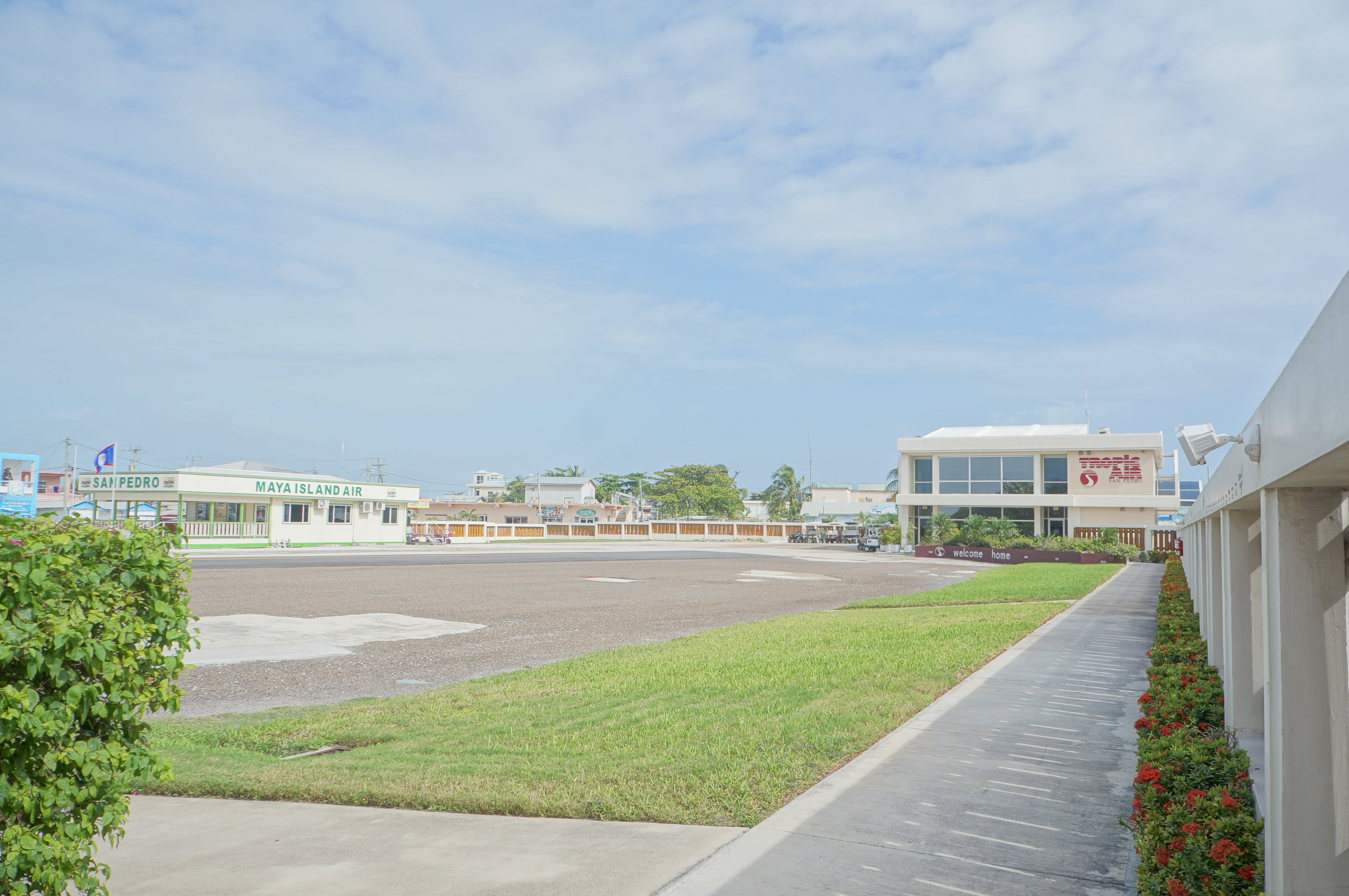
- IATA: SPR; ICAO: MZSP; LID: BZ-MZ10

Summary
- Airport type: Public
- Serves: San Pedro, Belize
- Hub for: Tropic Air
- Elevation AMSL: 4 ft (1.2 m)
- Coordinates: 17°54′50″N 87°58′16″W

Map
- Location in Belize

Runways
Direction	Length		Surface
Direction	m	ft	Surface
06/24	1,067	3,501	Asphalt
- Source: DAFIF GCM

John Greif II Airport (IATA: SPR, ICAO: MZSP) is an airport that serves San Pedro and Ambergris Caye, Belize. It was renamed from San Pedro Airport to John Greif II Airport in 2010.

== Airlines and destinations ==
Airlines	Destinations
Tropic Air	Belize City–International, Belize City–Municipal, Caye Caulker, Corozal

== Accidents ==
- On April 1, 1991, a Cessna 402B operated by Tropic Air crashed into the sea while making a go around on approach to the airport. All 8 occupants were killed, making this the deadliest aviation accident in Belize.
- On February 26, 2010, a Cessna 206 piloted by Barry Bowen crashed on approach to the airstrip. The crash also killed Michael Casey, Jill Casey, teachers at Gallon Jug Community School, and their children, Makayla and Bryce, who were from Albany, New York.

== See also ==
- Transport in Belize
- List of airports in Belize
