= Caye Caulker =

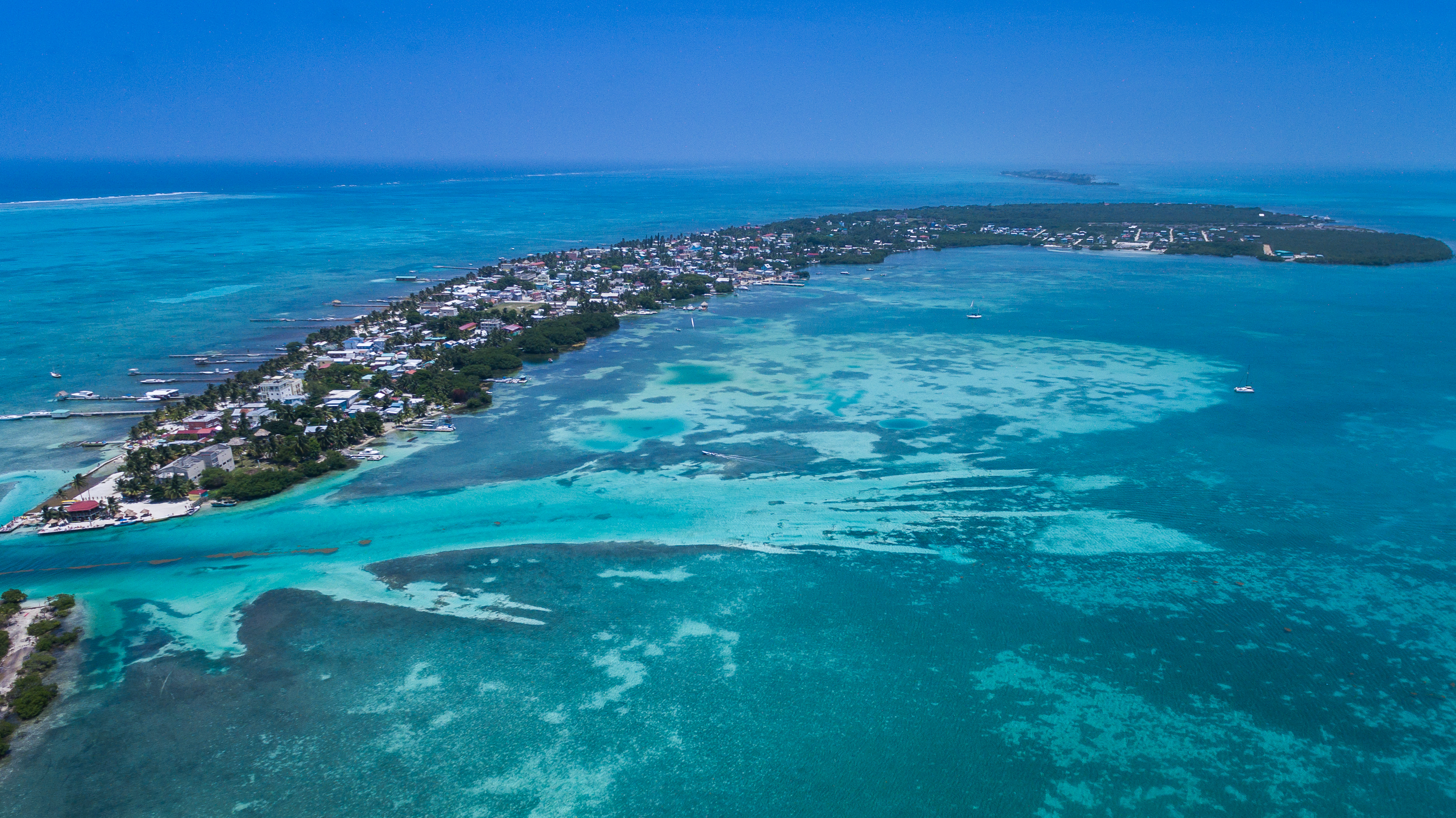
- Aerial view of Caye Caulker

- Location within Belize
- Coordinates: 17°44′33″N 88°01′30″W
- Country: Belize
- District: Belize District

Area
  - Total: 3.823 km^{2} (1.476 sq mi)

Population (2022)
  - Total: 2,729
  - Density: 713.8/km^{2} (1,849/sq mi)
- Demonym: Hicaqueño(a)
- Time zone: UTC-6 (Central)

Caye Caulker (Spanish: Cayo Caulker) is a small limestone coral island off the coast of Belize in the Caribbean Sea measuring about 5 miles (8.0 km) (north to south) by less than 1 mile (1.6 km) (east to west). The town on the island is known by the name Caye Caulker Village. The population of Caye Caulker is approximately 4,000 people.

Caye Caulker is located approximately 20 miles (32 km) north-northeast of Belize City, and is accessible by high-speed water taxi or small plane via Caye Caulker Airport. In recent years, the island has become a popular destination for backpackers and other tourists. There are over 50 hotels and a number of restaurants and shops.

== Geography ==
The island is made up of a sand bar over a limestone shelf. An underwater cave named Giant Cave is found below the Caye in the limestone. In front of the village, a shallow lagoon, between 6 inches (150 mm) and 14 feet (4.3 m) deep, meets the Belize Barrier Reef to the east. This reef is known as a dry reef with the reef exposed at the surface, while further north the reef is a deep reef and lies under 2 to 8 feet (0.61 to 2.44 m) of water. The area is popular with windsurfers.

A narrow waterway known as the Split divides the island in two. Some people state that the Split was created by Hurricane Hattie in 1961 which devastated Belize City; however, this is largely untrue. Villagers who actually hand dredged it maintain that it is largely a man-made feature. The Village Council Chairman at the time, Ramon Reyes, recounts that he and others dredged the waterway by hand after Hurricane Hattie opened a passage a few inches deep. This made a practical water way between the west and east sides of the island, intended at first for dugout canoes. The increased flow of tidal water has dredged the opening to 100 feet (30 m) deep, fortuitously now allowing passage for larger boats. The natural erosion of the soft sand banks of the waterway continues to this day and threatens to further widen the passage.

== Demographics ==
At the time of the 2010 census, Caye Caulker had a population of 1,763. Of these, 65.6% were Mestizo, 15.3% Creole, 4.3% Caucasian, 3.6% Ketchi Maya, 2.9% Garifuna, 2.4% Mopan Maya, 2.3% Mixed, 1.4% Asian, 0.7% East Indian, 0.6% African, 0.3% Mennonite, 0.1% Yucatec Maya and 0.3% others.

== History ==
=== Settlement ===
Caye Caulker is thought to have been inhabited for hundreds of years; however, the recent population levels did not start until the Caste War of Yucatan in 1847, when many mestizos of mixed Maya and Spanish descent fled the massacres taking place across the Yucatán.

The area of the village was granted to Luciano Reyes by Queen Victoria around 1870. Lots were sold to six or seven families, most of which still have descendants on the island today. The influence of these families is still very apparent.

The location of the main settlement on the island is thought to have remained unchanged for hundreds of years. The bay at the back of the village provides shelter for boats while the reef at the front provides good protection from large waves. The coral sand near the village provides adequate anchorage compared to the soft mud found elsewhere on the island.

=== Hurricane Hattie ===
When Hurricane Hattie struck the island in 1961, a storm surge swept across the narrow part of the village. The wooden schoolhouse, being used as a shelter at the time, was destroyed by waves, killing 13, mostly children. The eye of the storm passed to the south of the island, sparing it from further destruction.

The village council was supported in the task of rebuilding by Governor Thornley's Emergency Committee and formed teams to do various types of work. About 42 houses were built in a few weeks. The British Army also helped, with helicopters bringing medical and food supplies. Caye Caulker remains vulnerable to direct hits from hurricanes because it has no defenses from storm surges.

In modern times, there have been at least four major hurricanes which have devastated the island, the most recent of which was Hurricane Keith in 2000. Since the island is only 8 feet (2.4 m) at its highest point, a strong storm surge can easily cover the entire island, as occurred during Hattie and Keith.

Geomorphologically, this vulnerability is heightened by the island's low-relief carbonate sand substrate overlying the underlying karst platform, leaving its littoral zones highly susceptible to rapid coastal reshaping during major tropical cyclones.
