= Belize Airways =

Belize Airways Limited
IATA	ICAO	Call sign
HB	BAL	-
- Founded: June 1976
- Commenced operations: October 1, 1977
- Ceased operations: January 11, 1980
- Hubs: Belize International Airport
- Fleet size: 6
- Destinations: 5
- Headquarters: Belize City, Belize

Belize Airways Limited was Belize's first and only national airline. The carrier began flights from Belize International Airport on October 1, 1977. The airline declared bankruptcy, and its final flight was flown on January 11, 1980.

== Destinations ==
Belize Airways offered scheduled passenger flights between Belize City and Miami, San Pedro Sula, San Salvador and La Ceiba at various times during its existence.

United States

- Miami – Miami International Airport

Honduras

- La Ceiba - Golosón International Airport
- San Pedro Sula - Ramón Villeda Morales International Airport

El Salvador

- San Salvador - Ilopango International Airport

== Aircraft ==
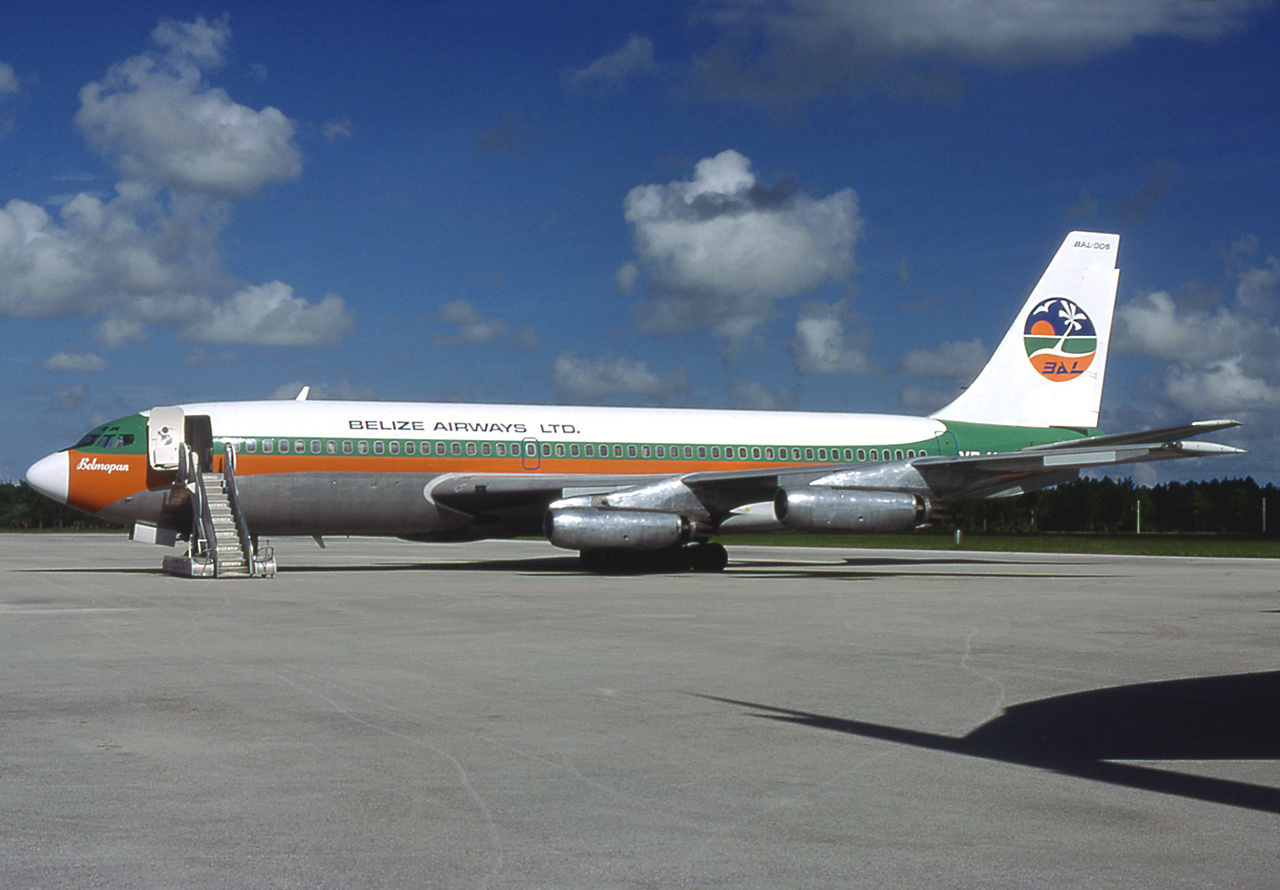
Belize Airways Boeing 720 parked at Miami Executive Airport in 1976

According to Belize Airways timetables, the airline operated Boeing 720 and stretched BAC One-Eleven series 500 jetliners at various times during its existence.

== See also ==
- List of defunct airlines of Belize
