= Maya Island Air =

Belizean airline

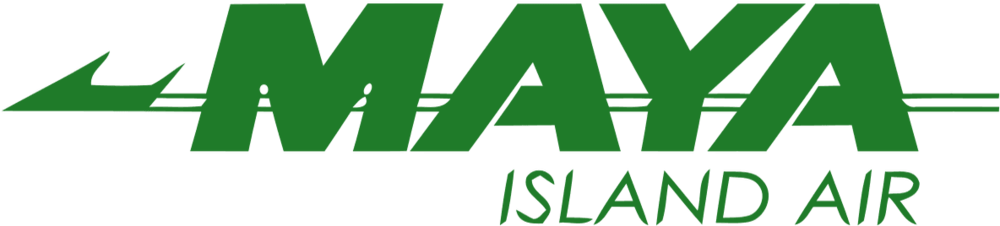
| IATA | ICAO | Call sign |
|---|---|---|
| 2M | MYD | MYLAND |
- Founded: 1997
- Hubs: Philip S. W. Goldson International Airport
- Fleet size: 12
- Destinations: 12
- Headquarters: Belize City, Belize
- Key people: Eugene Zabaneh (Chairman) Zabaneh Family (Owners)
- Website: http://www.mayaislandair.com/

Maya Island Air (also known as Maya Airways) is an airline with its head office on the second floor of Building #1 of Belize City Municipal Airport in Belize City, Belize. It operates regular scheduled flights to 11 destinations within Belize and chartered flights to Mexico, Guatemala, and Honduras. Its main base is the Philip S. W. Goldson International Airport.

== History ==
The airline was formed and started operations in 1962 as Maya Airways. It was established to succeed the government-owned British Honduras Airways, a BWIA subsidiary, which had ceased operations in 1961. In December 1997 Maya Airways and Island Air merged to form Maya Island Air. In November 2007 all airlines from Belize lost their permission to land in Guatemala due to Guatemala's upgrade to category 1. Later on, Maya Island Air flew to Guatemala again. From July 8, 2009, to May 2011, it also flew Belize City-Cancun.

== Destinations ==
Maya Island Air operates the following services (at November 2018):

- Belize
  - Belize City (Philip S. W. Goldson International Airport and Belize City Municipal Airport)
  - Caye Caulker
  - Caye Chapel
  - Corozal
  - Dangriga
  - Placencia
  - Punta Gorda
  - San Pedro Town
  - Savannah Station (Stann Creek District)

== Fleet ==
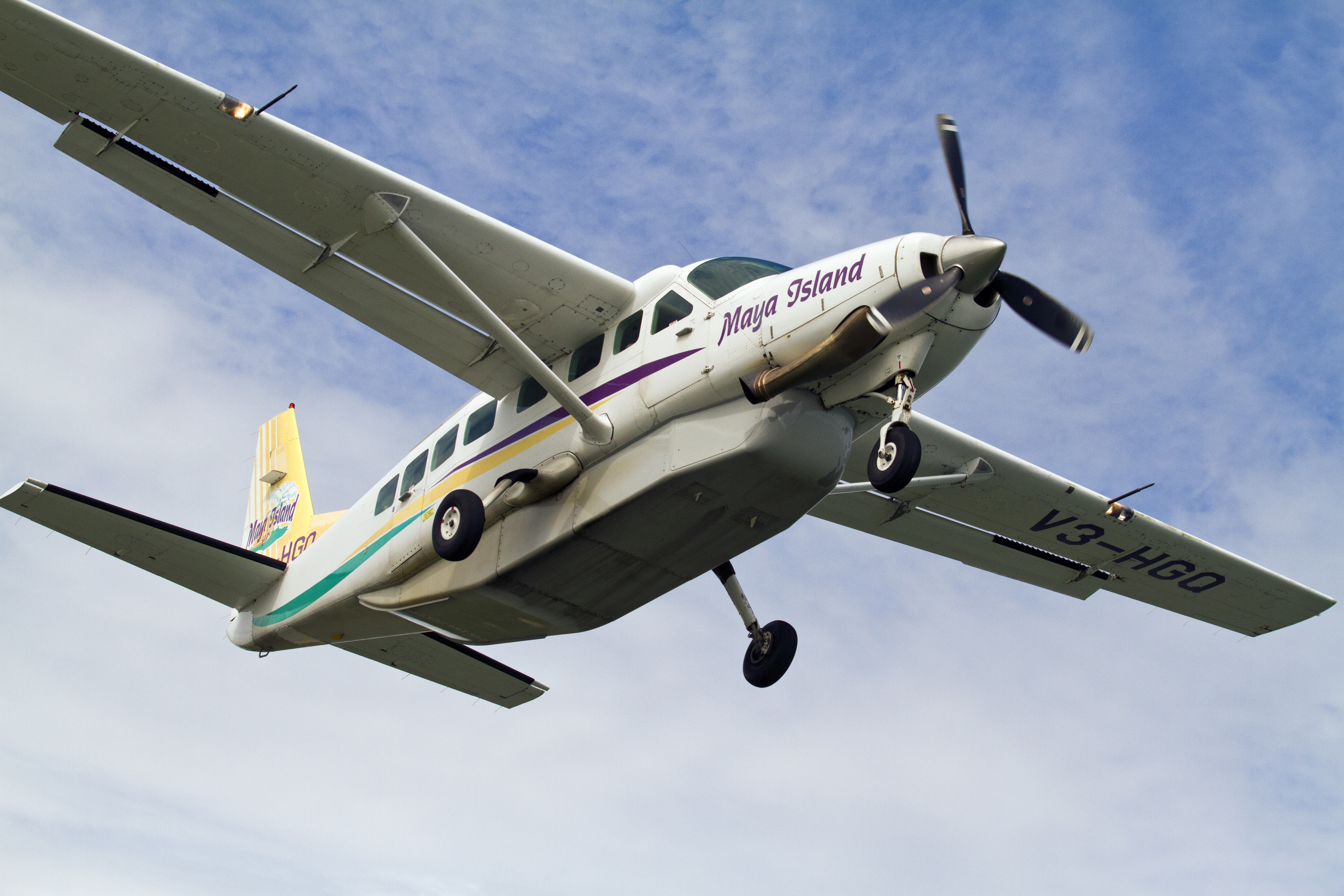
A Cessna 208 of Maya Island Air (2014)

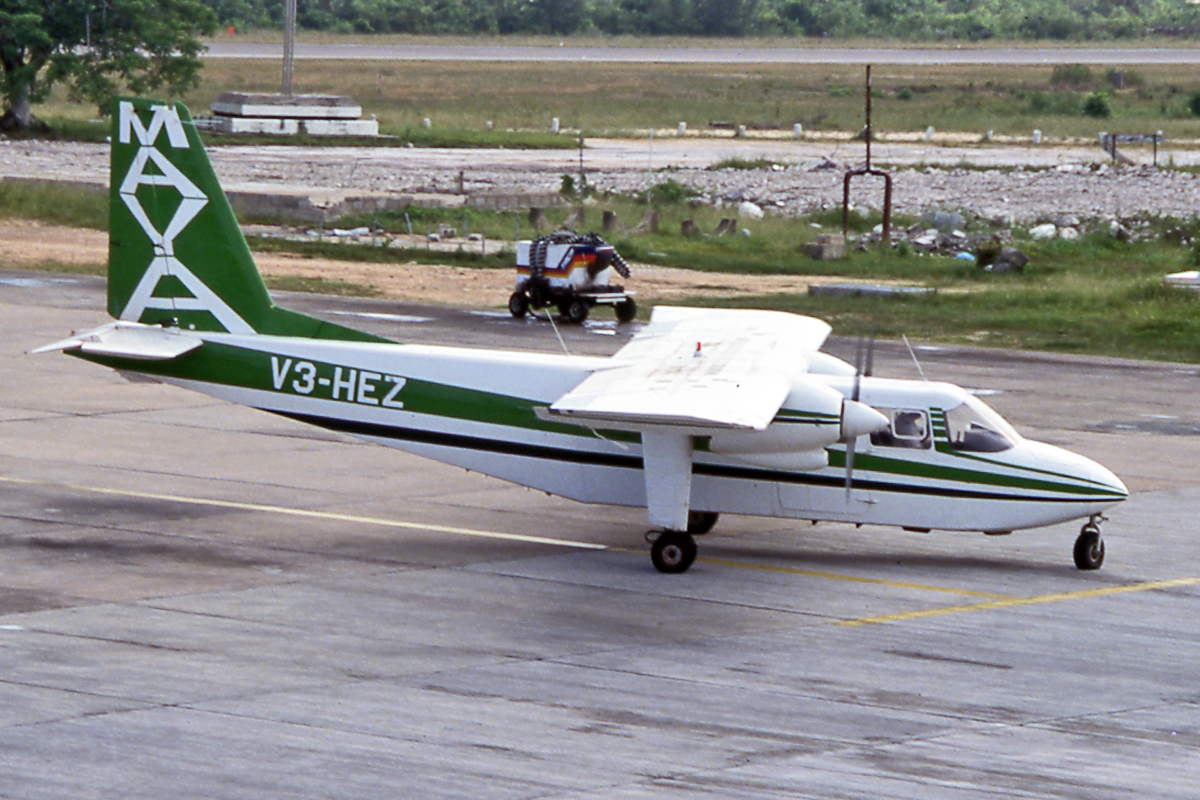
A Britten-Norman BN-2 Islander of Maya Island Air in 1991.

The Maya Island Air fleet consists of the following aircraft (as of 14 September 2020):

- 3 Britten-Norman BN2A Islander
- 1 Cessna 182S
- 8 Cessna 208B Caravan
- 1 Gippsland GA-8 Airvan

== Accidents and incidents ==
- December 4, 2007, a Maya Island Air Cessna 208B Caravan V3-HFS was taking off from Corozal Airport for a flight to San Pedro Airport, when the pilots aborted takeoff but were not able to stop the airplane on the remaining runway. The Grand Caravan struck a barbed wire fence and ran into several orange trees before coming to a halt some 520 feet beyond the runway. The undercarriage was sheared off and the airplane sustained substantial damage to the belly. None of the 12 passengers and crew were killed or injured in the accident.
