= Placencia =

Village in Stann Creek, Belize

- Village
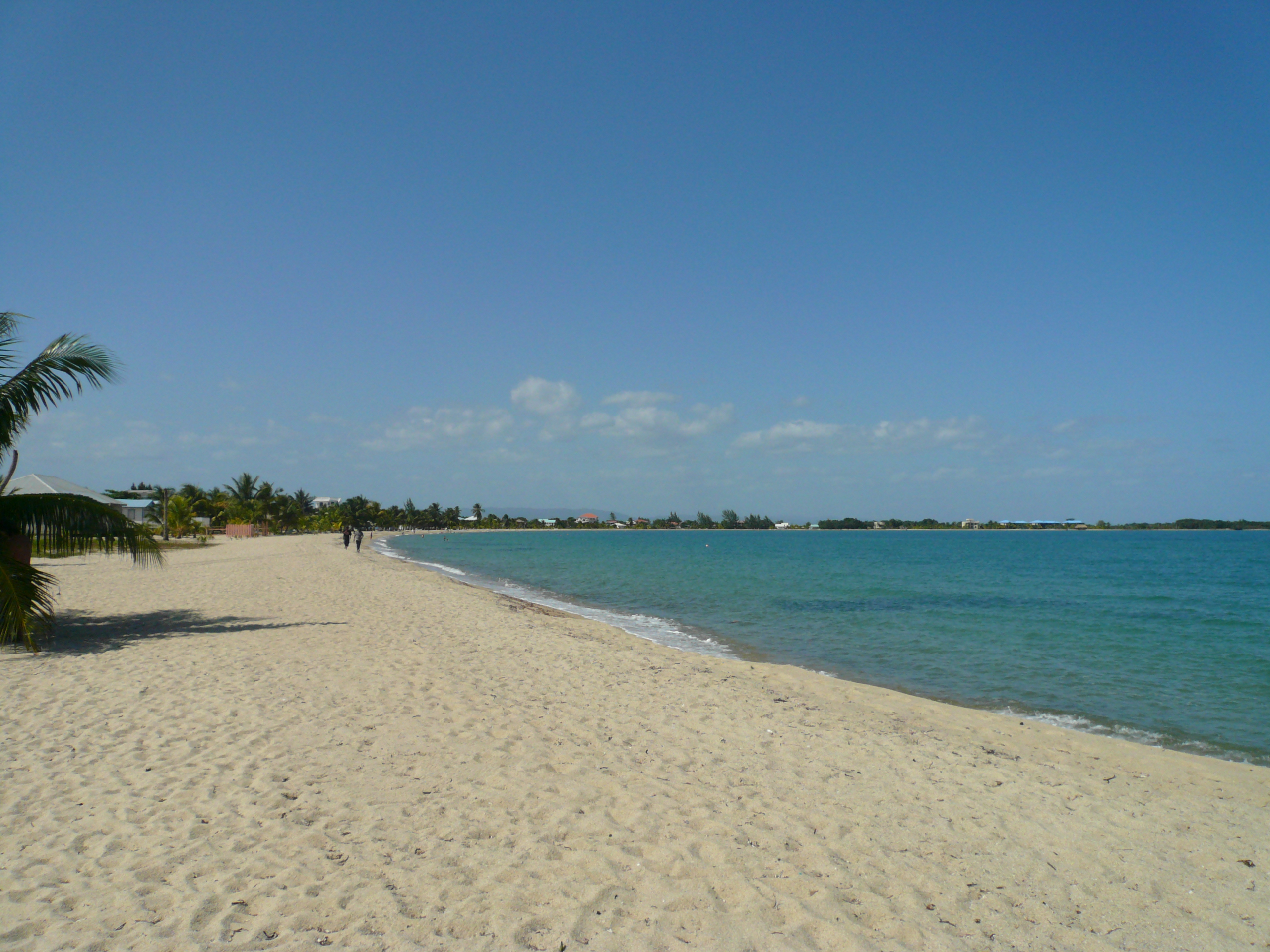
- Placencia Beach

- Location within Belize
- Coordinates: 16°30′50″N 88°22′0″W
- Country: Belize
- District: Stann Creek
- Constituency: Stann Creek West
- Elevation: 11 m (36 ft)

Population (2024)
  - Total: <2,000 (estimate)
- Time zone: UTC-6 (Central No DST)
- Climate: Am

Placencia is a small village located in the Stann Creek District of Belize.

== History ==
Prior to the European colonization of the Americas, the Placencia Peninsula was inhabited by the Maya. Archaeological evidence suggests that the Maya in this area produced salt and traded it with other settlements along the coast.

In the 17th century, Placencia was settled by English Puritans, originally from Nova Scotia and Providence Island. This settlement died out during the Spanish American wars of independence in the 1820s.

The Placencia Peninsula was resettled in the late 1800s by several families. Placencia prospered and soon became a village, earning its livelihood from the sea.

The Spaniards that traveled the southern coast of Belize gave Placencia its name. At that time Placencia was called Placentia, with the point being called Punta Placentia, or Pleasant Point.

In the late 20th century it became a significant tourism destination, and is now referred to as Placencia Village, or simply Placencia.

On October 8, 2001, Hurricane Iris hit southern Belize with 145 mph (233 km/h) winds causing major damage to nearly 95% of buildings in Placencia. Many developers took advantage of plummeted real estate value and an increased development of the peninsula and Placencia proper is consistently on the rise, as well as property value.

== Location and geographic setting ==
The eastern side of the Peninsula is a long expanse of white sand beach and heavy mangrove in some areas; the western side is bounded by a long narrow north–south trending bay of the Caribbean Sea. Significant settlements on the 18 miles (29 km) peninsula from North to South include Riversdale Village, Maya Beach Village, the Garifuna village of Seine Bight and finally, Placencia Village. Placencia, the southernmost village on the peninsula, is served by Placencia Airport.

== Demographics ==
The village is home to 1,512 permanent residents according to the 2010 census, while the Placencia Peninsula is home to 3,458 permanent residents, which includes citizens and ex-pats alike. At the time of the 2010 census, 41.9% of the population of Placencia were Creole, 24.5% Mestizo, 10.0% Mixed, 9.2% Caucasian, 3.2% Mopan Maya, 2.9% Garifuna, 2.7% Ketchi Maya, 2.5% East Indian, 1.0% Asian, 0.4% Yucatec Maya, 0.3% African and 1.3% others.

== Attractions ==
- Placencia, it used to be a fishing village but now offers some tourist amusement such as bars and entertainment like kayaking, snorkeling, diving, saltwater fly fishing, whale shark watching during the full moons between April and June of each year, light tackle saltwater fishing, as well as numerous restaurants and local art gallery.
- Diving at Gladden Spit from Placencia: Cubera snappers aggregate to spawn at Gladden Spit typically from 2 days before to 12 days after full moon from March to September with more than 10000 individuals. This event attracts many predators as well as whale sharks.
- Placencia Village, hosts the Placencia Lobster Fest, the Placencia Peninsula Arts Festival, Easter Week (similar to US Florida Spring Break).
- Placencia Lagoon, with manatees, dolphins, rays (the Lagoon is a nursery for some species of rays), mangrove forests, birding by canoe or kayak, fishing (juvenile tarpon, snook, barracuda), wetlands and sea grass beds.
- Mayan ruins of Nim Li Punit and Lubantuum are in the Toledo District, a day trip from the Placencia Peninsula.
- Cockscomb Basin Wildlife Sanctuary, which is also a day trip from Placencia.
- Maya Centre Village with 12 self-guided trails, 100,000 acres (400 km^{2}) forest jaguar preserve, and nearly 300 bird species.
- Mayflower Archaeological Reserve, 3 post-classic Maya ruins: Mayflower, T'au Witz and Maintzunun and waterfalls.
- Bladen River Reserve
- Maya Beach Village is a tiny community on the Placencia Peninsula, midway between Placencia Village to the south and Riversdale Village to the north. The closest village is Seine Bight, a historic Garifuna settlement. Approximately 1.5 miles (2.4 km) long, the Maya Beach area is made up of homes, small resorts and a few retail establishments including two small grocery stores, a half-dozen bars & restaurants, and an art gallery.

Placencia is known for its main street which is a sidewalk with many local gift shops, beach bars, hotels and cabanas.

- Ranguana Caye is a 2-acre private island 18 miles off the coast of Placencia and a major day-trip and overnight for those staying in the village and peninsula.
