= Philip S. W. Goldson International Airport =

Primary airport of Belize

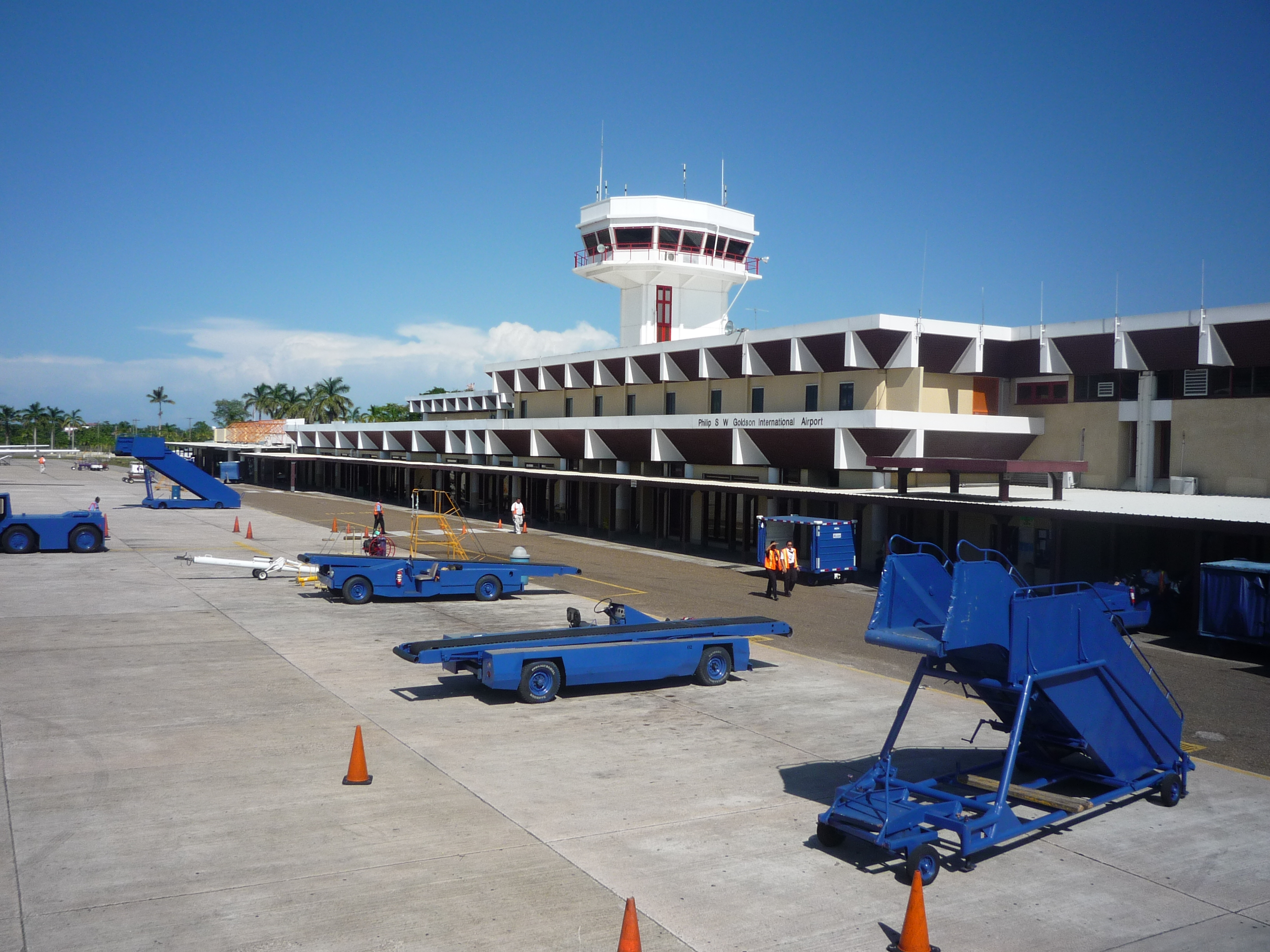
- IATA: BZE; ICAO: MZBZ

Summary
- Airport type: Public
- Serves: Belize City
- Location: Ladyville
- Hub for: Tropic Air; Maya Island Air; BermudAir
- Elevation AMSL: 5 m (16 ft)
- Coordinates: 17°32′21″N 088°18′30″W
- Website: pgiabelize.com

Map
- Location in Belize

Runways
Direction	Length		Surface
Direction	m	ft	Surface
07/25	2,950	9,678	Asphalt

Statistics (2024)
- Total Passengers: 1,229,000
- Aircraft movements: 34,187
- Source: Passenger and aircraft movement statistics from PGIA airport

Philip S. W. Goldson International Airport (IATA: BZE, ICAO: MZBZ) is an international airport that serves the nation of Belize's largest city, Belize City along the eastern coast of Central America. It was named after politician Philip S. W. Goldson, who died in 2001. The airport is at an elevation of 5 m (16 ft), which means both the airport and the entirety of Belize City are at risk of serious flooding due to its low elevation and coastal location. For this reason, Belize's capital has been moved to Belmopan, but the airport remains the largest and busiest in the country. With stable passenger growth, Philip S. W. Goldson International Airport is currently the fifth busiest airport in Central America. Belize Airport covers 457 acres (185 ha) of land and has one runway.

The airport is about 30 minutes drive from Belize City's centre, in Ladyville. In mid-2020, a new paved access road was completed from the George Price Highway, eight kilometres north, across the Belize River, directly to the side of the airfield where the passenger terminal is located.

== History ==
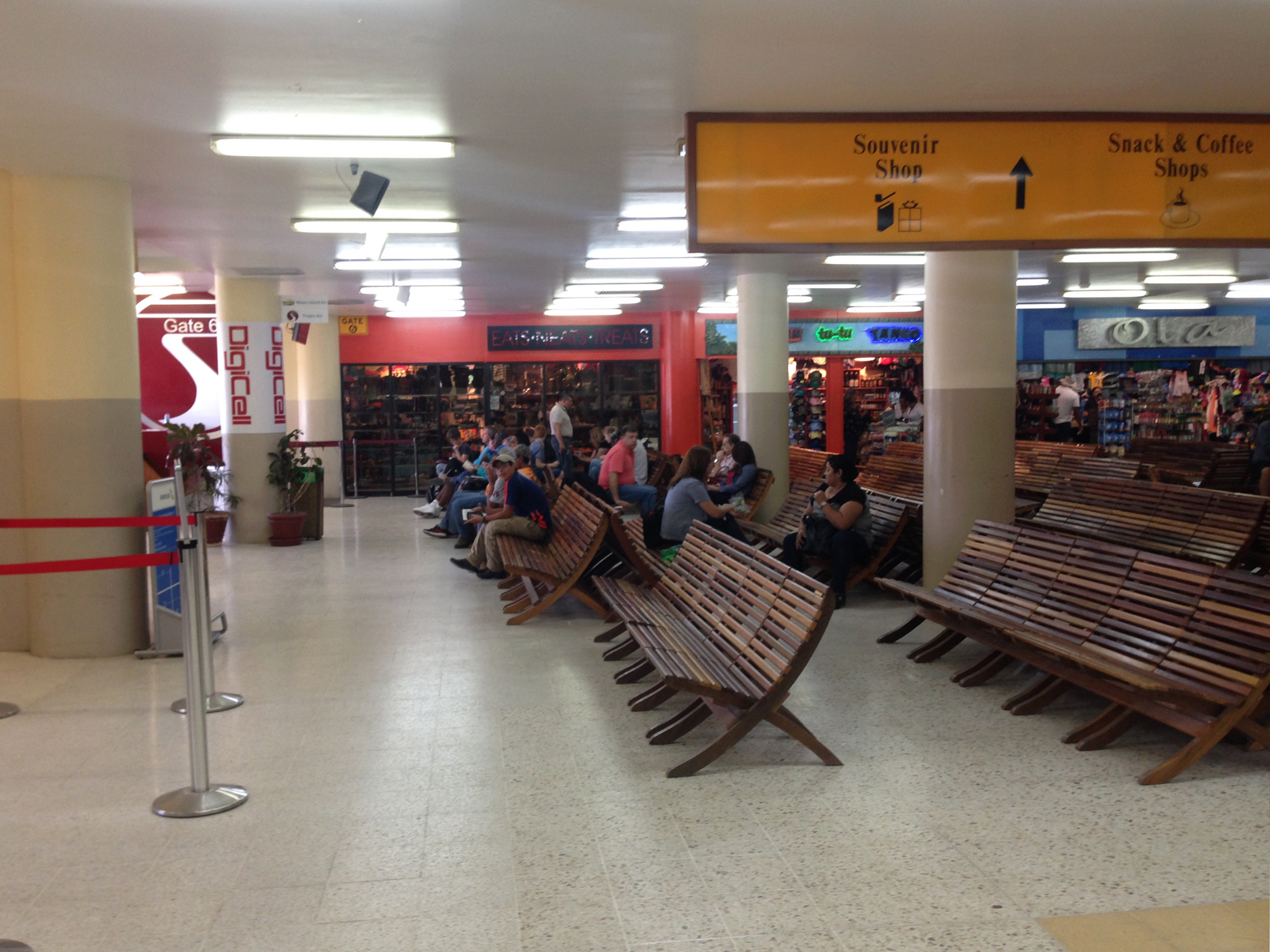
Gate 6

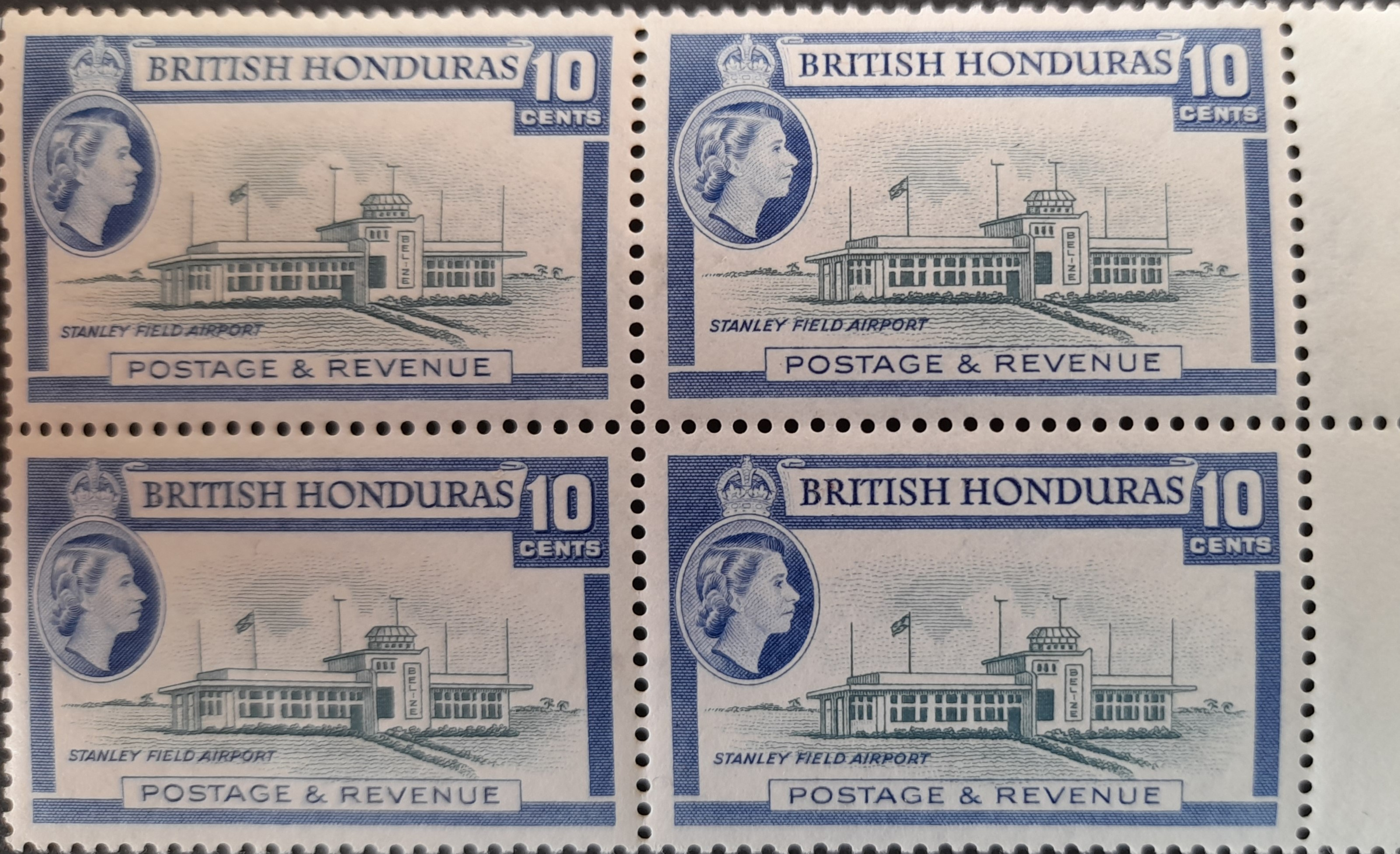
10 Cents Stanley Field, Belize airport British Honduras stamps. Queen Elizabeth II mint block of four right hand margin.

Belize airport, formerly called Stanley Field Airport was commemorated on British Honduras Queen Elizabeth II 10 Cents postage & revenue stamps. Then known as Belize International Airport it was renamed in honor of Philip S. W. Goldson on 7 February 1988.

== Military use ==
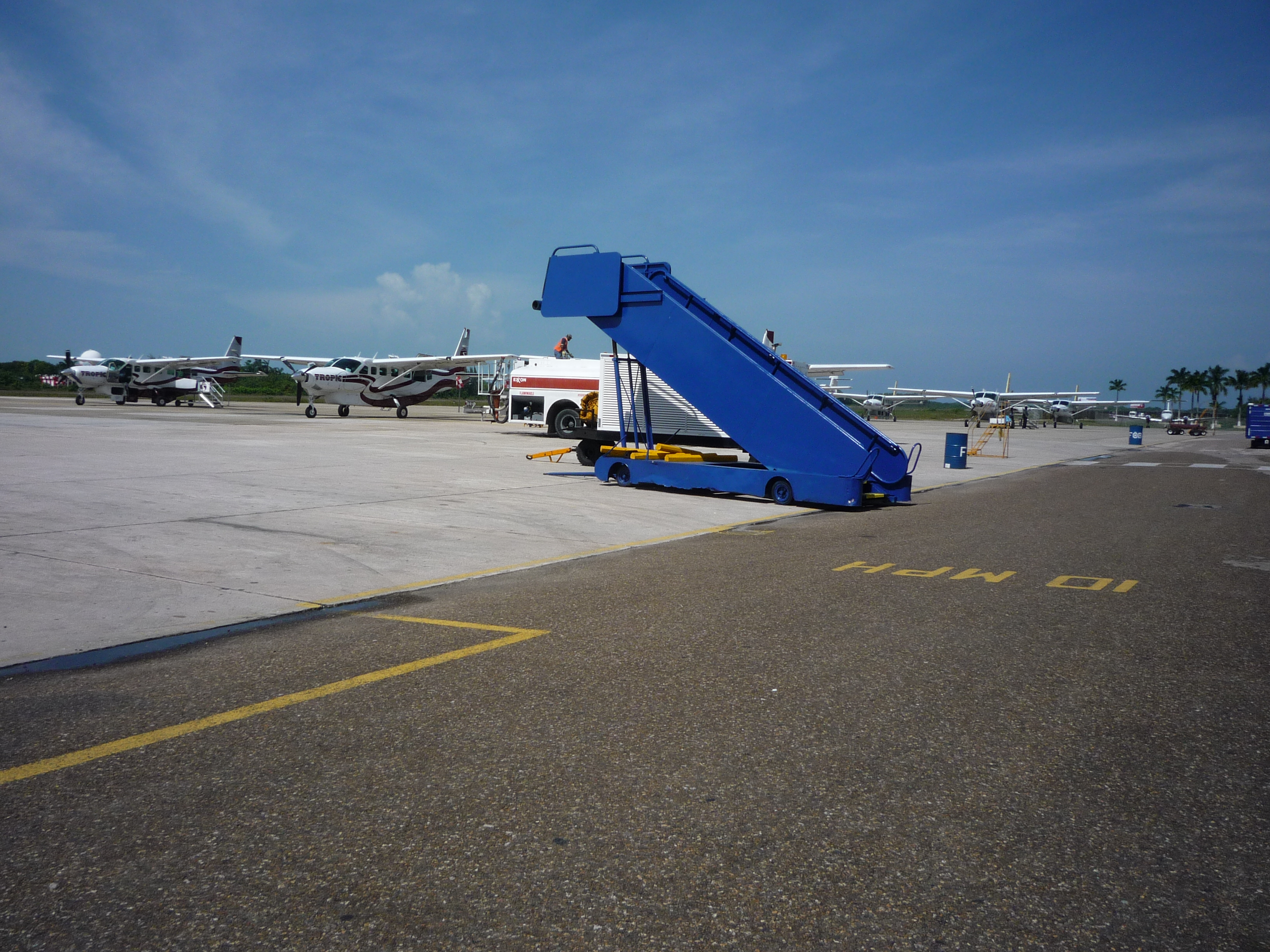
Philip Goldson International Airport, Belize

Due to the Belizean–Guatemalan territorial dispute, Philip S. W. Goldson International Airport has hosted several military units over the years since its construction. In 1984, a senior US Air Force General stated that it was "the best defended airfield in Central America". Most notable residents have been Headquarters British Forces Belize, No. 1417 (Tactical Ground Attack) Flight RAF operating Harrier jump jets, No. 1563 (Helicopter support) Flight RAF, resident Anti-Aircraft Squadrons of the RAF Regiment, resident helicopter units of the Army Air Corps, HarDet Belize, Butcher Radar and Belize Defence Forces, among others. Price Barracks is a military installation located just north of the airport, which was formerly known as Airport Camp, the headquarters of British Forces Belize.

== Historical airline service ==
In 1950, TACA Airlines (which is now Avianca El Salvador) was operating weekly nonstop flights to New Orleans and San Salvador as well as weekly direct one stop service to Managua with Douglas DC-4 propliners. TACA subsequently began operating Vickers Viscount turboprops on a weekly southbound service flying a routing of New Orleans - Belize City - Guatemala City - San Salvador - Tegucigalpa - Managua - San Jose, Costa Rica - Panama City, Panama. In 1953, British West Indian Airways (BWIA, which is now Caribbean Airlines) in association with British Overseas Airways Corporation (BOAC, which is now British Airways) was operating one flight a week to Belize from Kingston, Jamaica via an intermediate stop in Grand Cayman with a Vickers VC.1 Viking twin-prop aircraft with this flight offering connecting service via Kingston from a BOAC flight that operated a routing from London, England via stops in New York City, Nassau, Bahamas and Montego Bay, Jamaica. BWIA in conjunction with BOAC would later operate weekly nonstop service between the airport and Kingston with Vickers Viscount turboprop aircraft. Thirty years later in 1983, four airlines were operating jet service into the airport according to the Official Airline Guide (OAG) including Air Florida with nonstop Boeing 737-200 flights from Miami and San Pedro Sula, Servicio Aereo de Honduras (SAHSA) with nonstop Boeing 727-100 flights from Houston (via Houston Intercontinental Airport), New Orleans and San Pedro Sula, TACA Airlines International with nonstop Boeing 737-200 and British Aircraft Corporation BAC One-Eleven flights from Houston (via Houston Intercontinental Airport), Miami, New Orleans and San Salvador, and Transportes Aereos Nacionales (TAN Airlines) with nonstop Boeing 737-200 flights from Miami and San Pedro Sula while local air carrier Maya Airways was operating domestic service in Belize with Britten-Norman Islander twin-prop aircraft. Also according to the OAG, by 1989 TACA had introduced wide body Boeing 767-200 nonstop service to Miami in addition to its Boeing 737-200 flights with other service to Miami at this time being operated by Eastern Airlines with Boeing 727-200s as well as TAN with Boeing 737-200s.

Belize Airways Ltd. was a scheduled passenger airline based at the airport which operated flights to Miami, San Pedro Sula, San Salvador and La Ceiba with Boeing 720 and stretched British Aircraft Corporation BAC One-Eleven series 500 jetliners operated at various times during its existence from 1977 to 1980 according to its timetables.

== Airlines and destinations ==
=== Passenger ===
Airlines	Destinations
Air Canada Rouge	Seasonal: Montréal–Trudeau, Toronto–Pearson
Alaska Airlines	Los Angeles; Seasonal: Seattle/Tacoma
American Airlines	Dallas/Fort Worth, Miami; Seasonal: Charlotte
BermudAir	Seasonal: Boston (begins 19 December 2026), Fort Lauderdale, Guatemala City (begins 19 December 2026), Orlando/Sanford (begins 21 December 2026), Raleigh/Durham (begins 20 December 2026), St. Petersburg/Clearwater (begins 20 December 2026)
Copa Airlines	Panama City–Tocumen
Delta Air Lines	Atlanta; Seasonal: Minneapolis/St. Paul
Discover Airlines	Seasonal: Frankfurt (begins 16 December 2027)
Maya Island Air	Caye Caulker, Caye Chapel, Dangriga, Placencia, San Pedro
Southwest Airlines	Houston–Hobby; Seasonal: Baltimore, Denver
Sun Country Airlines	Seasonal: Minneapolis/St. Paul
TAG Airlines	Guatemala City
Tropic Air	Cancún, Caye Caulker, Corozal, Dangriga, Placencia, Punta Gorda, Roatán, San Pedro, San Pedro Sula
United Airlines	Houston–Intercontinental; Seasonal: Chicago–O'Hare, Denver, Los Angeles, Newark, San Francisco
WestJet	Seasonal: Calgary, Toronto–Pearson, Winnipeg (begins 14 December 2026)

Domestic destinations map
Domestic destinations
Blue = Philip S. W. Goldson International Airport
Red = Year-round destination
Green = Seasonal destination

Central America destinations map
Central America destinations
Blue = Philip S. W. Goldson International Airport
Red = Year-round destination
Green = Seasonal destination

Canada, United States, and Mexico destinations map
Canada, United States, and Mexico destinations
Blue = Philip S. W. Goldson International Airport
Red = Year-round destination
Green = Seasonal destination

== Accidents and incidents ==
On 17 April 2025, a US national hijacked Tropic Air Flight 711 flying from Corozal to San Pedro, stabbing and injuring two passengers. He was shot dead by another passenger after the aircraft made an emergency landing at the airport.
