= Tropic Air =

Belizean airline

IATA	ICAO	Call sign
9N	TOS	TROPISER
- Founded: 1979
- Hubs: Philip S. W. Goldson International Airport; San Pedro
- Frequent-flyer program: TropicMiles
- Fleet size: 15
- Destinations: 13
- Headquarters: San Pedro, Belize
- Key people: Maximillian Greif (Owner & CEO)
- Website: www.tropicair.com

Tropic Air is an airline operating scheduled services from Belize. Founded in 1979 by John Greif III with just a single airplane and two employees, Tropic has steadily grown to a fleet of 17 light aircraft and now operates over 200 daily scheduled flights. The airline flies to 13 destinations in Belize, Mexico, Guatemala, El Salvador and Honduras. The airline also offers private charters as well as various sightseeing tours.

== Destinations ==
Belize

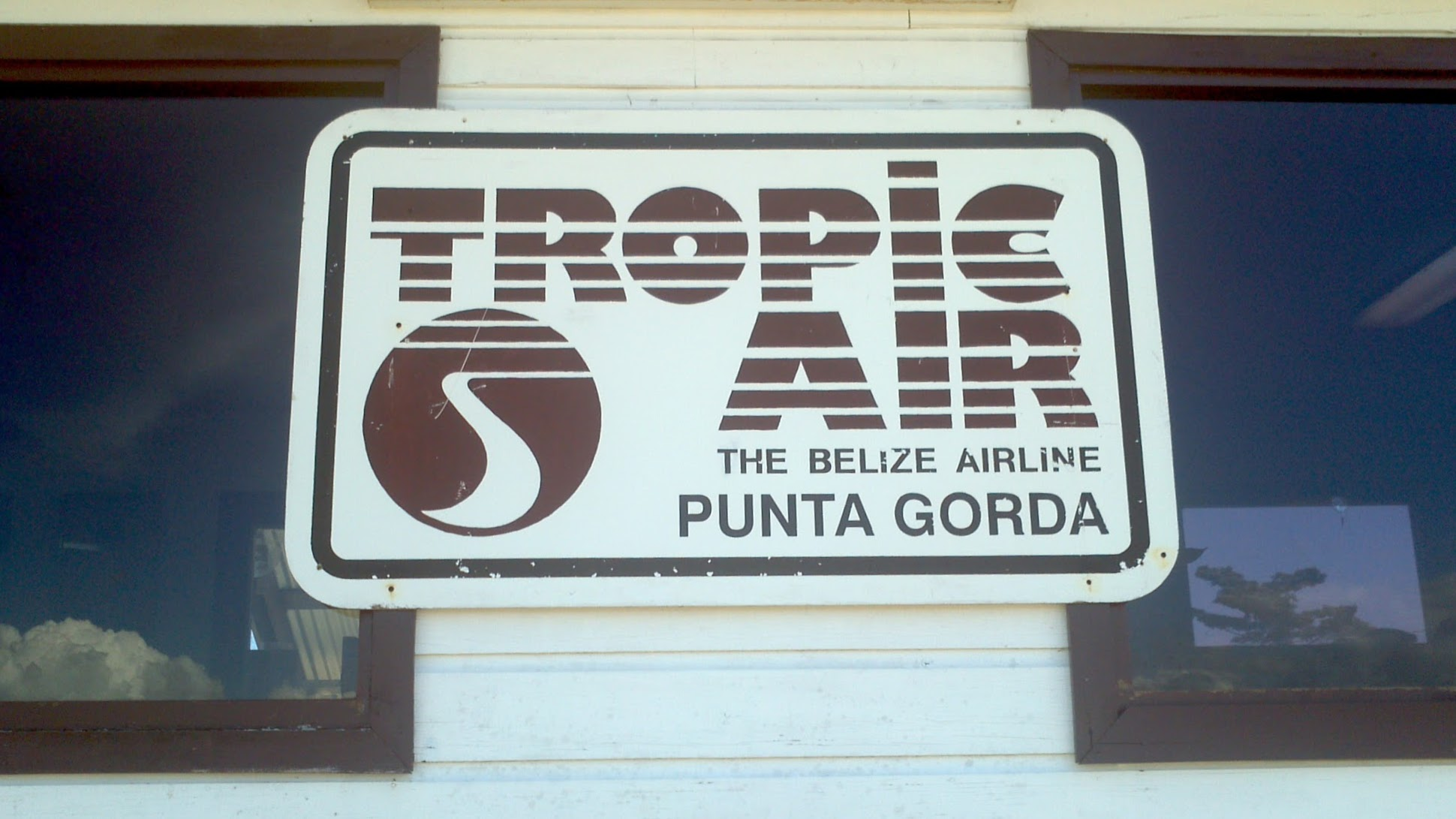
Tropic Air's Punta Gorda location

- Ambergris Caye - John Greif II Airport
- Belize City
  - Sir Barry Bowen Municipal Airport
  - Philip S. W. Goldson International Airport
- Caye Caulker - Caye Caulker Airport
- Corozal - Corozal Airport
- Dangriga - Dangriga Airport
- Placencia - Placencia Airport
- Punta Gorda - Punta Gorda Airport

Guatemala

- Guatemala City - La Aurora International Airport

Honduras

- Roatan - Juan Manuel Gálvez International Airport
- San Pedro Sula - Ramón Villeda Morales International Airport

Mexico

- Cancun - Cancún International Airport

El Salvador

- San Salvador - El Salvador International Airport

== Fleet ==
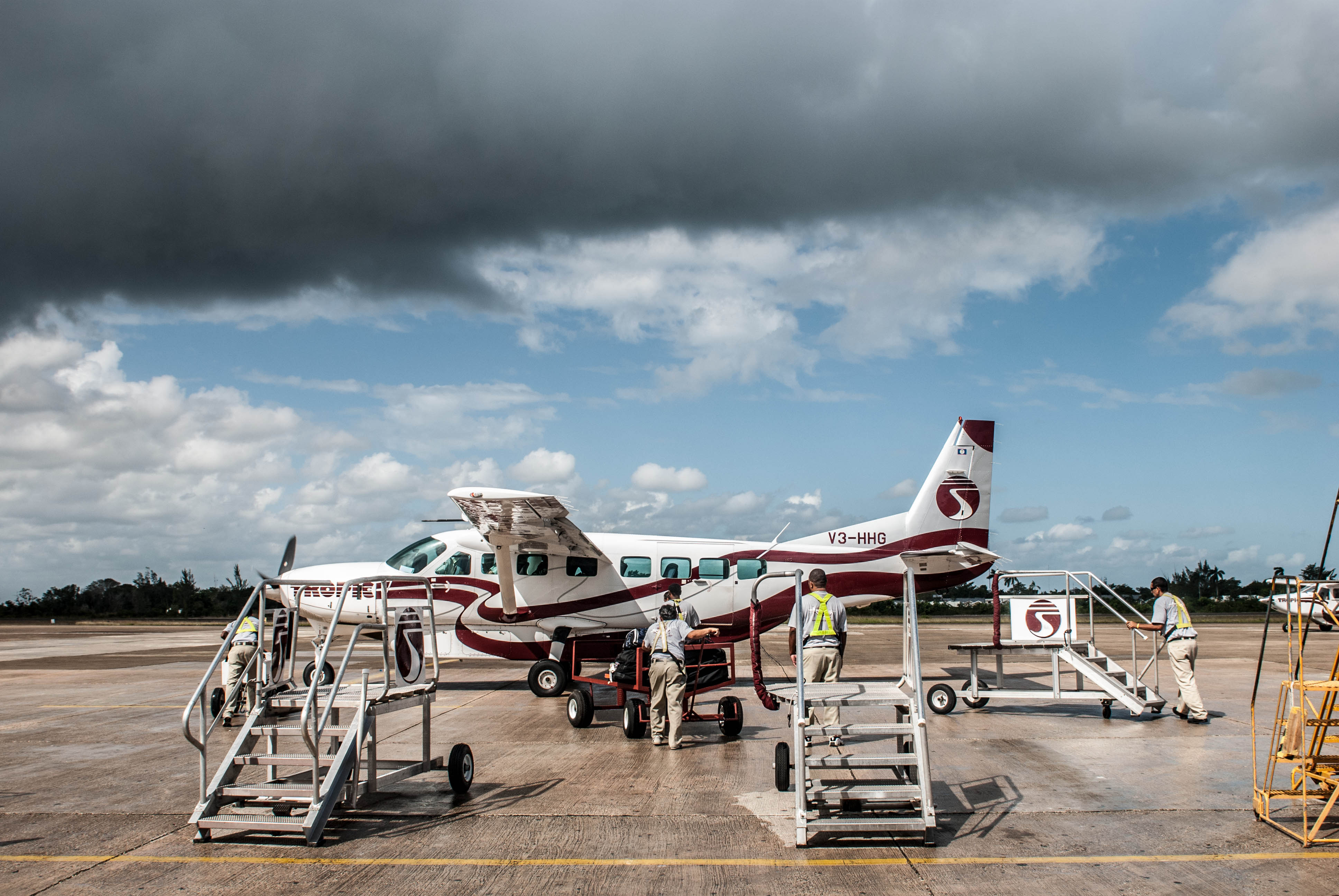
A Tropic Air Cessna 208 Caravan

The Tropic Air fleet consists of the following aircraft:

Aircraft	In service	Notes
Cessna 208 Caravan	15	More aircraft on order
Total	15	

A de Havilland Canada DHC-6 Twin Otter is also leased seasonally.

== Accidents and incidents ==
- 1 April 1991: a Cessna 402B, while on approach to San Pedro Airport, crashed into the sea while making a go around. All 8 occupants were killed, making this the deadliest aviation accident in Belize.
- 4 December 2014: a Cessna 208B Grand Caravan overran the runway upon landing at the Belize City Municipal Airport and came to rest in the waters of the Caribbean Sea. Nobody was hurt.
- 17 November 2017: a Cessna 208B Grand Caravan on a domestic flight to Punta Gorda Airport in Belize with seven people on board, including the acting prime minister of Belize Patrick Faber and Agriculture Minister Godwin Hulse, ditched in the sea just after it lifted off the runway at Placencia Airport, after one of its main landing gear wheels hit a vehicle. Several occupants of the aircraft and a passenger in the vehicle were injured, but there were no fatalities. The runway at Placencia Airport is very close to a road that has boom gates to stop vehicles while aircraft are landing or taking off; one of the gates reportedly failed to deploy.
- 17 April 2025: Tropic Air Flight 711, a Cessna 208B Grand Caravan EX was hijacked by a man armed with a knife, while it was flying from Corozal Airport to John Greif II Airport. The aircraft managed to make an emergency landing in Belize City, where the hijacker was shot dead. In addition 3 of the 16 occupants were injured.
