= Corozal Airport =

Airport in Ranchito, Belize

Corozal Airport Ranchito Airport
- IATA: CZH; ICAO: MZCZ

Summary
- Airport type: Public
- Serves: Corozal, Belize
- Location: Ranchito
- Elevation AMSL: 4.0 ft (1.2 m)
- Coordinates: 18°22′55″N 88°24′40″W

Map
- Location in Belize

Runways
Direction	Length		Surface
Direction	m	ft	Surface
07/25	670	2,198	Asphalt
- Sources: GCM SkyVector

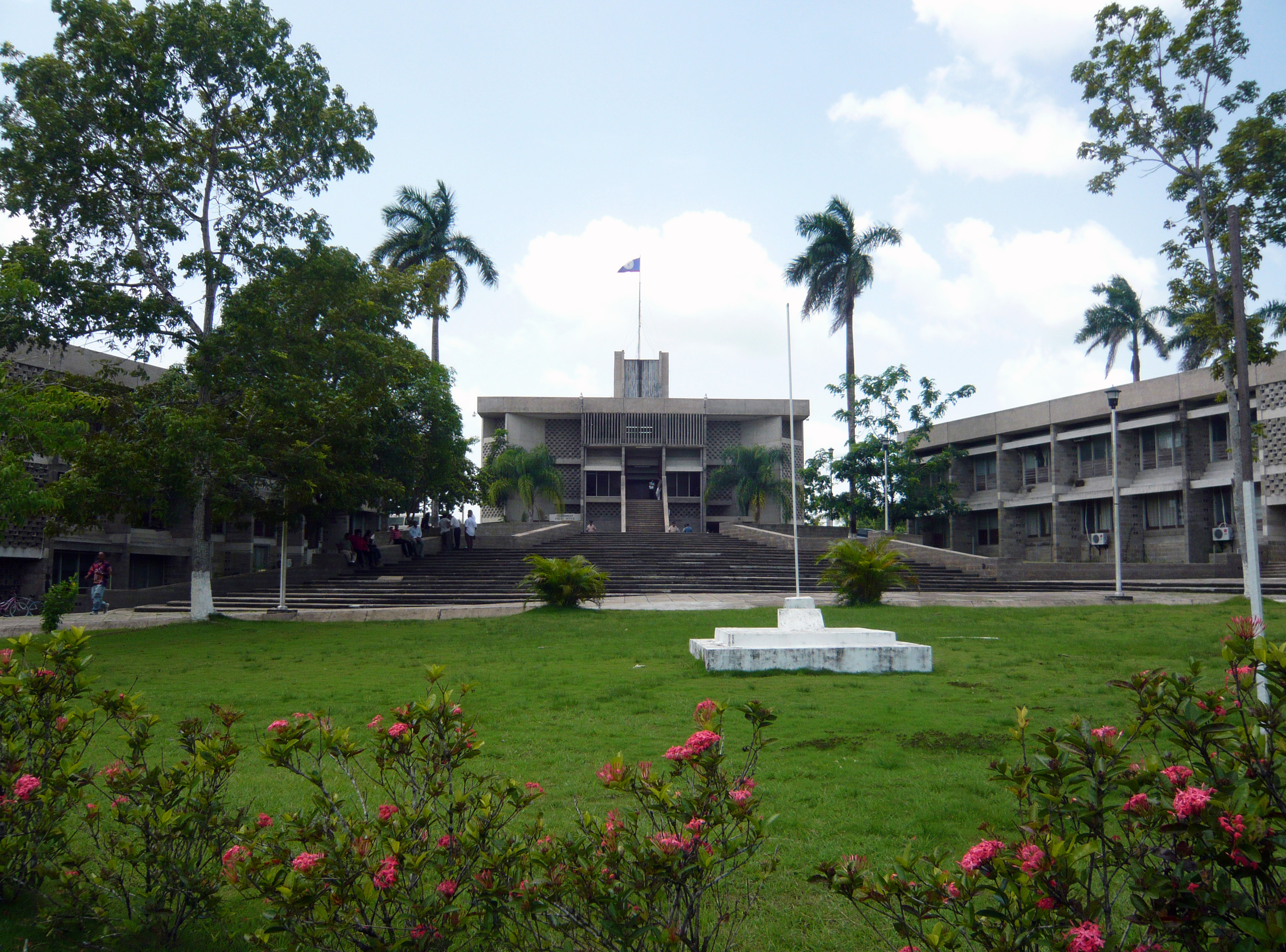
Parliament of Belize, Belmopan

Corozal Airport (IATA: CZH, ICAO: MZCZ) is an airport that serves Corozal, Belize. It is located at the south entrance of Corozal, in Ranchito village, and is therefore known as Ranchito Airport.

== Airlines and destinations ==
=== Passenger ===
Airlines	Destinations
Tropic Air	San Pedro

== See also ==
- Transport in Belize
- List of airports in Belize
