= List of oceanographic institutions and programs =

List of programs around the world doing marine science and oceanography research

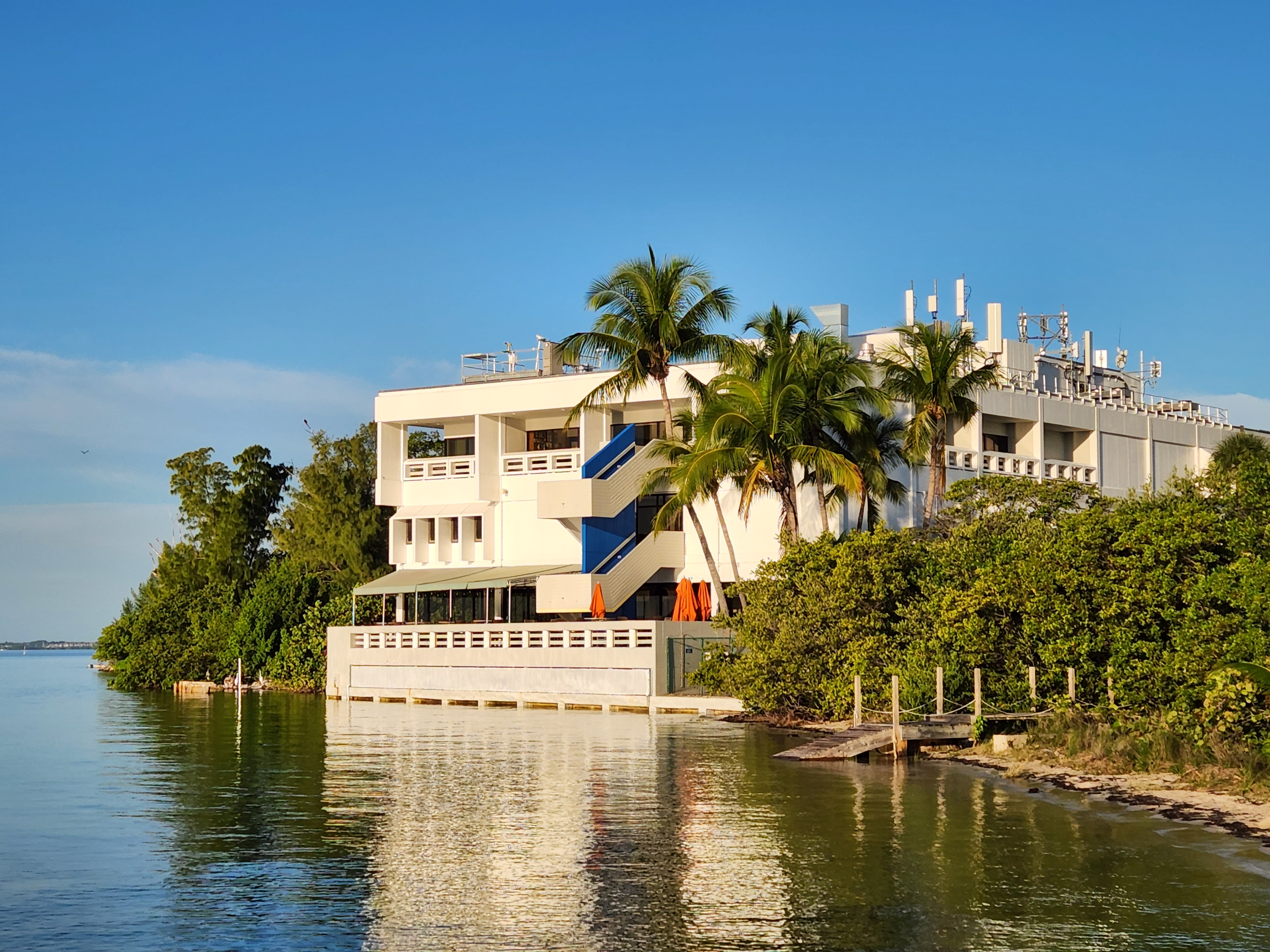
The Marine Science Center at the Rosenstiel School of Marine, Atmospheric, and Earth Science at the University of Miami in the United States

This is a list of oceanography institutions and programs worldwide. Oceanographic institutions and programs are broadly defined as places where scientific research is carried out relating to oceanography. This list is organized geographically. Some oceanographic institutions are standalone programs, such as non-governmental organizations or government-funded agencies. Other oceanographic institutions are departments within colleges and universities. While oceanographic research happens at many other departments at other colleges and universities, such as Biology and Geology departments, this list focuses on larger departments and large research centers specifically devoted to oceanography and marine science. Aquaria are not listed here.

== International ==
=== International oceanographic programs ===
- Intergovernmental Oceanographic Commission, UNESCO
- International Council for the Exploration of the Sea, (ICES)
- International Hydrographic Organization
- International Ocean Discovery Program, formerly called the Integrated Ocean Drilling Program.
- InterRidge, an international research collaboration on oceanic seafloor spreading zones.
- Mediterranean Science Commission, (CIESM)
- North Pacific Marine Science Organization (PICES)
- Scientific Committee on Oceanic Research, part of the International Science Council.

=== Societies and professional affiliations ===
- American Geophysical Union
- Association for the Sciences of Limnology and Oceanography
- Coastal and Estuarine Research Federation
- European Geosciences Union
- The Oceanography Society

== Institutions by country ==
=== Australia ===
- Australian Institute of Marine Science, Queensland
- Australian Marine Sciences Association, the professional body for marine scientists
- Australian Meteorological and Oceanographic Society, a scholarly society
- Commonwealth Scientific and Industrial Research Organisation, Canberra
- Institute for Marine and Antarctic Studies, Hobart, Tasmania
- Sydney Institute of Marine Science
- University of New South Wales, Sydney

=== Bangladesh ===
- Bangabandhu Sheikh Mujibur Rahman Maritime University, Dhaka. BSMRMU
- Bangladesh Oceanographic Research Institute, Ramu, Cox's Bazar. BORI
- Institute of Marine Sciences, University of Chittagong was the country's first marine research institution, inaugurated in 1971.
- University of Chittagong, Chittagong-4331, Chattogram. of Oceanography
- Patuakhali Science and Technology University, Dumki-8602, Patuakhali. Department of Marine Fisheries and Oceanography (MFO)
- Shahjalal University of Science & Technology, Sylhet. Department of Oceanography
- Sylhet Agricultural University, Sylhet-3100. Department of Coastal and Marine Fisheries
- University of Dhaka, Department of Oceanography

=== Belgium ===
- European Global Ocean Observing System, Brussels.
- European Marine Board, an international organization based in Oostende, Belgium. European Marine Board
- Flanders Marine Institute, Oostende. VLIZ
- University of Liège, Interfacultary Center for Marine Research MARE

=== Belize ===
- Wee Wee Caye Marine Lab on an island off the coast of Stann Creek District.

=== Bermuda ===
- Bermuda Institute of Ocean Sciences, an independent science and education institute in Ferry Reach, St. Georges. BIOS

=== Brazil ===
Brazilian national programs:

- Admiral Paulo Moreira Institute for Marine Studies in Arraial do Cabo, Rio de Janeiro is associated with the Brazilian Navy. IEAPM
- National Institute for Oceanographic and Waterway Research. INPOH
- National Institute for Space Research in São Paulo conducts ocean remote sensing research. INPE

Brazilian universities with oceanography departments or institutes:

- Centro Universitário Monte Serrat. Oceanografia, UNIMONTE
- Center for Marine Studies in Pontal do Paraná, associated with the Federal University of Paraná.
- Fundação Universidade Federal do Rio Grande. FURG
- Oceanographic Institute of the University of São Paulo. USP
- Universidade do Vale do Itajaí. UNIVALI Oceanography
- Universidade do Estado do Rio de Janeiro. Faculdade de Oceanografia, UERJ
- Universidade Federal da Bahia. Curso de Graduação em Oceanografia, UFBA
- Universidade Federal de São Paulo. Departamento de Ciências do Mar, UNIFESP
- Universidade Federal de Santa Catarina. UFSC
- Universidade Federal do Ceará. UFC
- Universidade Federal do Espírito Santo. Oceanografia na UFES
- Universidade Federal do Maranhão. UFMA
- Universidade Federal do Pará. UFPA
- Universidade Federal do Paraná. UFPR
- Universidade Federal do Pernambuco. UFPE

=== Bulgaria ===
- Agricultural Academy Institute of Fish Resources in Varna. Institute of Fish Resources
- Bulgarian Academy of Sciences in Varna. Institute of Oceanology

=== Cameroon ===
- National Oceanographic Data Centre of Cameroon. NODC

=== Canada ===
- Bamfield Marine Sciences Centre, a marine research station in Barkley Sound, British Columbia associated with several nearby universities. Bamfield MSC
- Bedford Institute of Oceanography, a governmental research facility in Dartmouth, Nova Scotia. BIO
- Bellairs Research Institute in Barbados is a field station of McGill University. Bellairs
- Canadian Meteorological and Oceanographic Society. CMOS
- Dalhousie University, Halifax, Nova Scotia. Oceanography Department
- Fisheries and Oceans Canada, organized into seven administrative regions of Canada. Fisheries and Oceans Canada
- Institute of Ocean Sciences in British Columbia, operated by Fisheries and Oceans Canada.
- Maurice Lamontagne Institute in Mont Joli, Quebec, operated by Fisheries and Oceans Canada.
- Memorial University, St. John's, Newfoundland and Labrador. Fisheries and Marine Institute
- Northwest Atlantic Fisheries Centre in St. John's, Newfoundland and Labrador. NAFC
- Ocean Frontier Institute, housed at the Memorial University of Newfoundland and Dalhousie University. OFI
- Ocean Networks Canada, an ocean observing program run by the University of Victoria similar to the Ocean Observatories Initiative.
- Université du Québec à Rimouski, Institut des Sciences de la mer ISMER

=== China ===
- Chinese Academy of Sciences, Institute of Oceanology. Institute of Oceanology
- Chinese Academy of Sciences, South China Sea Institute of Oceanology. SCSIO
- East China Normal University's State Key Laboratory of Estuarine and Coastal Research SKLEC
- Ocean University of China in Qingdao, Shandong. OUC
- State Key Laboratory of Satellite Ocean Environment Dynamics in Hangzhou. SOED
- State Oceanic Administration, First Institute of Oceanography. FIO
- State Oceanic Administration, Second Institute of Oceanography. SIO.
- The University of Hong Kong's Swire Institute of Marine Science on the Cape d'Aguilar Peninsula on Hong Kong Island. SWIMS

=== Colombia ===
Colombian national programs:

- Centro de Investigaciones Oceanográficas e Hidrográficas del Caribe, General Maritime Directorate. CIOH
- Centro de Investigaciones Oceanográficas e Hidrográficas del Pacífico, General Maritime Directorate. CCCP
- José Benito Vives de Andréis Marine and Coastal Research Institute in Santa Marta, Magdalena. INVEMAR

Colombian universities with oceanography programs:

- Colombian Naval Academy: Escuela Naval de Cadetes "Almirante Padilla" in Cartagena, Oceanography program.
- EAFIT University in Medellín, Marine Sciences Group.
- National University of Colombia’s School of Mines in Medellín, Oceanography and Coastal Engineering Research Group. OCEANICOS
- Universidad Jorge Tadeo Lozano in Bogotá, Dynamics and Management of Coastal Marine Ecosystems program DIMARCO
- University of Antioquia offers Oceanography undergraduate program and Marine Sciences doctorate program.

=== Croatia ===
- Institute of Oceanography and Fisheries in Split is supported by the Croatian Science Foundation. IOR
- Ruđer Bošković Institute, Center for Marine Research in Rovinj. CMR
- University of Dubrovnik, Institute for Marine and Coastal Research. IMP-DU

=== Cyprus ===
- Τhe Oceanography Center of the University of Cyprus (OC-UCY) is oceanographic research focusing on the Eastern Mediterranean at University of Cyprus Nicosia, Cyprus.

=== Denmark ===
- Danish Maritime Safety Administration in Copenhagen. DaMSA
- Technical University of Denmark in Copenhagen.
- Copenhagen University's Research Centre on Ocean, Climate, and Society. ROCS

=== Ecuador ===
- Escuela Superior Politécnica del Litoral has programs in Marine Engineering, Biological Sciences, and Natural Resources. FIMCBOR
- Instituto Oceanográfico de la Armada, part of the Ecuadorian Navy, in Guayaquil. INOCAR

=== Finland ===
- Finnish Environment Institute's Marine Research Center. SYKE
- Finnish Institute of Marine Research in Helsinki.
- Finnish Meteorological Institute's Marine Research unit. FMI

=== France ===
- Académie de Marine, originally the Royal Naval Academy of France. Académie de Marine
- Banyuls-sur-Mer Oceanographic Observatory, also called Laboratoire Arago. OOB
- European University Institute of Marine Sciences in Brest. IUEM
- French Research Institute for Exploitation of the Sea in Brest. IFREMER
- Institut océanographique de Paris, associated with the Institut océanographique in Monaco.
- Institute of Environmental Geosciences in Grenoble, associated with the Grenoble Alps University. IGE
- Laboratory of Space Geophysical and Oceanographic Studies in Toulouse. LEGOS
- Lille University of Science and Technology's Wimereaux Marine Station
- Marine Biological Station and Concarneau Marinarium, associated with the French National Museum of Natural History. Station Marine de Concarneau
- Marine Station of Arcachon, associated with the University Bordeaux, on Arcachon Bay. Station marine d'Arcachon
- Mediterranean Institute of Oceanography in Marseille. MIO
- Naval Hydrographic and Oceanographic Service in Brest. SHOM
- Laboratoire d'Océanographie de Villefranche-sur-Mer on the French Riviera. [www.obs-vlfr.fr Obs-Vlfr]
- Oceanography and Climate Laboratory in Paris LOCEAN
- Paul Ricard Oceanographic Institute on the island of Embiez near Six-Fours-les-Plages.
- Roscoff Marine Station, associated with Sorbonne University, is the oldest marine research station in the world. SB-Roscoff

=== Germany ===
- Alfred Wegener Institute for Polar and Marine Research in Bremerhaven. AWI
- Center for Marine Environmental Sciences in Bremen. MARUM
- GEOMAR Helmholtz Centre for Ocean Research Kiel. GEOMAR
- German Marine Research Consortium in Berlin. KDM
- Helmholtz-Zentrum Hereon in Geesthacht, part of the Helmholtz Association, has research programs in marine sciences. HZG
- Institute for Chemistry and Biology of the Marine Environment in Oldenburg, Wilhelmshaven. ICBM
- Integrated School of Ocean Sciences at Kiel University. ISOS
- Leibniz Institute for Baltic Sea Research in Warnemünde .IOW
- Leibniz Centre for Tropical Marine Research in Bremen. ZMT
- Max Planck Institute for Meteorology in Hamburg. MPI-M
- Senckenberg by the Sea in Wilhelmshaven. Senckenberg am Meer
- The Future Ocean, a collaborative research group based out of Kiel.
- University of Hamburg's Institute of Oceanography. IfM

=== Greece ===
- Hellenic Centre for Marine Research in Anavyssos. HCMR
- University of the Aegean in Mytilene, Lesvos. Department of Marine Sciences

=== Iceland ===
- Marine and Freshwater Research Institute in Hafnarfjörður, associated with the Ministry of Industries and Innovation. MFRI
- University of Iceland's Marine Academic Research in Iceland group in Reykjavik. MARICE

=== India ===
Indian national programs:

- Center for Marine Living Resources in Kerala, under the Ministry of Earth Sciences. CMLRE
- Central Marine Fisheries Research Institute, Kochi, Kerala, under the Indian Council of Agricultural Research. CMFRI
- National Centre for Ocean Information Services in Pragathi Nagar, Hyderabad. ESSO-INCOIS
- National Institute of Oceanography in Goa.
- National Atmospheric Research Laboratory in Andhra, Pradesh. NARL
- National Centre for Polar and Ocean Research in Goa. NCAOR
- National Centre for Sustainable Coastal Management in Chennai, Tamil Nadu. NCSCM
- National Institute of Ocean Technology in Chennai, Tamil Nadu. NIOT
- National Center for Coastal Research in Chennai, under the Ministry of Earth Sciences. NCCR
- National Centre for Earth Science Studies in Kerala. NCESS
- Central Institute of Brackishwater Aquaculture in Chennai, Tamil Nadu. CIBA
- Central Institute of Fisheries Technology in Cochin, Kerala. ICFT
- Central Institute of Fisheries Education in Mumbai. CIFE
- Fishery Survey of India in Mumbai. FSI
- National Institute of Fisheries Post Harvest Technology and Training in Ernakulum, Kerala. NIFPHATT

Indian universities with oceanography programs:

Central:

- University of Allahabad, K. Banerjee Centre for Atmospheric and Ocean Studies. KBCAOS

Eastern:

- Indian Institute of Technology Kharagpur’s Centre for Oceans, Rivers, Atmosphere and Land Sciences (CORAL) in West Bengal.
- Berhampur University, Department of Marine Sciences, Odisha.
- University of Calcutta, Department of Marine Science, Kolkata. MarineSc
- Jadavpur University, School of Oceanographic Studies, Kolkata. Ocean-JU
- Indian Institute of Technology Bhubaneswar, School of Earth, Ocean and Climate Sciences, Odisha. IIT Bhubaneswar OC

Northern:

- Indian Institute of Technology Delhi, Centre for Atmospheric Sciences. CAS
- Central University of Punjab, Bathinda.

Southern:

- Academy of Maritime Education and Training in Chennai, Tamil Nadu.
- Andhra University, Department of Meteorology and Oceanography.
- Anna University, Institute of Ocean Management, Chennai, Tamil Nadu. IOM
- Annamalai University, Center of Advanced Study in Marine Biology, Tamil Nadu. CASMB
- Alagappa University, Karaikudi, Tamil Nadu. Department of Fisheries Science Department of Oceanography and Coastal Area Studies, Alagappa University, Karaikudi, Tamil Nadu.
- Bharathidasan University, Tiruchirappalli. Department of Marine Science
- Cochin University of Science and Technology in Kerala. has several departments in its School of Marine Sciences. SMSCUSAT
- Indian Institute of Science ‘s Centre for Atmospheric and Oceanic Sciences in Bengalaru. CAOS
- Kerala University of Fisheries and Ocean Studies in Kochi, Kerala.
- Madurai Kamaraj University, School of Energy Environment & Natural Resources, Tamil Nadu. SEENR
- Manonmaniam Sundaranar University, Centre for Marine Science and Technology, Rajakkamangalam, Kanyakumari. CMST
- M.E.S. Ponnani College, Ponnani, Malappuram, Kerala. Department of Aquaculture and Fishery Microbiology
- Nansen Environmental Research Centre India, Kerala, established by joint Norwegian and Indian partners, now a research center of Kerala University. NERCI
- Pondicherry University, Department of Ocean Studies and Marine Biology, Port Blair, Andaman Islands. Center for Ocean and Island Studies
- St. Albert's College, Kochi, Kerala. Department of Fisheries & Aquaculture
- University of Hyderabad, Center for Earth, Ocean, and Atmospheric Sciences, formerly called the formerly Centre for Earth and Space Sciences. CEOAS
- University of Kerala, Department of Aquatic Biology and Fisheries.
- University of Madras, Centre for Ocean and Coastal Studies, Chennai, Tamil Nadu. COCS

Western:

- Goa University, Department of Marine Sciences. Department of Marine Sciences

=== Indonesia ===
- Bandung Institute of Technology has programs in Oceanography under the Faculty of Earth Sciences and Technology and Ocean Engineering under the Faculty of Civil and Environmental Engineering.
- Bogor Agricultural Institute, Department of Marine Science and Technology.
- Diponegoro University, Faculty of Fisheries and Marine Sciences, Semarang, Central Java.
- Indonesian Institute of Sciences’s Research Center for Oceanography, Jakarta. Puslit Oseanografi LIPI
- University of Riau, Marine Science Department, Pekanbaru.

=== Iran ===
- Tarbiat Modares University, Marine Science Faculty, Tehran.
- Iranian National Institute for Oceanography and Atmospheric Science, Tehran.
- Khorramshahr Marine Science and Technology University, Khorramshahr. KMSU
- Islamic Azad University, Science and Research Branch, Tehran, Faculty of Marine Science and Technologies.

=== Ireland ===
- Marine Institute Ireland, a state agency in Galway.
- National University of Ireland, Galway, Ryan Institute for Environmental, Marine and Energy Research. The Ryan Institute
- University College Cork, SFI Research Centre for Energy, Climate and Marine research and innovation. MaREI

=== Israel ===
- Ben-Gurion University of the Negev, Beersheba. Department of Earth and Environmental Sciences
- Israel Oceanographic & Limnological Research Institute, which has research centers in Haifa, Kinneret, and Eilat. IOLR
- University of Haifa, The Leon H. Charney School of Marine Sciences in Haifa. MarSci Haifa

=== Italy ===
- Italian National Research Council, Institute for the Study of Anthropic Impacts and Sustainability in Marine Environment. CNR-IAS
- Italian National Research Council, Institute for Marine Biological Resources and Biotechnology. CNR-IRBIM
- Italian National Research Council, Institute of Marine Sciences. CNR-ISMAR
- National Institute of Oceanography and Experimental Geophysics (Istituto Nazionale di Oceanografia e di Geofisica Sperimentale) in Sgonico. OGS
- National Inter-University Consortium of Marine Sciences, a collaboration between 35 Italian Universities. CoNISMa

=== Japan ===
- Okinawa Institute of Science and Technology in Onna, Okinawa, includes Marine Science as one subject in the multi-disciplinary research profile of the graduate program. OIST
- Japan Agency for Marine-Earth Science and Technology in Yokosuka, Kanagawa. JAMSTEC
- Tokyo University of Marine Science and Technology in Koto, Tokyo. TUMSAT
- Kobe University, Department of Oceanology, Kobe, Hyogo. Faculty of Oceanology
- University of the Ryukyus in Nakagami, Okinawa includes Oceanography and Marine Biology as areas of study. Faculty of Science
- Usa Marine Biological Institute in Usa, Kochi.

=== Latvia ===
- Institute of Food Safety, Animal Health and Environment “BIOR” in Riga conducts research in the areas of Environmental Science and Fisheries. BIOR
- Latvian Institute of Aquatic Ecology, Riga. LIAE

=== Lithuania ===
- Klaipėda University, Coastal Research and Planning Institute, on the Baltic Sea coast.

=== Mexico ===
- Autonomous University of Baja California, Ensenada, Institute for Oceanographic Research, and Faculty of Marine Sciences. UABC IIO, UABC Facultad de Ciencias Marinas
- Autonomous University of Sinaloa, Faculty of Marine Sciences in Mazatlán.
- Centro de Investigaciones Biológicas del Noroeste S.C, under the direction of the Consejo Nacional de Ciencia y Tecnología (Mexico), in La Paz, Baja California Sur. CIBNOR
- Centro Interdisciplinario de Ciencias Marinas del Instituto Politécnico Nacional, located in La Paz, Baja California Sur. CICIMAR
- El Colegio de la Frontera Sur, in Chetumal, Quintana Roo on the Yucatán Peninsula, under the direction of the Consejo Nacional de Ciencia y Tecnología (Mexico). ECOSUR
- Ensenada Center for Scientific Research and Higher Education on the Pacific Coast of the Baja Peninsula. CICESE
- National Autonomous University of Mexico, Instituto de Ciencias del Mar y Limnología, campuses in México City, Mazatlán and Puerto Morelos. ICMYL
- Universidad del Mar, Puerto Ángel, Oaxaca UMAR
- University of Colima, Facultad de Ciencias Marinas. FACIMAR

=== Monaco ===
- Institut océanographique, associated with the organization of the same name in Paris, France. Oceano

=== Netherlands ===
- Royal Netherlands Institute for Sea Research on the island of Texel, and in Yerseke. NIOZ
- Utrecht University, Institute for Marine and Atmospheric research Utrecht (IMAU), Oceans and Climate program
- University of Groningen, program in Marine Biology. RUG Marine Biology

=== New Zealand ===
- Cawthron Institute in Nelson on the South Island. Cawthron
- National Institute of Water and Atmospheric Research, whose head office is in Auckland but with several other sites across New Zealand, was formerly part of the N.Z. Oceanographic Institute. NIWA
- Victoria University Coastal Ecology Laboratory on the Wellington coast of the North Island. WUCEL

=== Norway ===
- Geophysical Institute, University of Bergen.
- Norwegian Institute of Marine Research in Bergen.
- Norwegian Polar Institute in Tromsø.
- University of Tromsø’s Norwegian College of Fishery Science and Department of Arctic and Marine Biology.

=== Pakistan ===
- Lasbela University of Agriculture, Water & Marine Science, Balochistan. LUAWMS
- National Institute of Oceanography, part of the Ministry of Science and Technology. NIOPK

=== Philippines ===
- Marine Science Institute, part of the University of the Philippines, UP Diliman, in Quezon City. MSI

=== Poland ===
- Institute of Oceanology, Polish Academy of Sciences, Sopok. IO PAN
- National Marine Fisheries Research Institute, Gdynia. MIR
- University of Gdańsk, Institute of Oceanography. UG Oceanography
- Maritime Institute in Gdańsk. IM GDA
- Polish Polar Station, Hornsund in Svalbard in the Arctic Ocean.

=== Portugal ===
- Centre of Marine Sciences in Faro. CCMAR
- Hydrographic Institute in Lisbon. Instituto Hidrografico
- Department of Oceanography and Fisheries, University of Azores in Horta, Faial.
- Interdisciplinary Centre of Marine and Environmental Research in Matosinhos. CIIMAR
- Marine Biology Station of Funchal on the island of Madeira.
- Marine and Environmental Sciences Centre, a multi-university collaboration. MARE

=== Russia ===
- Marine Hydrophysical Institute, Russian Academy of Sciences. MHI
- Nikolai M. Knipovich Polar Research Institute of Marine Fisheries and Oceanography in Murmansk
- Russian State Hydrometeorological University in St. Petersburg
- Saint Petersburg State University, Department of Oceanography
- Shirshov Institute of Oceanology, Russian Academy of Sciences
- Pacific Oceanological Institute, Far-Eastern Branch, Russian Acad. of Sciences, Vladivostok

=== South Africa ===
- South African Association for Marine Biological Research in KwaZulu-Natal. SAAMBR
- Department of Oceanography, University of Cape Town

=== South Korea ===
- Korea Institute of Ocean Science and Technology. KIOST
- Pusan National University, Department of Oceanography.
- Seoul National University, School of Earth and Environmental Sciences.

=== Spain ===
- Andalusian Center for Marine Science and Technology, sponsored by the University of Cádiz. CACYTMAR
- Institute of Marine Science of Andalusia. ICMAN
- Marine Research units of AZTI, located in multiple cities in the Basque region. AZTI
- Marine Sciences Institute in Barcelona. ICM
- Marine Technology Unit, part of the Spanish National Research Council. UTM
- Oceanic Platform of the Canary Islands. PLOCAN
- Spanish Institute of Oceanology, Madrid. IEO

=== Sri Lanka ===
- National Aquatic Resources Research and Development Agency. NARA
- Ocean University of Sri Lanka in Colombo.
- University of Ruhuna, Faculty of Fisheries and Marine Sciences & Technology. FMST

=== Sweden ===
- Baltic Sea Science Center, Skansen, Stockholm.
- Stockholm University’s Baltic Sea Centre, based in Stockholm but with a laboratory in Asko. Baltic Sea Centre
- Swedish Maritime Robotics Centre, Stockholm. SMaRC
- University of Gothenburg, Department of Marine Sciences, including Kristineberg Marine Research Station and Tjärnö Marine Laboratory. Marina Vetenskaper

=== Taiwan ===
- China Maritime Institute in Taipei City. Maritime Institute
- National Academy of Marine Research in Kaohsiung.
- National Dong Hwa University, Graduate Institute of Marine Biology. NDHU IMB
- National Sun Yat-sen University, College of Marine Sciences. Marine NSYSU
- National Taiwan Normal University, Institute of Marine Environmental Science and Technology. NTNU
- National Taiwan Ocean University in Zhongzheng, Keelung. NTOU
- National Taiwan University, Institute of Oceanography. NTU OC
- Taiwan Ocean Research Institute, Kaohsiung. TORI

=== Tanzania ===
- Western Indian Ocean Marine Science Association, headquartered in Zanzibar.

=== Turkey ===
- Dokuz Eylül University, Institute of Marine Sciences and Technology, Izmir. DEU
- Institute of Marine Sciences, part of Middle East Technical University, Erdemli and Mersin. IMS
- Istanbul University, Institute of Marine Sciences and Management. Deniz Bilimleri
- Office of Navigation, Hydrography and Oceanography, part of the Turkish Navy. ONHO

=== United Kingdom ===
- Bangor University, School of Ocean Sciences. Ocean Sciences
- British Oceanographic Data Centre in Liverpool. BODC
- Challenger Society for Marine Science, a learned society.
- FSC Millport, formerly known as the University Marine Biological Station Millport, on the Firth of Clyde, Scotland.
- Dove Marine Laboratory in North Shields, associated with Newcastle University.
- Gatty Marine Laboratory, associated with the University of St. Andrews, Scotland.
- Marine Biological Association of the United Kingdom, Plymouth, Devon.
- Marine Scotland Directorate, formerly called Marine Scotland Science, headquartered in Leith, Edinburgh.
- Met Office Hadley Centre, Exeter. Met Office
- MLA College, Brisbane
- National Oceanography Centre including the National Oceanography Centre, Southampton.
- National Tidal and Sea Level Facility, including the UK National Tide Gauge Network. NTSLF
- Plymouth Marine Laboratory in Devon.
- Proudman Oceanographic Laboratory in Liverpool.
- Scott Polar Research Institute, Cambridge. SPRI
- Scottish Association for Marine Science, Dunstaffnage, Oban. SAMS

=== United States ===
==== National agencies and non-profit organizations ====
- Integrated Ocean Observing System, a network of regional observing systems.
- Long Beach Marine Institute, non-profit marine science education and conservation organization in California
- Ocean Observatories Initiative, a collaboration between WHOI, OSU, UW, and Rutgers.
- NASA Goddard Space Flight Center’s Ocean Biology and Biogeochemistry Program
- National Data Buoy Center
- National Oceanic and Atmospheric Administration, within which there are several affiliate “joint” programs co-hosted by other institutions.
- National Undersea Research Program
- Naval Oceanographic Office, Stennis Space Center, Mississippi, also home to the Naval Meteorology and Oceanography Command. NAVOCEANO
- Schmidt Ocean Institute
- Sea Education Association, also known as SEA Semester. SEA
- University-National Oceanographic Laboratory System. UNOLS

==== Universities with oceanography programs ====
Northeast:

- Bigelow Laboratory for Ocean Sciences in Maine. Bigelow
- University of Maine, School of Marine Sciences based in Orono and the Downeast Institute at the Machias campus.
- Lamont–Doherty Earth Observatory associated with Columbia University in Palisades, New York.
- Marine Biological Laboratory in Woods Hole, Massachusetts, associated with the University of Chicago. MBL
- Northeastern University, Marine Science Center, East Point, Nahant, Massachusetts. Marine Science Center
- Stony Brook University, School of Marine and Atmospheric Sciences, on Long Island, New York State. SoMAS
- Princeton University’s Geophysical Fluid Dynamics Laboratory, New Jersey.
- Rutgers University, Department of Marine and Coastal Sciences, is based in New Brunswick, New Jersey with other marine science field stations in New Jersey.
- University of Connecticut, Department of Marine Sciences, at the Avery Point campus near Groton, Connecticut, also host to the National Undersea Research Center for the North Atlantic and Great Lakes. DMS
- Woods Hole Oceanographic Institution on Cape Cod, Massachusetts. WHOI
- University of Delaware, College of Earth, Ocean and Environment, which has a campus in Lewes, Delaware. CEOE
- University of Massachusetts Dartmouth, School for Marine Science & Technology. SMAST
- University of New Hampshire’s School of Marine Science and Ocean Engineering, Center for Coastal & Ocean Mapping, and Shoals Marine Laboratory.
- University of New England (United States) has programs in marine science at the Biddeford, Maine campus. Marine Programs.
- University of Rhode Island’s Graduate School of Oceanography, also has a Center for Ocean Exploration and Archaeological Oceanography.

Southeast:

- Duke University Marine Laboratory near Beaufort, North Carolina. Duke Marine Lab
- Halmos College of Natural Sciences and Oceanography at Nova Southeastern University, Florida.
- Harbor Branch Oceanographic Institution at Florida Atlantic University in Fort Pierce, Florida. HBOI
- Florida Institute of Technology, School of Marine and Environmental Technology in Melbourne, Florida.
- Florida State University, Department of Earth, Ocean & Atmospheric Science in Tallahassee and Coastal Marine Laboratory in St. Teresa. EOAS
- Old Dominion University, department of Ocean & Earth Sciences, Norfolk, Virginia. OES
- Rosenstiel School of Marine, Atmospheric, and Earth Science, University of Miami, Florida. RSMAS
- Skidaway Institute of Oceanography, Georgia. SKIO
- University of Georgia Marine Institute on Sapelo Island. UGAMI
- University of North Carolina at Wilmington, Center for Marine Science. UNCW CMS
- University of South Carolina, School of the Earth, Ocean and Environment headquartered in Columbia, South Carolina, as well as the Baruch Institute, a research station near Georgetown, South Carolina. SEOE
- Virginia Institute of Marine Science, located in Gloucester Point, Virginia, part of William & Mary. VIMS
- Whitney Laboratory for Marine Bioscience, part of the University of Florida, in Saint Augustine. Whitney Laboratory

Gulf Coast:

- Dauphin Island Sea Lab on the barrier island where Fort Gaines is located, part of the University of South Alabama. DISL
- Florida Institute of Oceanography, housed at the University of South Florida St. Petersburg. FIO
- Louisiana State University, College of the Coast & Environment. CCE
- Texas A&M University, Department of Oceanography, based in College Station, Texas but with a campus in Galveston, Texas. TAMU Oceanography
- University of Southern Mississippi, School of Ocean Science and Engineering, with locations in Long Beach, Ocean Springs, and the Stennis Space Center. SOSE
- University of Texas Marine Science Institute in Port Aransas, Texas. UTMSI

West Coast:

- Cal Poly Humboldt, Marine Sciences program, Arcata, California. Humboldt Marine Sciences
- Center for the Blue Economy in Monterey, California, managed by the Middlebury Institute of International Studies.
- Hawaii Pacific University in Honolulu and Kaneohe, Hawaii.
- Hatfield Marine Science Center in Newport, Oregon is operated by Oregon State University, College of Earth, Ocean, and Atmospheric Sciences. CEOAS
- Hopkins Marine Station, run by Stanford University, in Monterey, California. Hopkins
- Monterey Bay Aquarium Research Institute in Monterey, California. MBARI
- Moss Landing Marine Laboratories, run by the California State University system, in Moss Landing, California. MLML
- Naval Postgraduate School, Monterey, California. NPS
- Pacific Marine Environmental Laboratory, part of NOAA, split between Newport, Oregon and Seattle, Washington. PMEL
- San Diego State University operates the Coastal Waters Laboratory in San Diego, California.
- Scripps Institution of Oceanography, associated with the University of California San Diego, in La Jolla, California. Scripps
- Southern California Marine Institute, a multi-campus research station on Terminal Island in the Los Angeles area.
- University of Alaska Fairbanks, College of Fisheries and Ocean Sciences, which also houses the Cooperative Institute for Arctic Research, is based in Fairbanks, Alaska and also has a small station in Seward, Alaska. CFOS
- University of California Davis, Coastal and Marine Sciences Institute, which also runs the Bodega Marine Laboratory and Bodega Marine Reserve in Sonoma County, California. UCDavis Marine Science
- University of California Santa Barbara, Marine Science Institute. UCSB MSI
- University of California Santa Cruz Coastal Science Campus, Institute of Marine Sciences. UCSC IMS
- University of Hawaii at Manoa’s School of Ocean and Earth Science and Technology houses the Center for Microbial Oceanography: Research and Education and the Hawaii Undersea Research Laboratory. SOEST
- University of Washington, School of Oceanography, Seattle, Washington. UW Ocean
- Western Washington University, Shannon Point Marine Center, Anacortes, Washington. SPMC

Inland and Great Lakes:

- National Center for Atmospheric Research, Boulder, Colorado.
- University Corporation for Atmospheric Research, Boulder, Colorado.
- University of Colorado Boulder, which houses the Cooperative Institute for Research in Environmental Sciences and the Institute of Arctic and Alpine Research.
- University of Michigan, Department of Earth and Environmental Sciences, Oceanography program. U-M

=== Venezuela ===
- Oceanographic Institute of Venezuela in Cumana.

=== Vietnam ===
- Institute of Marine Environment and Resources in Haiphong, part of the Vietnam Academy of Science and Technology. IMER
- Institute of Marine Geology and Geophysics in Hanoi, part of the Vietnam Academy of Science and Technology. IMGG
- International Centre for Interdisciplinary Science and Education in Quy Nhon, Binh Dinh. ICISE
- Nha Trang Oceanography Institute in Khánh Hòa Province. VNIO
- University of Science and Technology of Hanoi, Water-Earth-Environment Program. WEO

== See also ==
- Category:Oceanographic organizations
- Category:Fisheries and aquaculture research institutes
- Earth science
- List of environmental research institutes
- List of research vessels by country
- Oceanography
- Outline of Earth sciences
- Outline of oceanography
