= Stann Creek =

Stann Creek can refer to:

- Stann Creek District, Belize
  - Dangriga (formerly known as Stann Creek Town), a town in Stann Creek District, Belize
- North Stann Creek, a river in southeastern Belize
- South Stann Creek, a river in southeastern Belize
