= Institut océanographique de Paris =

Oceanographic institution in Paris

Oceanographic Institute of Paris
- Institut océanographique de Paris
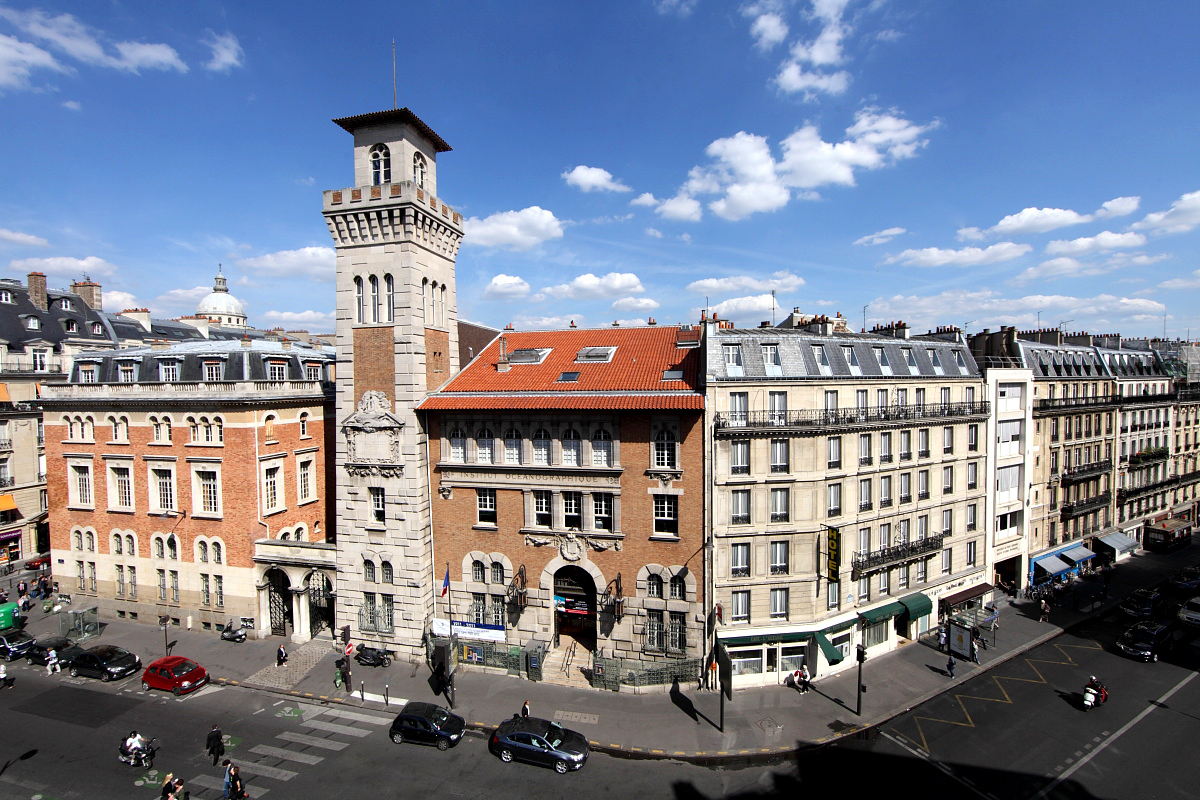
- Interactive map of the Oceanographic Institute of Paris area

General information
- Architectural style: Renaissance Revival
- Location: 195 Rue Saint-Jacques, Paris, France
- Coordinates: 48°50′40″N 2°20′32″E
- Construction started: 1908
- Completed: 1911

Design and construction
- Architect: Henri-Paul Nénot
- Designations: Monument historique

Website
- www.oceano.mc/en

The Institut océanographique de Paris (French pronunciation: [ɛ̃stity ɔseanɔɡʁafik də paʁi], lit. 'Oceanographic Institute of Paris'), is an oceanographic institution founded in 1906 by Albert I, Prince of Monaco, which also includes the Oceanographic Museum of Monaco. The building was designated as a Monument historique in 2004. In 2011, for the 100 year anniversary, it was renamed the Maison de l'Océan.

== History ==
=== Origin ===
The organization's founder, Albert I, Prince of Monaco, wanted to spread his knowledge and interest in oceanography, and as early as 1903 began teaching classes of the subject at the Conservatoire national des arts et métiers. The classes were successful, and led to the creation of the Oceanographic Institute in Paris, as well as the formation of the Institut océanographique organization in 1906.

=== Construction ===
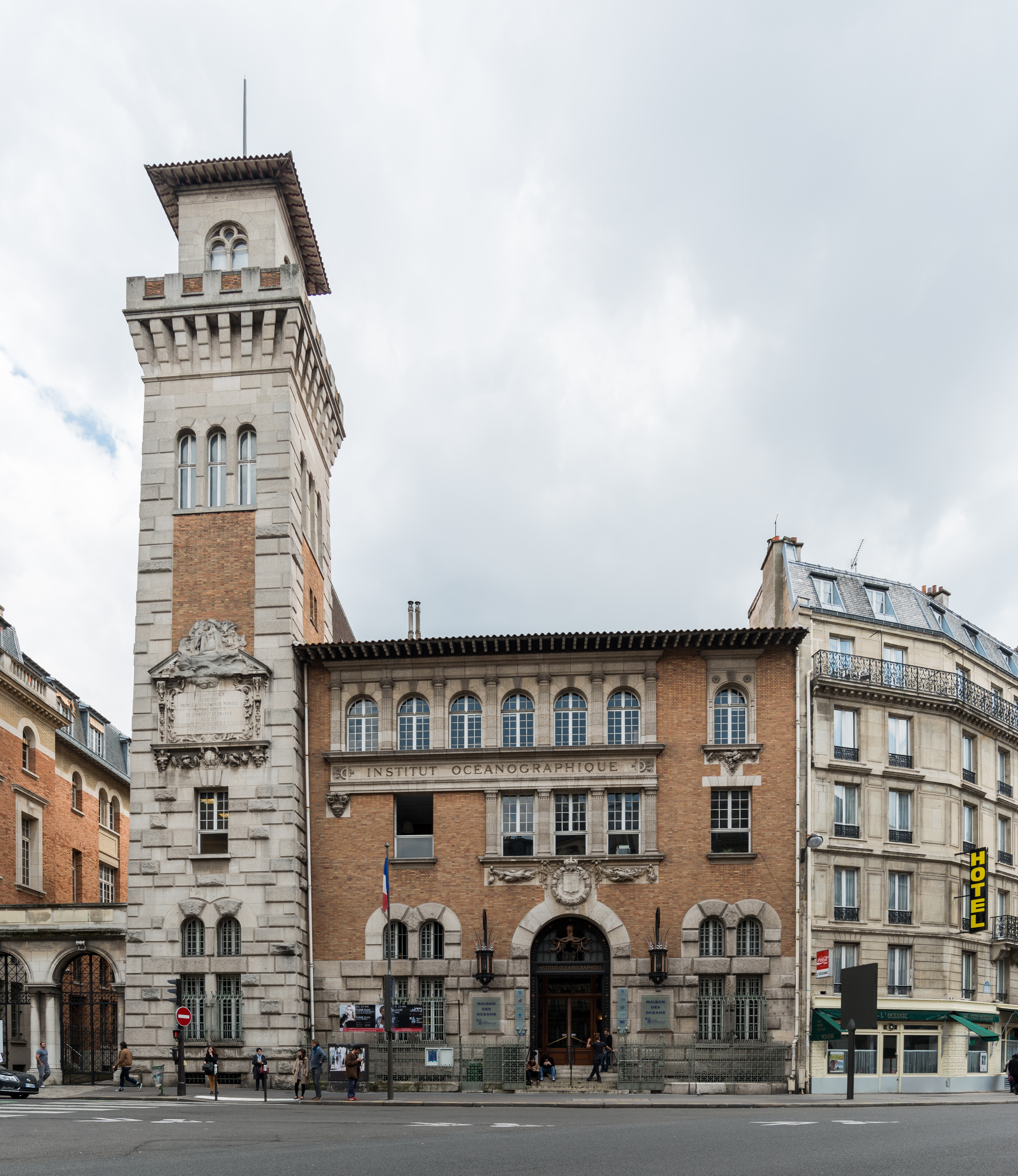
View of the facade

The oceanographic institute was built in 1908 and completed in 1911. It is located in the 5th arrondissement of Paris near the Latin Quarter, on the corner of Rue Saint-Jacques and Rue Gay-Lussac, in the "Campus Curie", which includes other scientific institutions.

The building was designed by architect Henri-Paul Nénot, who also designed the nearby Sorbonne and the neighboring Institute of Geography. The latter is linked by a symbolic double arch (the Earth and the Ocean) to the Oceanographic Institute. The building's style is an Italian Renaissance palace in brick and stone, flanked by a tall square tower, which is similar to many others in the area.

This building includes two amphitheatres, three laboratories corresponding to three courses (physical oceanography, marine biology and physiology of marine biodiversity), a specialized library-media library, breeding grounds in the basement and official accommodation (managerial apartment and caretaker's studio).

== Gallery ==
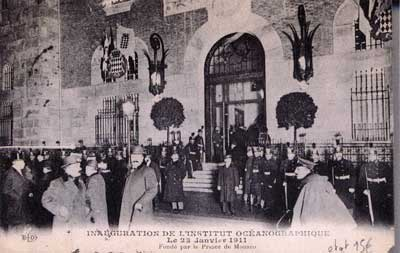
Inauguration of the Institute in 1911

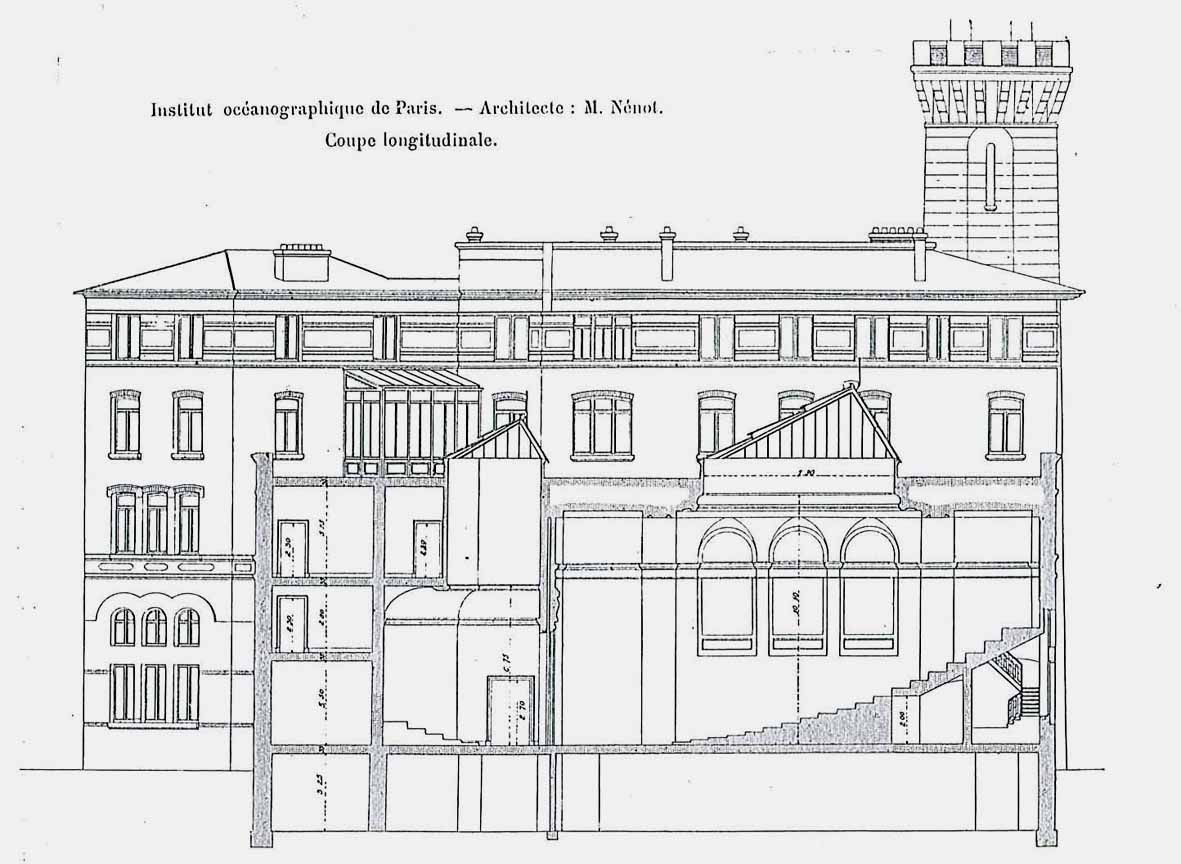
Sectional plan of the Oceanographic Institute

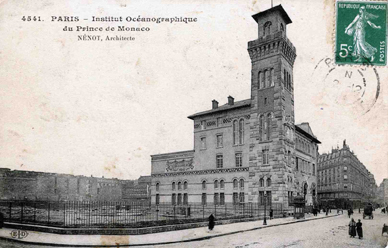
The Institute in 1912

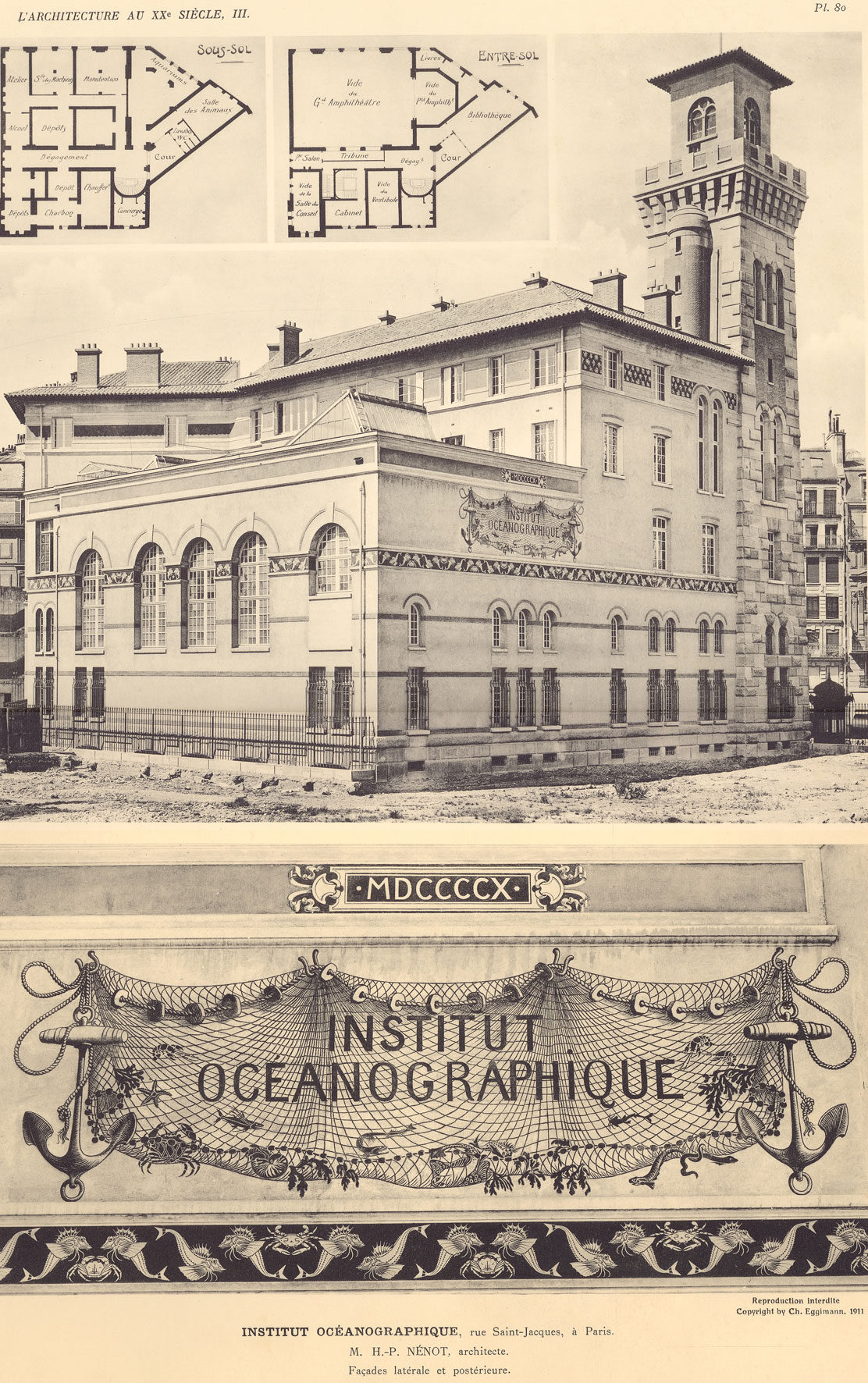
Architectural diagram from the early 20th century
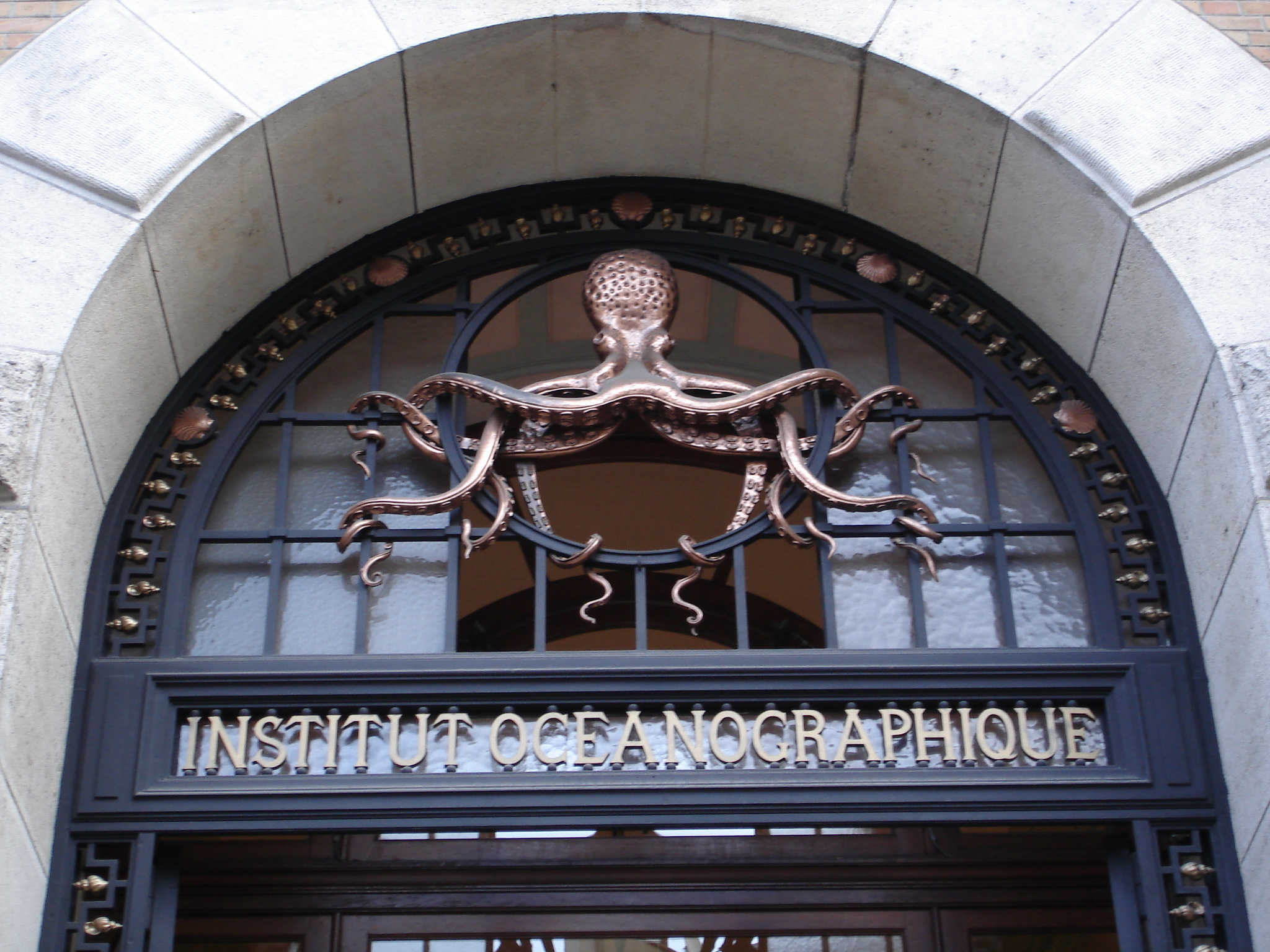
Main entrance door of the Institute

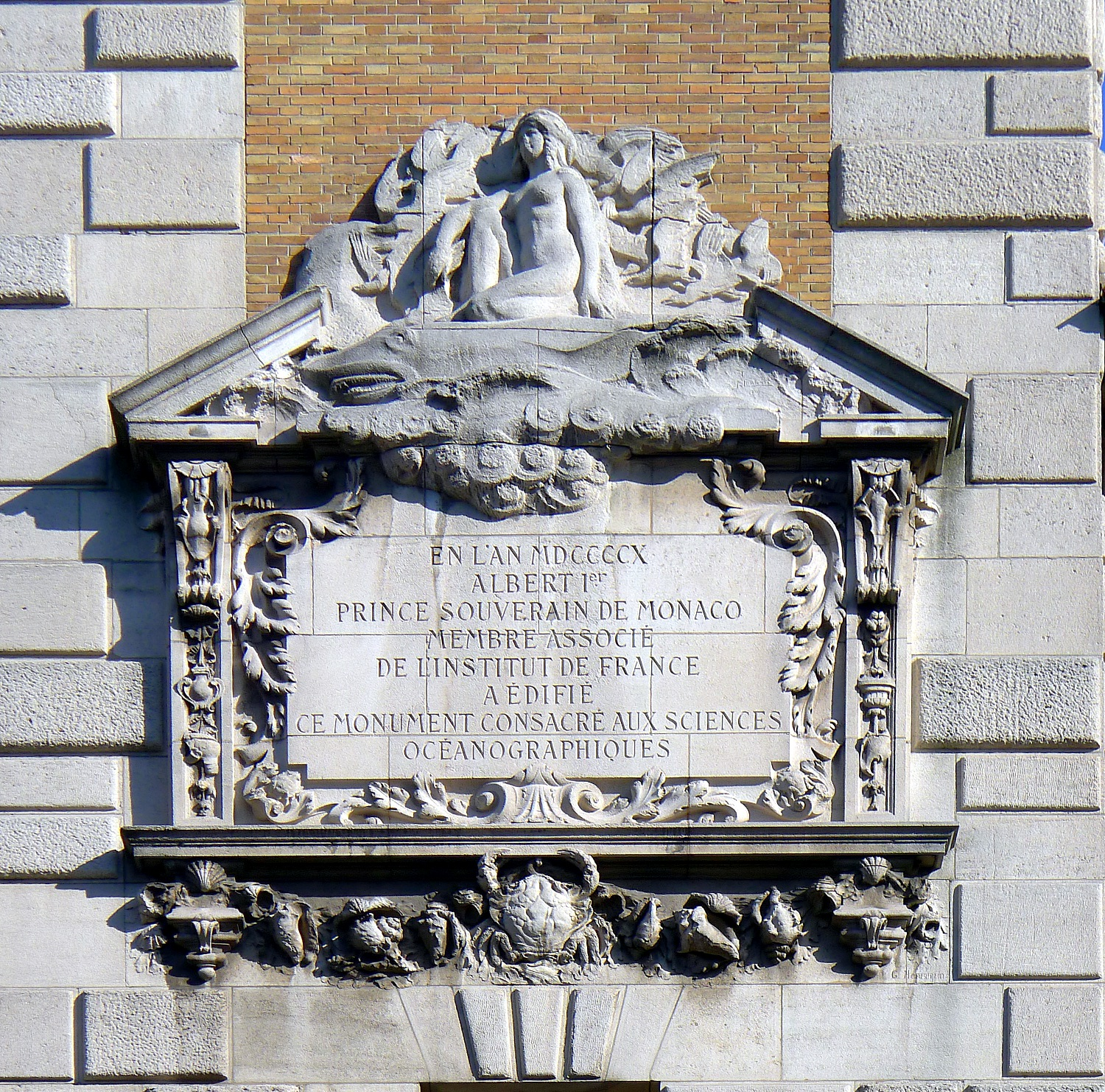
Commemorative text of the construction of the building

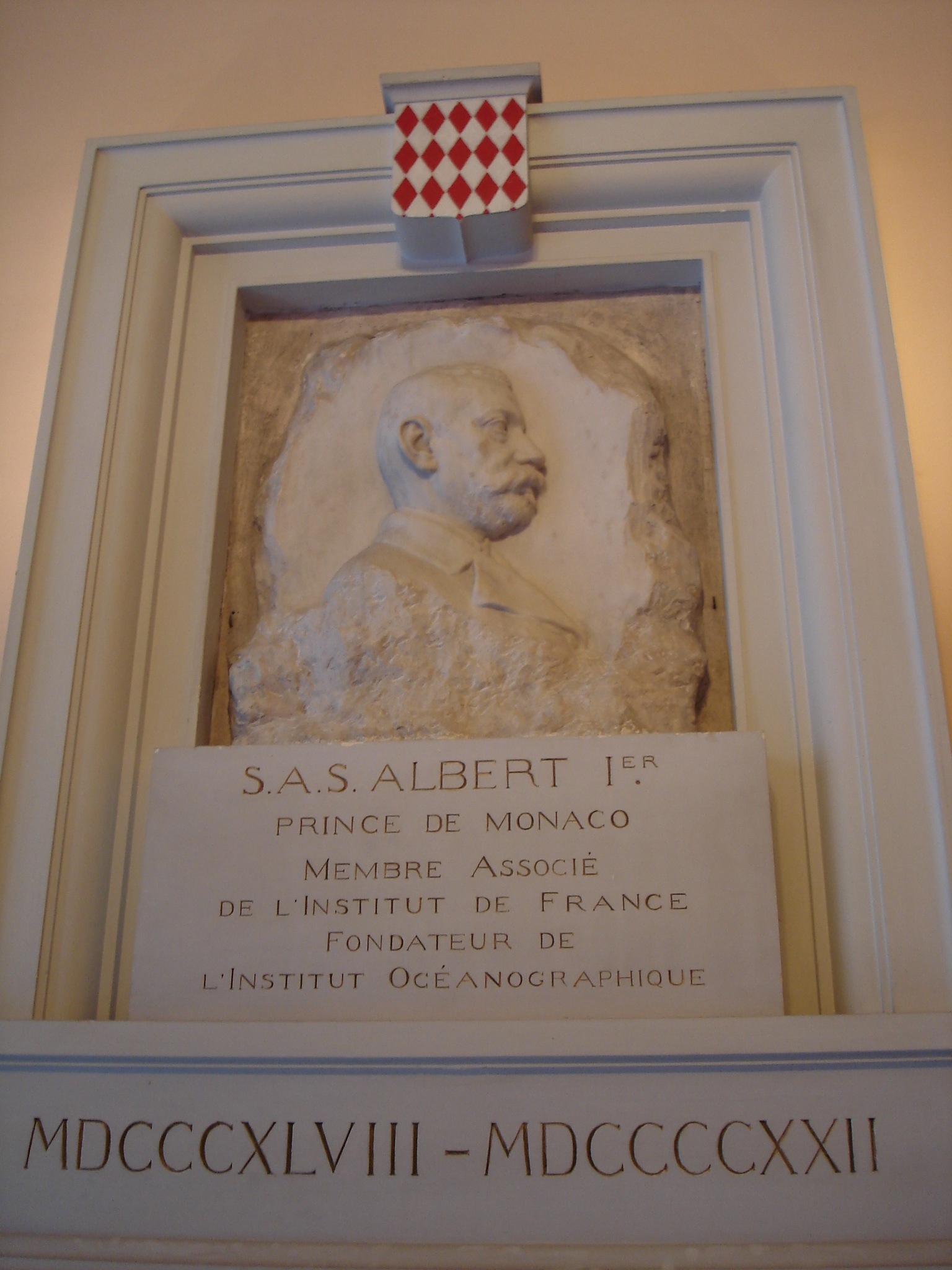
Prince Albert Medallion

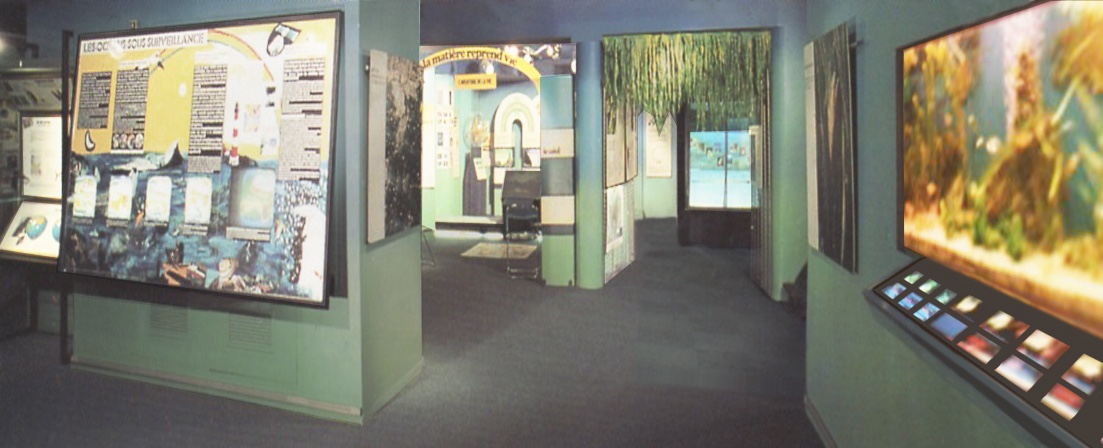
The Center of the Sea and Waters (1977-2010)
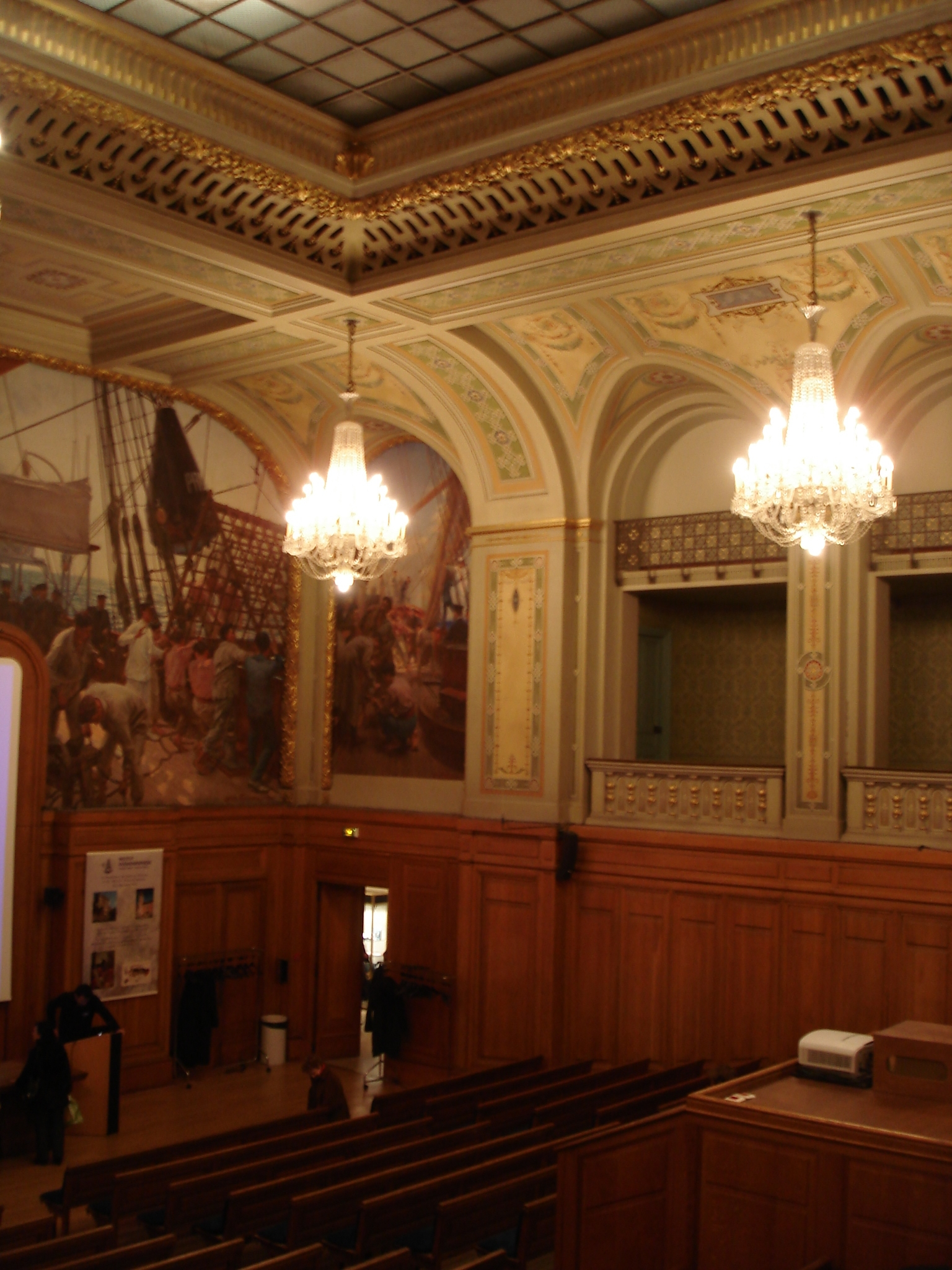
Detail of the golds of the large amphitheater

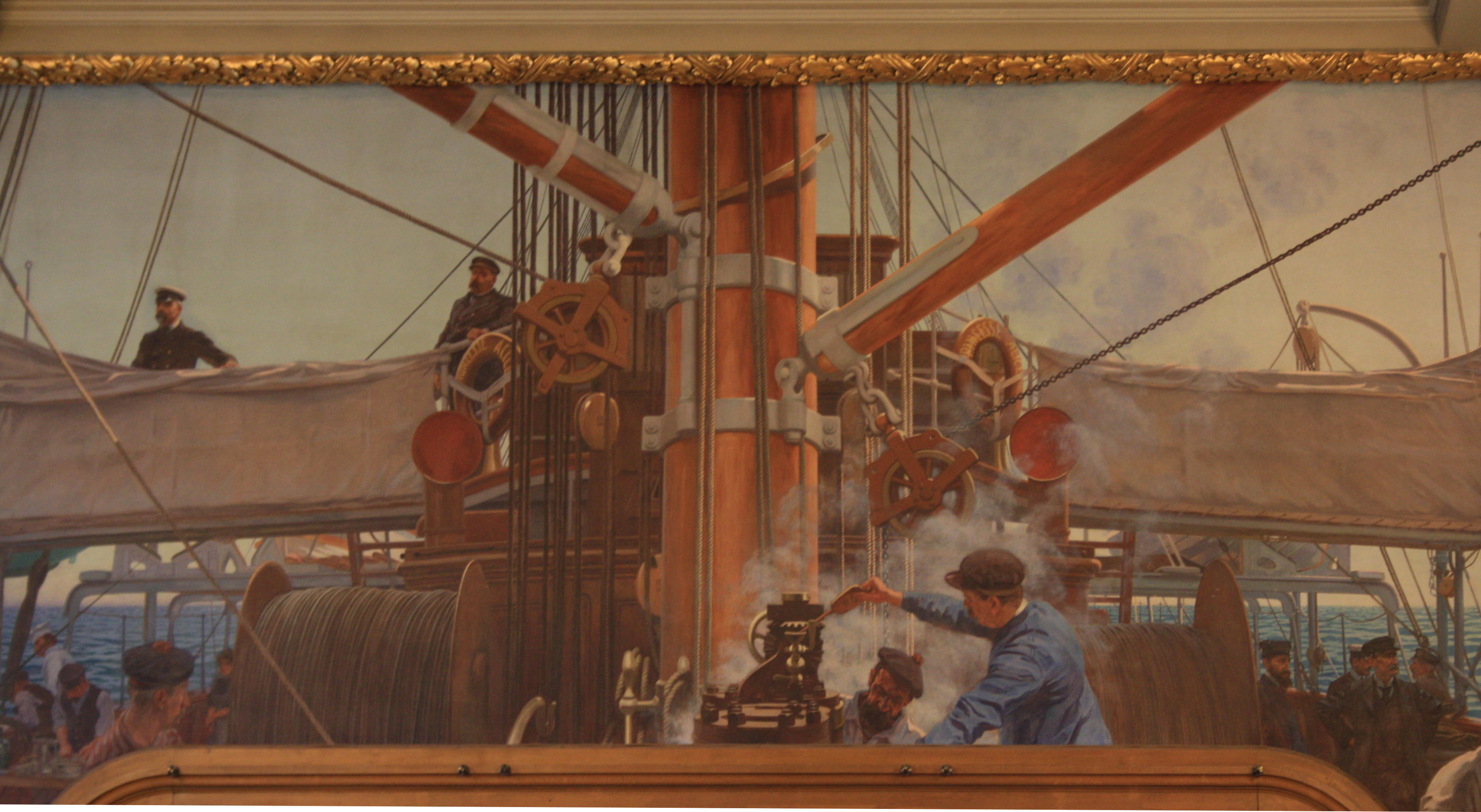
Détail de la fresque du grand amphithéâtre : « sur le Pont de la Princesse Alice »

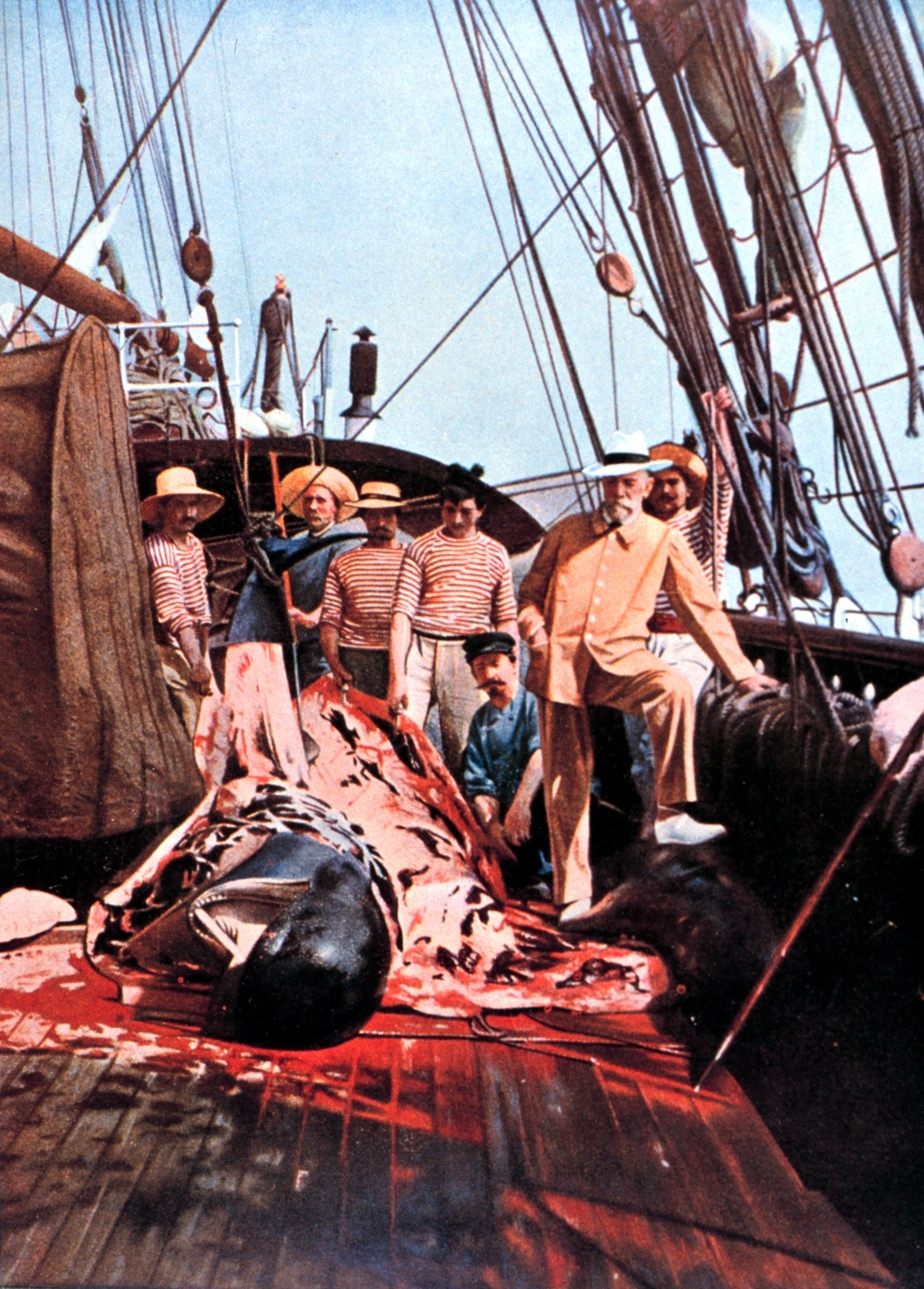
Prince Albert I of Monaco aboard Princess Alice with a butchered whale.

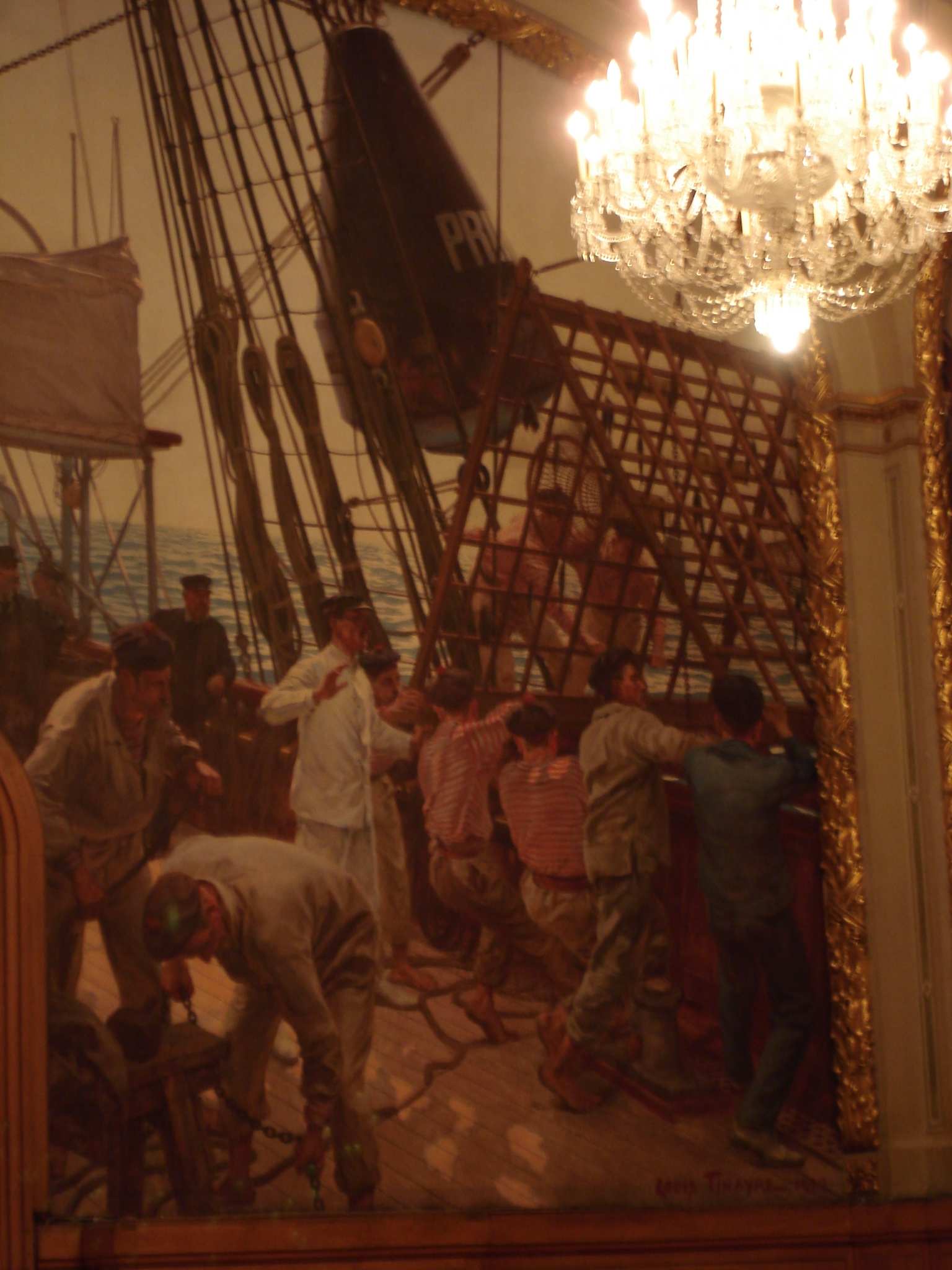
Large mural (detail)

== See also ==
- Les Rencontres Philosophiques de Monaco
- Prince Pierre Foundation
- Oceanography (journal)
- List of oceanographic institutions and programs
