= Santa Cruz, Stann Creek =

Santa Cruz Village
- Village
- Santa Cruz Village
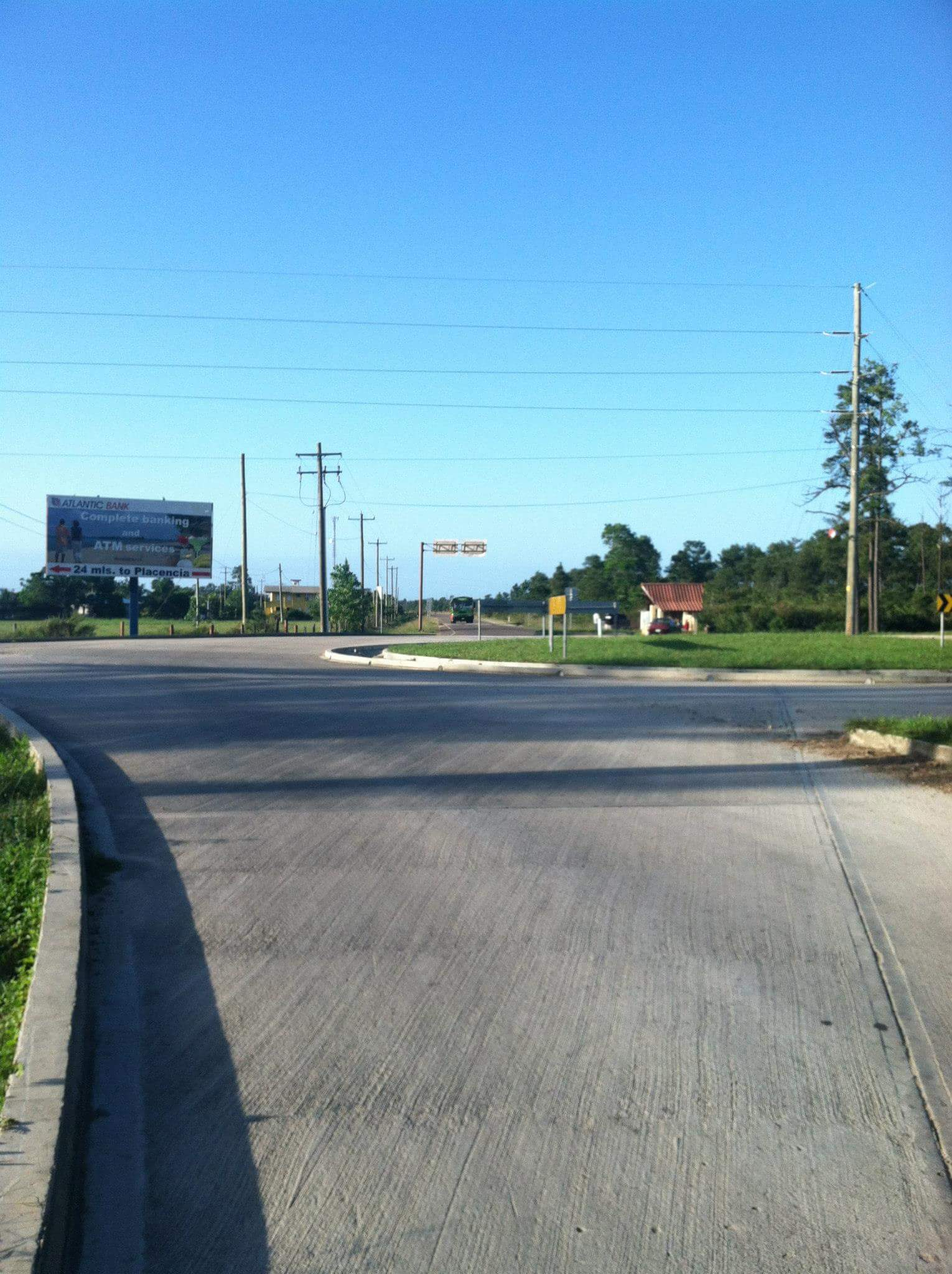

- Location within Belize
- Coordinates: 16°41′53″N 88°25′32″W
- Country: Belize
- District: Stann Creek
- Elevation: 45.76 m (150.1 ft)

Population (2010)
  - Total: 1,200
- Time zone: UTC-6 (Central)
- Climate: Am

Santa Cruz is a village in Stann Creek District, Belize. It is located 24 miles northwest of the Placencia peninsula.

== History ==
The village was formed as a result of the combined efforts of the people who lived in what was called “Old Santa Cruz“, Banana farm workers and Fisherman of the area. “Old Santa Cruz” was made up of a few houses situated about 2 miles north of the Placencia junction on the Southern Highway, it was demolished for the extension of a banana plantation in the year 2005 by a local developer.

What is now Santa Cruz Village, was first settled by various ethnic groups which includes Mestizo, Maya, and Belizean Creole. The origin of the name dates back to the beginning of this New century at the time the village was established.

Many residents of Santa Cruz Village commute for work daily to the nearby Banana Farms (Belize's productive agricultural heartland), Shrimp Farm Factory and also to the popular "The Placencia Peninsula” as it is home to significant tourist destination. Most Santa Cruz's Residents speak Spanish and English very well.

== Etymology ==
Santa Cruz (Santacruz) is originally a Spanish term meaning “Holy Cross” and referring to the cross on which Jesus was crucified. The name was first used by Levi Flores, one of the first settlers of this village, to identify this place and thereafter villagers followed by making it the official name of this village.

== Geography ==
A ten-minute drive from Santa Cruz Village lies the Maya King Waterfalls, bounded by the Maya Mountains to the west and The Caribbean Sea to the east. The Cockscomb Basin Wildlife Sanctuary is a notable nature reserve within the range. It is also bordered by Santa Rosa Village to the south and Riversdale to the southeast.

During dusk or on a day that is not overcast, Belize's highest peak, Victoria Peak, can be seen from Santa Cruz over the Maya Mountains in the horizon. The most prominent river within the skirts of Santa Cruz Village is the South Stann Creek River, which drains from the Maya Mountains and flows to the Caribbean Sea.
