= All Pines =

- Ghost town
- Location within Belize
- Coordinates: 16°47.5′N 88°18′W
- Country: Belize
- District: Stann Creek District

All Pines was a village in the Stann Creek District of Belize. It functioned as a shipping port during the 19th and 20th centuries, supplying pine wood for builders in Belize and other locations along the coast. Cheaper pine wood from the United States led to the decline of All Pines during the mid-20th century, and the village was completely abandoned in the 1960s. In 1946, the population of All Pines, including the nearby village of Sittee River, was 538.

In the early 21st century, the area that previously included All Pines was made into a luxury real estate development called Sanctuary Belize, which has since been renamed The Reserve.
