= Henri Paul Nénot =

French architect

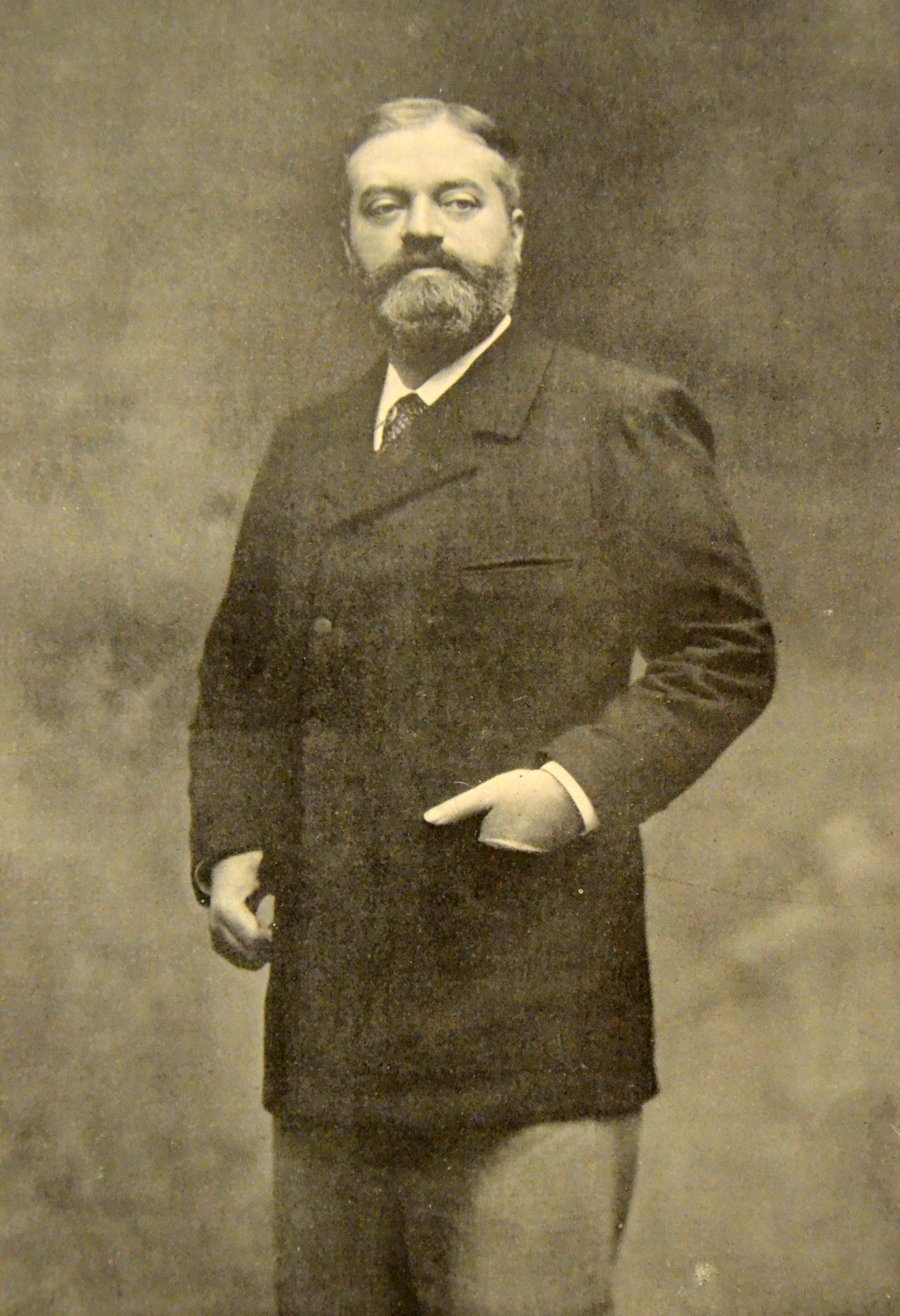
Henri Paul Nénot (c.1900)

Henri Paul Nénot (French: [ɑ̃ʁi pɔl nenɔ]; 27 May 1853 – 1934) was a noted French architect.

== Biography ==
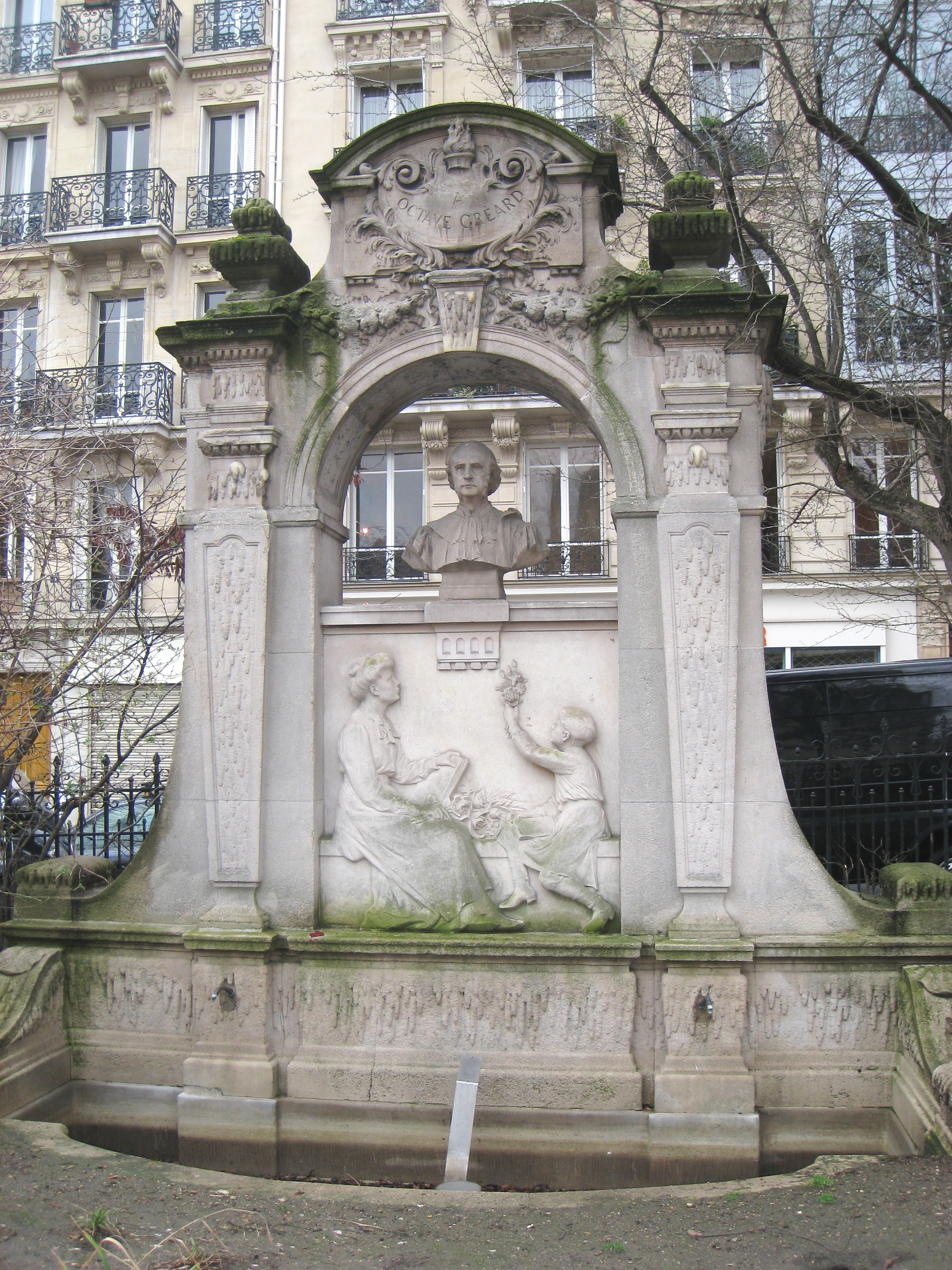
Monument to Octave Gréard, by Henri Paul Nénot

Nénot was born in Paris. After his initial training in an architectural workshop, he entered the studio of Charles-Auguste Questel at the École Nationale Supérieure des Beaux-Arts while also working for various architects, including Charles Garnier. He was in residence at the Villa Medici 1878–1881.

In 1882 Nénot began his career, during which he was appointed architect of the Sorbonne, which remains his great work, as well as designing other university buildings in Paris and a number of private residential and commercial buildings. In 1895 he was elected department chair for architecture in the Académie des beaux-arts. His last position was Director General for the architecture of the Palace of Nations in Geneva, where he died in an accident.

== Principal works ==
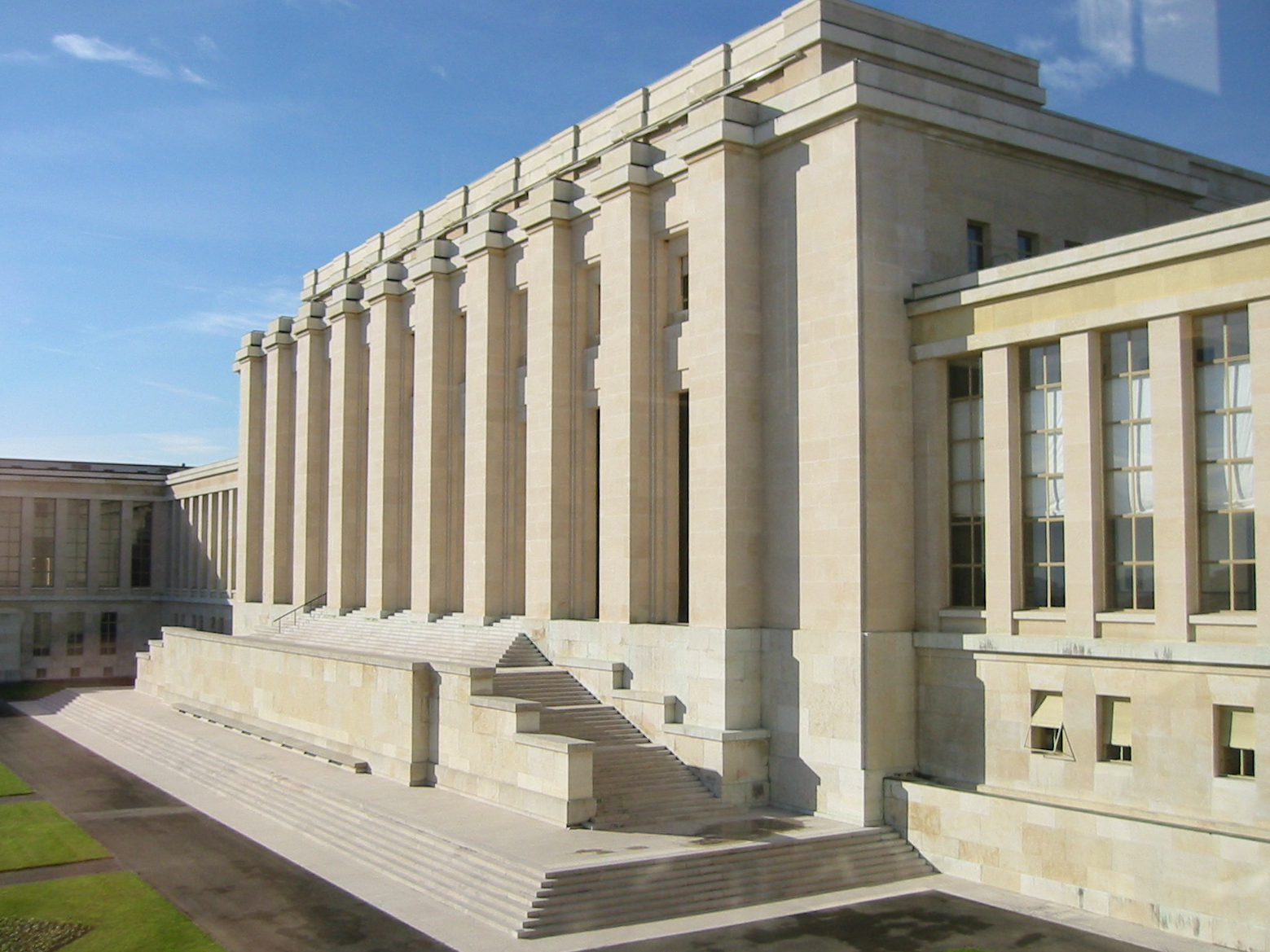
Palace of Nations in Geneva

- 1875: école normale d'Huy in Belgium, with sculptor Eugène André Oudiné
- 1882–1901: new Sorbonne, 5th arrondissement
- 1887: tomb of Mlle Labiche in the cemetery of Béville-le-Comte
- 1888: building for M. Quettier at Lorient
- 1891: building for MM. Labiche and Gréard, rue Guynemer, 6th arrondissement
- 1893: house for M. Richardot at Charenton-le-Pont
- 1896: monument to commandant Rolland at Bourget
- 1900: monument to Victor Duruy, avenue Rey in Villeneuve-Saint-Georges (Val-de-Marne)
- 1900: hôtel Blumenthal-Montmorency, 34 avenue Foch, 16th arrondissement
- 1905: headquarters of the Banque Louis-Dreyfus, 4 rue de la banque, 2nd arrondissement
- 1907: hôtel Meurice, 238 rue de Rivoli, 1st arrondissement
- 1909: monument to Octave Gréard sq. Paul-Painlevé, 5th arrondissement with sculptor Jules-Clément Chaplain
- 1910–1926: Institut de chimie, now École nationale supérieure de chimie de Paris, 5th arrondissement
- 1911: Institut océanographique, 195, rue Saint-Jacques, 5th arrondissement
- 1911-1913: Headquarters of the Suez Canal Company at 1, rue d'Astorg in Paris
- 1914–1926: Institut de géographie, 5th arrondissement
- 1921: building for Dreyfus, 410 Av. Alem, Buenos Aires
- 1922–1928: Place Carnegie de Fargniers, now commune de Tergnier (Aisne) with Paul Bigot (an ensemble comprising la mairie, un bureau de poste, un poste de police, une pompe, une halle, une salle d' assemblée, le foyer Carnegie, un établissement de bains, des écoles, des espaces verts et de jeux) (inscrit MH)
- 1925: monument to the war dead 1914–1918 in the Gassin cemetery (Var)
- 1930: Le Paladium bd du Tsarévitch at Nice with Edmond Labbé
- 1931–1937: Palace of Nations of the League of Nations at Geneva with Julien Flegenheimer, Camille Lefèvre, Carlo Broggi and Jozsef Vago
