= Andalusian Center for Marine Science and Technology =

Spanish research institute

The Andalusian Center for Marine Science and Technology (Spanish: Centro Andaluz de Ciencia y Tecnología Marina, CACYTMAR) is a joint institute of investigation sponsored by the University of Cádiz and the Andalusian Council for Education and Science (Consejería de Educación y Ciencia de la Junta de Andalucía). It was created as an outcome of the II Plan Andaluz de Investigación, as one of several thematic regional investigative centers. Although it is linked to a specific university, the objective is to bring together and serve all related institutions in Andalusia, Spain working in the field.

CACYTMAR is organized around five major thematic areas: oceanography, coasts, natural resources, environmental quality, and marine technology. It is the umbrella for approximately 30 investigative projects, most of them financed by the Plan Nacional de I+D+i (National Research and Development Plan), although some are financed by the European Union or by the Andalusian Autonomous Government. There are also about 40 contracts for investigation in cooperation with businesses or other administrations.

Recently four services of CACYTMAR have been put in place: the Service of Oceanographic Support, the Service of Analysis of Nutrients, the Service of Teledetection and Operational Oceanography and the Service of Technological and Scientific Diving.
