= Estação de Biologia Marinha do Funchal =

Portuguese research centre

Coordinates: 32.636649°N 16.935696°W

The Marine Biology Station of Funchal (Portuguese: Estação de Biologia Marinha do Funchal), on the Portuguese island of Madeira, is a research centre owned by the municipality of Funchal and dedicated to research and education on marine sciences. It was inaugurated on 28 September 1999.

The station is an observer member of the European Network of Marine Biology stations (MARS), which has around 60 laboratories in Europe. Also, the station is part of the Portuguese Institute of Marine Research (IMAR). Most of these Institute’s members are Portuguese university research laboratories specialized in marine sciences.

== Objectives ==
Its objectives are to develop the sciences and technologies of the sea, particularly, biology and ecology of coastal and deep sea waters. The station is the base for the Marine Biology team of the Natural History Museum of Funchal and the Marine Biology and Oceanography Laboratory team of the Biology Department of the University of Madeira. These two teams participate in several research projects including the studies of deep sea hydrothermal vent fish, the fish and crustacean diversity of Macaronesian deep waters and the biological migration of sea turtles.

== Location ==
The station occupies a six-floor building just off the promenade between the "Lido" area of Funchal and "O Clube Naval" (The Yacht Club). It has several dry and wet labs, offices, refrigeration and freezing facilities, and other technical areas, including a scientific diving base. The marine reference collections of the Natural History Museum of Funchal are stored at the station as well. This amounts to 25,000 specimens from the Macaronesian waters in the Eastern Atlantic including several holotypes and paratypes. To encourage cooperation and exchange of information among scientists and researchers the station has lodging available for 8 visiting scientists and lab space for them.

== The Professor Luiz Saldanha Library ==
This library within the station holds a large collection, including reference books and periodicals on marine sciences. It is named after the Portuguese oceanographer who was the founder of the ‘Guia Marine Laboratory’ in Lisbon.

== Visiting the station ==
On the last Monday of every month at 10 a.m. and 3 p.m., the station is open to the general public. The station is open from Monday to Friday, from 9:00 to 12:30 a.m. and from 2:00 to 5:30 p.m.. The centre is closed on Saturday, Sunday and Bank Holidays.
