= National Undersea Research Program =

The National Undersea Research Program (NURP) is a U.S. government program that operates six facilities for undersea research, including the world's only permanent undersea research facility, Aquarius. The program is operated under the auspices of the Office of Oceanic and Atmospheric Research, a division of the National Oceanic and Atmospheric Administration (NOAA). Each center is funded by a grant from NOAA. Projects are chosen based upon peer review.

== List of regional centers ==
- National Undersea Research Center for Hawaii and the Western Pacific - University of Hawaii's Hawaii Undersea Research Laboratory (HURL)
- National Undersea Research Center for the West Coast and Polar Regions University of Alaska Fairbanks (UAF) School of Fisheries and Ocean Sciences
- National Undersea Research Center for the North Atlantic and Great Lakes- University of Connecticut, Avery Point
- National Undersea Research Center for the Middle Atlantic Bight - Institute of Marine and Coastal Sciences (IMCS) at Rutgers University, New Brunswick, New Jersey
- National Undersea Research Center for the Southeastern United States and Gulf of Mexico - University of North Carolina at Wilmington
- National Undersea Research Center for the Caribbean - Caribbean Marine Research Center (CMRC), Tequesta, FL
