= National Oceanographic Data Centre of Cameroon =

Oceanographic data institute in Cameroon

The National Oceanographic Data Centre (NODC) is a national institute in Cameroon responsible for compiling, analyzing, and monitoring data related to the country's waters. It is a member of the International Oceanographic Data and Information Exchange System (IODE).

== History ==
The National Oceanographic Data Centre of Cameroon was established on 28 February 2001.

== Aim ==
The centre focuses on:

- Improving oceanographic data and information management
- Data sharing among other African nations and national partner institutions
- Coordinating national institutions involving coastal and marine management

== Structure and governance ==
The centre is under the management of the Institute of Agricultural Research for Development (IRAD) and is based in Kribi. It under CERECOMA, a specialized research centre which operates as a structure of IRAD which is under the Ministry of Scientific Research and Innovation (MINRESI). A National Project Management Committee composed of 10 members was established to coordinate project activities in Cameroon.

== Activities ==
Among the beneficiaries of products and services the centre offers include:

- Port services
- Coastal engineering
- Fisheries services
- Tourism
- Coastal management services
- Scientific research
- University lecturers and students
- Non-governmental organizations (NGOs)
- Civil society
