= National Undersea Research Center for the North Atlantic and Great Lakes =

US research center

The National Undersea Research Center for the North Atlantic and Great Lakes (NURC-NA&GL) is one of six undersea research centers established by the National Oceanic and Atmospheric Administration (NOAA) under its National Undersea Research Program.

The center is co-located with the University of Connecticut’s Department of Marine Sciences and serves as a hub for advancing oceanographic research in the North Atlantic and Great Lakes regions. Its mission includes providing logistical and scientific support for underwater research, promoting sustainable marine resource use, and increasing public awareness of ocean ecosystems through outreach and education initiatives.
