= European Marine Board =

The European Marine Board is a pan-European network comprising national organizations engaged in marine research. Its members include research funding organizations, such as research councils and ministries; research performing organizations like national marine research institutes; and nationally based consortia of higher education institutes, including university consortia.

== Background ==
The European Marine Board (EMB) is a European think tank in marine science policy. The board provides a platform for its member organizations to develop common priorities, to advance marine research, and to bridge the gap between science and policy to meet future marine science challenges and opportunities. Established in 1995, it is a partnership facilitating enhanced cooperation between European organizations involved in marine science towards development of a common vision on the research priorities and strategies for marine science in Europe. It also facilitates enhanced cooperation between stakeholders involved in supporting, delivering and using marine research and technology.

The European Marine Board was established in 1995 as an expert Board of the European Science Foundation (ESF). In 2016, the European Marine Board established its own legal organization as an international non-profit organisation under Belgian law, EMB-IVZW. Eight Founding Members signed the deed in the presence of a Notary Public at a dedicated founding meeting in Brussels on 20 January. EMB-IVZW became fully independent of ESF as of 1 January 2017. The Secretariat of the European Marine Board is based at the InnovOcean site in the harbour of Ostend, Belgium, with office accommodation and support provided by the Flemish Government, through the Flanders Marine Institute (VLIZ).

== Objectives and Activities ==
=== Objectives ===
The European Marine Board aims to provide a collaborative platform for its member organizations across Europe, focusing on developing shared priorities and advancing marine research. It strives to connect scientific insights with policy-making to address future challenges in marine science. The Board facilitates cooperation among European marine science organizations, both in research and funding, to shape a unified vision for marine research in Europe. It also plays a strategic role in advising on marine research policy, contributing to the European Research Area in marine science.

=== Activities ===
The European Marine Board engages in various activities to advance marine science and policy. This includes producing strategic publications such as position papers and policy briefs, organizing significant marine science-policy conferences and events, hosting thematic panels like the Marine Board Communications Panel, participating in strategic EU projects, providing members with ongoing information and advice on European marine science developments, and participating in external stakeholder advisory panels.

== Membership ==
Three kinds of organizations are eligible for Marine Board membership:

- National Research Performing Organizations (e.g. major national marine or oceanographic institutes);
- National Research Funding Organizations (e.g. national research councils and ministries which fund marine research); and
- Consortia of national third-level institutes (membership was opened to this category in 2010 on the basis of agreed criteria included in the Marine Board guidelines)

Membership is open to eligible organizations from countries which are part of the Council of Europe. Membership is restricted to a maximum of four organizations per country.

== Governance ==
The Marine Board comprises three layers of governance:

- The Board
- The Executive Committee
- The Secretariat

=== The Board ===
The Board consists of representatives of the member organizations, each represented by a delegate and an alternate. The Board meets in plenary twice per year in spring and autumn. The Board is the highest level of governance and makes decisions on activities, strategic directions and operational principles of the European Marine Board.

=== The Executive Committee ===
The Executive Committee (ExCom) is composed of the Marine Board Chair, six vice-Chairs and the Executive Director (as ex officio member), who is the Head of the European Marine Board Secretariat. The Chair and vice-Chairs are elected by the Marine Board member organizations. The Chair and vice-Chairs do not represent their organizations at the Marine Board ExCom. They act in the best interest of the Marine Board and its objectives. The ExCom meets 3 times per year to provide oversight and guidance to the Secretariat in implementing ongoing European Marine Board activities and to formulate strategic guidance to the Board on future activities and directions.

=== The Secretariat ===
The Secretariat supports the overall coordination and management of the European Marine Board and implements the decisions and activities approved by the Board and ExCom. Reporting directly to the European Marine Board and ExCom, the Secretariat is responsible for serving as the principal focal point for the European Marine Board member organizations and as a facilitator between the member organizations and the European Commission and other agencies. As a continuous task, the European Marine Board Secretariat monitors marine research and science policy developments, keeping abreast of developments at national, European and global levels. Depending on the level of activity, core Secretariat activities require a minimum team of three Science Officers and an Executive and Finance Officer, under the management of an Executive Director.
