= Departamento de Oceanografia e Pescas =

Coordinates: 38.541737°N 28.627003°W

Department of Oceanography and Fisheries Departamento de Oceanografia e Pescas
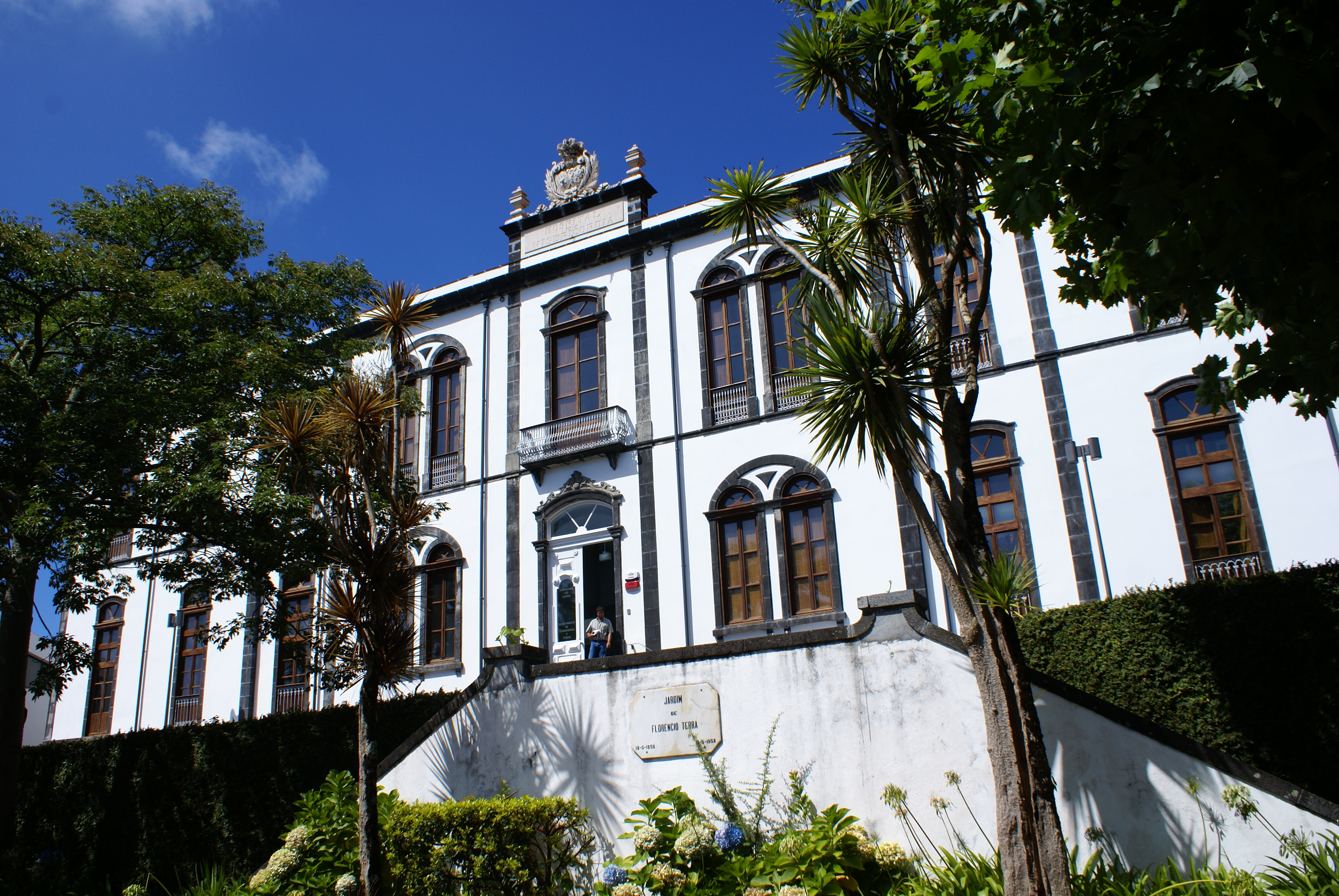
- Headquarters of the Department of Oceanography and Fisheries, the former-Hospital of the Misericórdia
- Established: 1976
- Mission: Scientific knowledge, conservation of marine life and the sustainable use of the Atlantic Ocean in the Azores
- Focus: Marine Ecology and Biodiversity (MEBS); Fisheries Resources; Oceanography; Chemistry
- Chair: Eduardo José Louçã Florêncio Isidro
- Head: Helder Guerreiro Marques da Silva
- Members: 60
- Owner: University of the Azores
- Formerly called: Instituto Universitário dos Açores
- Address: Hospital da Misericórdia
- Location: Matriz, Horta, Faial, Portugal
- Website: http://www.horta.uac.pt/

The Department of Oceanography and Fisheries (Portuguese: Departamento de Oceanografia e Pescas), normally shortened to DOP/UAç, is an Azorean oceanographic institute and research arm of the University of the Azores, with its seat in the city of Horta, on the island of Faial.

== History ==
DOP was created in 1976, under the Instituto Universitário dos Açores (University Institute of the Azores), with its seat in the city of Horta. It became one of the organic units of the University of the Azores head-quartered on the island of Faial. Since its founding, DOP assumed "the role of scientific research, conservation of marine life and sustainable use of Atlantic Ocean in the region of the Azores".

== Scope ==
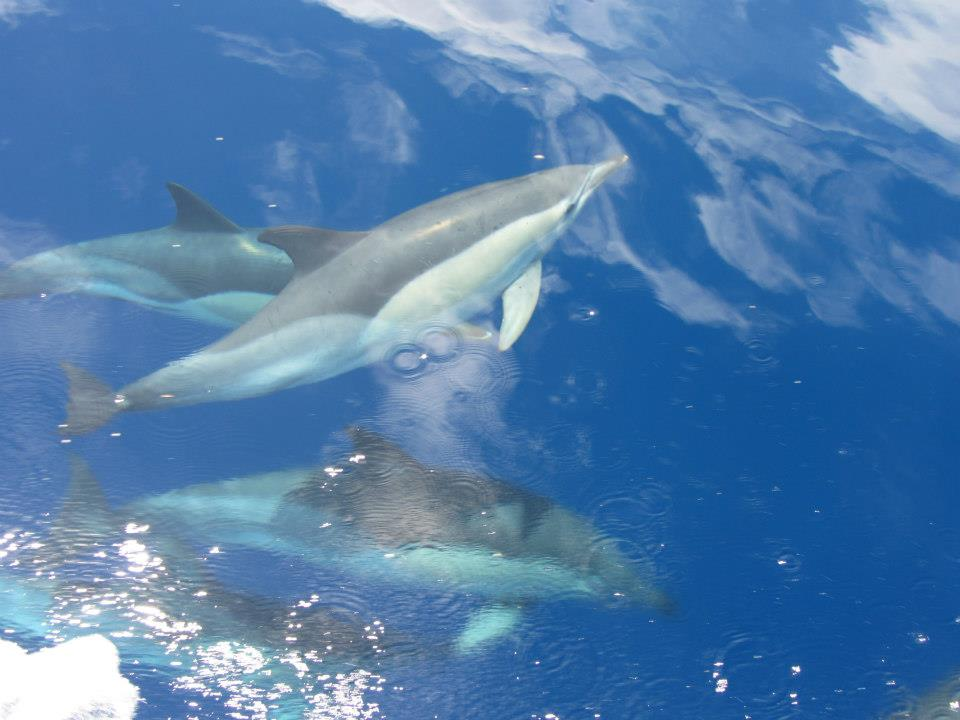
Dolphins in the waters of São Miguel

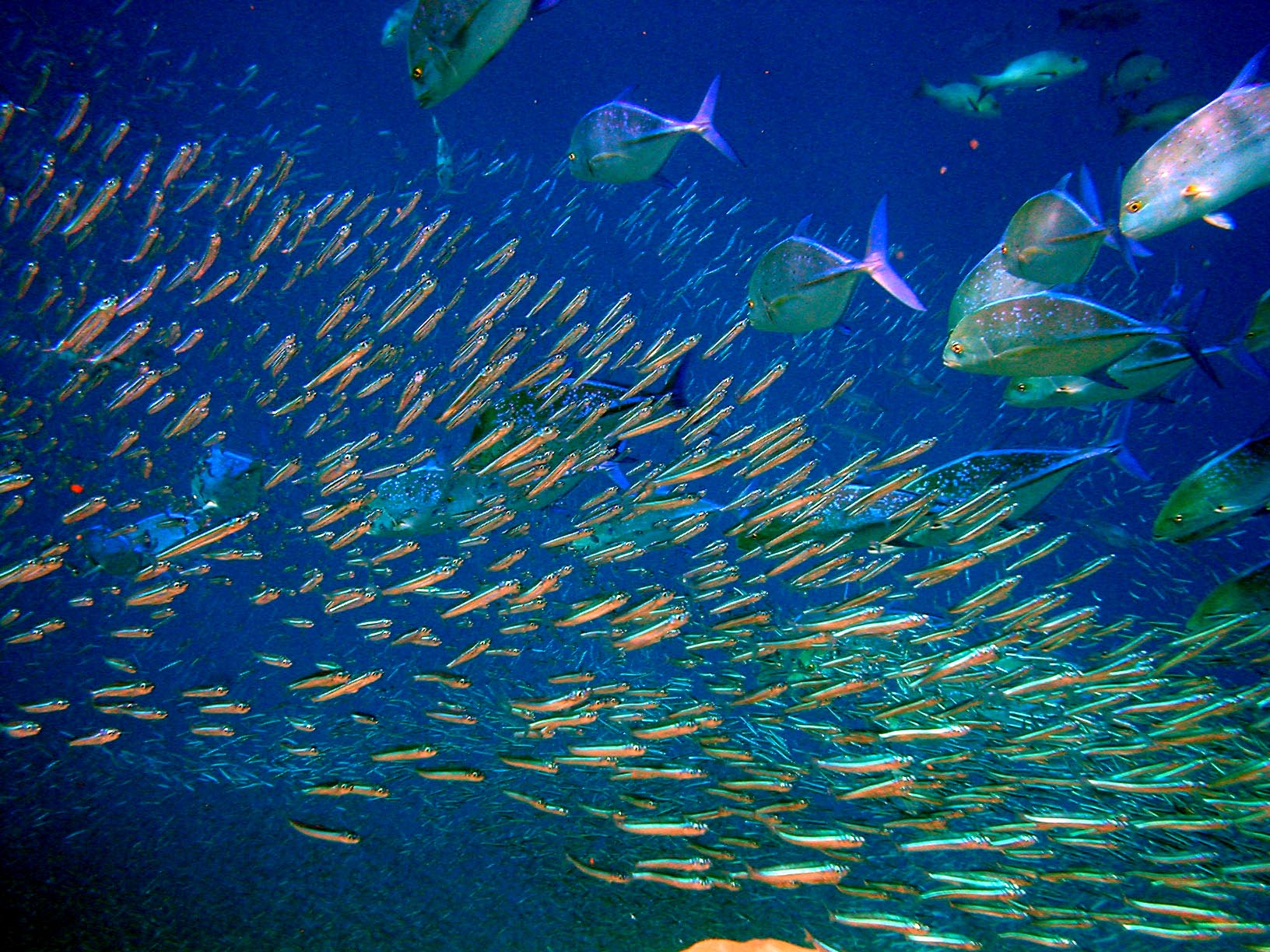
A school of pelagic fish (trevally) sizing up a school of small pelagic prey fish (anchovies)

Composed of foreign and regional graduate students, the DOP/UAç is involved in scientific and academic research in marine biology and ocean studies, within the areas of ecology, marine biology, physical and chemical oceanography and fisheries. It is a multidisciplinary institution involved in cooperative research with agreements in international (MAST III, LIFE, DG-XIV), national (PRAXIS, JNICT), and regional programs.

It is a multidisciplinary organization that supports pure and applied research, forming cooperative research programs with national and private institutions. This includes providing services for industry and public service, that includes announcements in the media, museum and educational institutions. The institution emphasizes academics, through the participation of undergraduate research students (47 by October 1997) and graduate students (13 by October 1997) in research projects, as part of its academic requirements.

This includes the studies of:

- Pelagic halieutic resources (tuna and other nektonic fish species); trophic chains; and the dynamics of large pelagic species
- Ichtyodemersal resources (fishery species with commercial value in the Azores)
- Biology and genetics of oceanic squids
- Biology and population dynamics of seamount species
- Physical oceanography
- Ecotoxicology
- General ecology and behaviour of fishes and invertebrates from littoral communities
- Ecology of hydrothermal vents
- Ecology of seabird communities
- Ecology of cetaceans (related with whalewatching activities)

== Structure ==
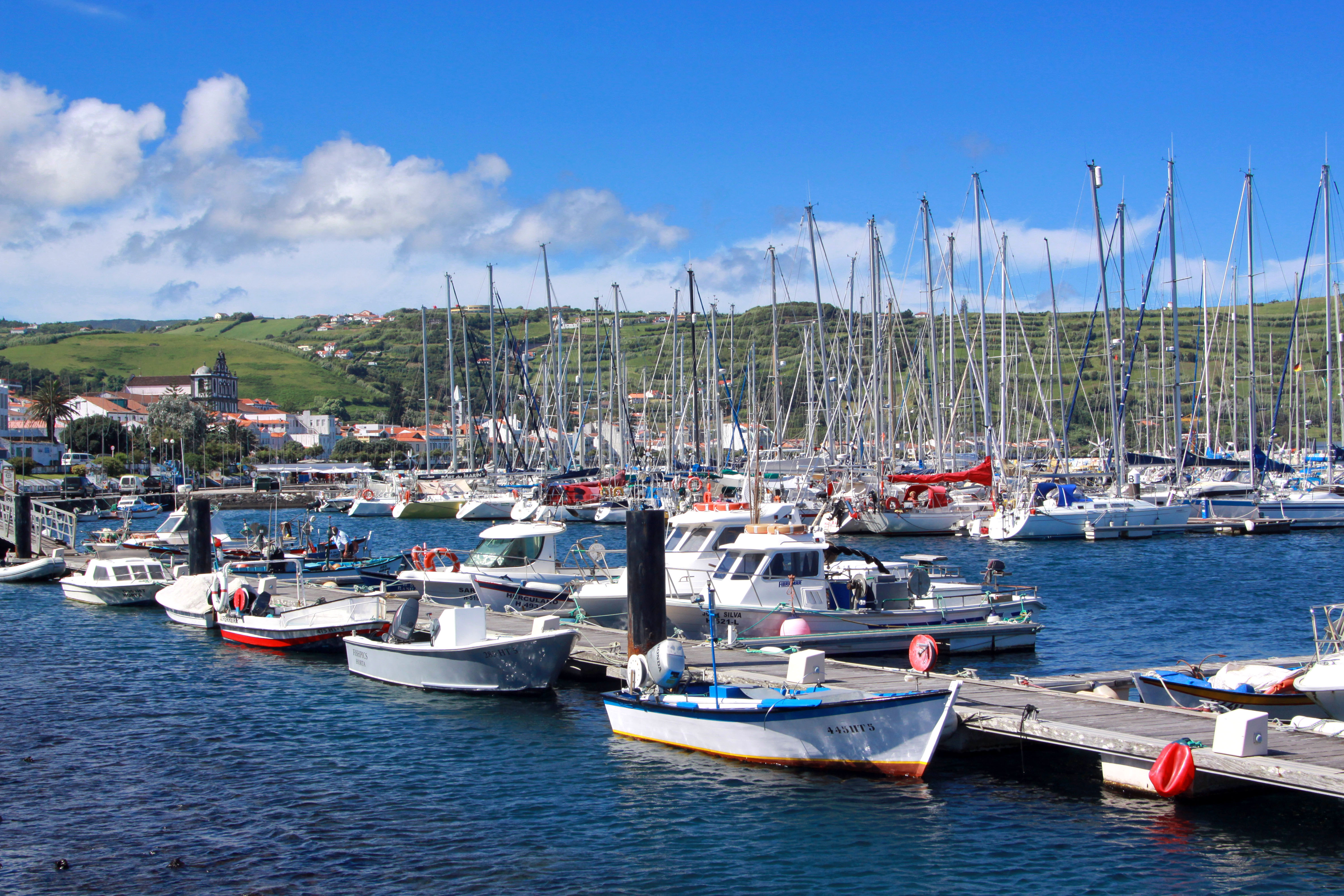
The view of the wharf of Santa Cruz in the harbour of Horta

The department is divided into four sections:

- Marine Ecology and Biodiversity (MEBS)
- Fisheries Resources
- Oceanography
- Chemistry

Supporting these investigation units are five nuclei: fisheries statistics; documentation; imagery/multimedia; computer sciences; scientific diving. This includes several laboratories which support all the scientific and scholarly projects undertaken by DOP. At least one technician/researcher is responsible for each laboratory, that includes specific areas, such as: Marine Ecology and Biodiversity; Fisheries Resources; Aquaculture and Ethology; Instrumentation and Calibration; Chemistry; Oceanographic Monitoring and Modelling; Optics and Ageing; and Histology and Genetics.

== Resources ==
The DOP/UAç has an oceanographic vessel R/V Arquipélago, in addition to three other vessels/boats, at its service. The vessel patrols annually, based on a crew schedule, from their port in the harbour of Horta, in the central group. These research vessels, equipped with modern equipment, along with terrestrial-based technology and laboratories are an important part of the research activities.
