= Wee Wee Caye Marine Lab =

Biological lab in Belize

Wee Wee Caye Marine Lab is located in the country of Belize.

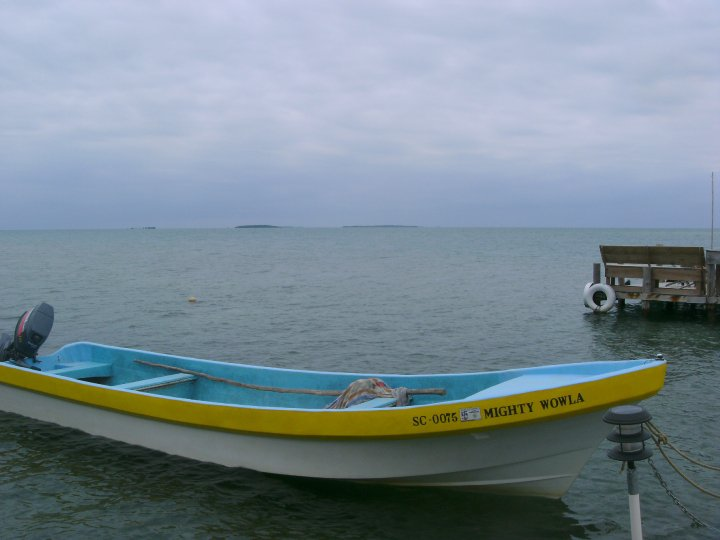
Mode of transportation and view of surrounding dock area, March 2010

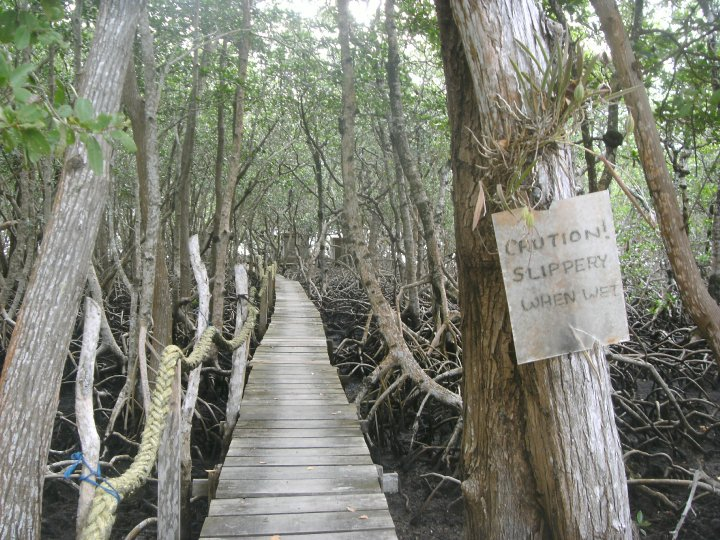
Sustainable building practice that supports ecological health and proper filtration: Boardwalks prevent compaction, erosion, and ecological damage, all the while providing significant habitat to a variety of wildlife. Contrasts significantly to local islands, whose artificial beaches negatively impact natural reef ecosystems.

This biological lab, established in 1988, is located nine miles off the coast of southern Belize in the Stann Creek District. Wee Wee Caye, the island upon which this lab is situated, is host only to this biological station, which is managed in a sustainable fashion. Mangroves surround the entirety of the island, and provides not only erosion control to the island, but additionally provides habitat that supports a wide variety of fauna.

Currently owned by two American citizens and researchers, Paul and Mary Shave, this lab employs individuals from local communities in Dangriga when visitors are present. The lab acts as a support facility to academic programs interested in marine, coastal, and tropical ecological studies. Mode of transportation to and from the island include fiberglass boats operated by licensed guides. Rustic cabins provide housing to visitors, and meals are served three times a day and are prepared by local cooks. Boardwalks connect cabins within the mangrove forest in order to prevent compaction and damage to the surrounding environment.

Many local islands within the surrounding area have altered the natural mangrove forest that typically surrounds these islands with artificial sand beaches, so as to better serve the desires of foreign tourists. However, this "beach" system not only decreases the natural habitat of a variety of species, but it also infringes on the health of the coral reef, covering many areas of the coral reef and causing death to local marine wildlife. Erosion is also significantly enhanced through this artificial "beaching" practice, and run-off is very common. Mangroves provide natural filtration, habitat, and prevent erosion into the surrounding marine environment. This biological lab seeks to encompass all of these sustainable practices in order to support wildlife in its natural system of order.

As of August 2020, partial ownership of Wee Wee Caye is for sale, and the former marine lab is being developed into a resort.
