= Institut océanographique =

Ocean education organization based in Monaco

- Founded: 1906
- Founder: Albert I, Prince of Monaco
- Location: Monaco
- Website: Oceano.org

The Institut océanographique (Institut océanographique, Fondation Albert Ier, Prince de Monaco) is an ocean education organization based in Monaco. The institute manages two ocean museums (in Monaco and Paris) and lobbies globally for the preservation of the oceans' ecology.

== History ==
The Institut océanographique was founded in 1906 by Albert I, Prince of Monaco (the International Hydrographic Organization was launched in Monaco in 1921).

In 1957, Jacques Cousteau was appointed director of the Institut océanographique. In 1961, the Institut océanographique reached an agreement with the International Atomic Energy Agency to relocate the International Laboratory of Marine Radioactivity in Monaco.

In 1998, the Institut océanographique organized the second International Aquariology Congress (the first edition was held in 1958). The European Union of Aquarium Curators was created during this event.

The institute implemented the "Monaco Blue Initiative", a global initiative focused on deep sea biodiversity and large marine species, and backed by UNESCO. In 2016, hundreds of cubic meters of archives belonging to the Institut were found in the Schœlcher campus of the University of the French West Indies (Martinique). In 2019, the Institut océanographique invested 5 million euros in the opening of a care center for marine species, especially sick or injured turtles.

== Locations ==
- Oceanographic Museum of Monaco
- Institut océanographique de Paris
