= South Stann Creek =

Watercourse in Belize

Coordinates: 16°43′N 88°18′W

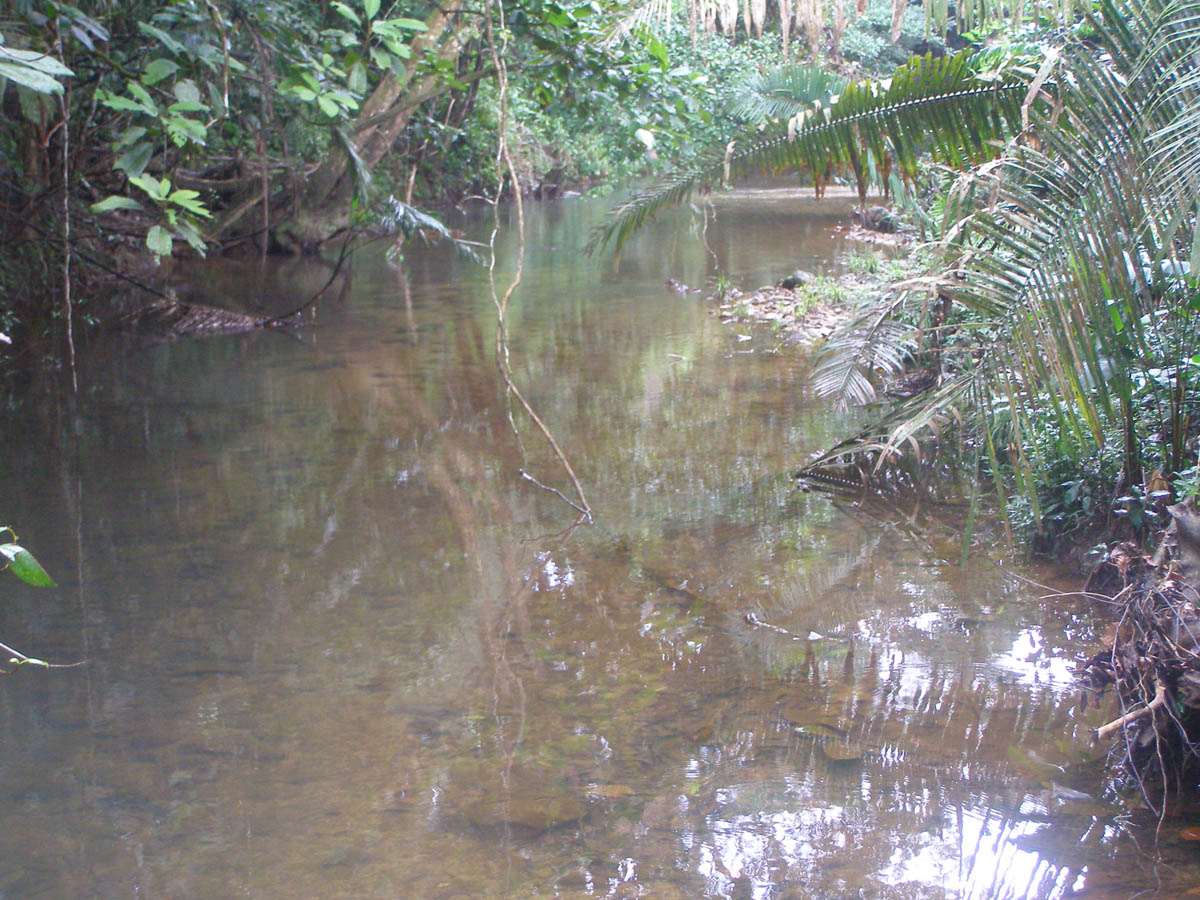
South Stann Creek on valley floor of Cockscomb West Basin

South Stann Creek is a watercourse in southeastern Belize. The administrative division, Stann Creek District, is named after the river. South Stann Creek rises in the foothills of the eastern slopes of the Maya Mountains within the Cockscomb Basin Wildlife Sanctuary. It drains the Cockscomb West Basin.

== See also ==
- Jaguar
- Logging
