= Stann Creek District =

District of Belize

Coordinates: 16°50′N 88°30′W

- District
- Location of the district in Belize
- Country: Belize
- Capital: Dangriga

Area
  - Total: 2,176 km^{2} (840 sq mi)

Population (2024 estimate)
  - Total: 50,640
  - Density: 23.27/km^{2} (60.27/sq mi)

Ethnic groups (2022 census)
  - Hispanic/ Mestizo: 32.6%
  - Mayan: 23.2% (Note: 14.7% Mopan, 8.4% Kʼicheʼ, 0.1% Yucatec)
  - Creole: 21.8%
  - Garifuna: 17.7%
  - East Indian: 1.8%
  - White: 0.9%
  - Mennonite: 0.3%
  - Chinese: 0.3%
  - Indian: 0.2%
  - Other: 0.5%

Languages spoken (2022 census)
  - Creole: 66.4%
  - English: 59.5%
  - Spanish: 33.8%
  - Mayan: 21.6% (Note: 13.9% Mopan, 7.6% Qʼeqchiʼ, 0.1% Yucatec)
  - Garifuna: 9.1%
  - Chinese: 0.3%
  - German: 0.2% (Note: Includes speakers of both Plautdietsch and Standard German)
  - Hindi: 0.1%
  - Other: 0.1%
- ISO 3166 code: BZ-SC
- Website: www.stanncreek.com

Stann Creek is a district in the south east region of Belize. According to the 2022 census, the district had a population of 48,162 people. Its capital is the town of Dangriga, formerly known as "Stann Creek Town". Stann comes from "stanns", or safe havens used by colonialists coming from the "old world" to the "new world".

== Geography ==
Located within the district are the port of Big Creek (the main port of Belize's banana industry), the peninsula and village of Placencia (a popular tourist destination), the villages of Santa Cruz, Alta Vista, Georgetown, Independence, Kendal, Maya Mopan, Middlesex, Mullins River, Pomona, Red Bank, Sarawee, Silk Grass, San Roman, Sittee River and the Garifuna village of Hopkins.

=== Political divisions ===
The district is split into two constituencies. They are Dangriga, which contains the town proper and two villages (including Hope Creek and Sarawee) and the offshore islands (cayes), and Stann Creek West, which contains most of the remaining villages including Santa Cruz, Placencia and Independence.

=== Transportation ===
The district is served by the Hummingbird Highway and the Thomas Vincent Ramos Highway, connecting to Belize City by way of the George Price Highway at Belmopan.

== Demographics ==
=== Ethnicity ===
Ethnicity
Ethnicity	2010		2022	
%	Number	%	Number	%
Mestizo	9,501	30.15%	15,733	32.67%
Creole	5,128	16.27%	10,500	21.80%
Garifuna	7,518	23.85%	8,530	17.71%
Mopan Maya	3,166	10.05%	7,097	14.73%
Qʼeqchi Maya	1,333	4.23%	4,031	8.37%
East Indian; Indian	917; 28	2.91% 0.09%	872; 73	1.81% 0.15%
European: * British (Anglo-Celtic) * German (Mennonite)	522; 476; 46	1.66% 1.51% 0.14%	617; 449; 168	1.28% 0.93% 0.35%
Chinese/Asian	265	0.84%	156	0.32%
Other	251	0.80%	277	0.57%
Not stated	–	–	276	0.57%
Mixed	2,885	9.15%	–	–
Total	31,514	100%	48,162	100%

=== Language ===
Mostly used language in Stann Creek is English, with the main town of Dangriga having a mix of English and Garifuna, since an important part of the residents are Garifuna.

== Attractions ==
The Stann Creek District is also home to the Cockscomb Basin Wildlife Sanctuary where South Stann Creek rises. Within the preserve is Victoria Peak, the second highest point in Belize, at 1,120 meters (3,670 feet) above sea level. The ethnic Garifuna village of Hopkins has recently undergone a huge transformation due to the growing tourism industry. Placencia is home to one of Belize's most popular tourist destinations due to its large selection of resorts, guest houses, hotels and white sandy beaches. The Garifuna are direct descendants of a group of African slaves who escaped two ship-wrecked Spanish slave ships near St. Vincent in 1635. They celebrate a diverse and rich culture that is a blend of African traditions of music, dance and religious ceremonies; Native American farming, hunting, and fishing techniques; and a French and Arawak influenced language.

== See also ==
- Wee Wee Caye Marine Lab
