= List of islands of Belize =

Islands in Belize

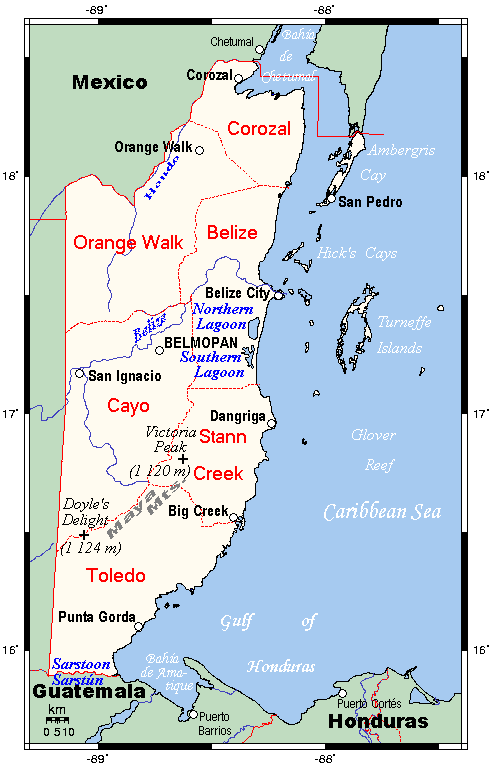
A map of Belize

The country of Belize has roughly 386 km of coastline, and has many coral reefs, cayes, and islands in the Caribbean Sea. Most of these form the Belize Barrier Reef, the longest in the western hemisphere stretching approximately 322 km (200 mi). The reef and its islands have been a UNESCO World Heritage Site since 1996.

== Caribbean cayes ==
The following is a list of oceanic islands of Belize, arranged according to region but all of which are in the Caribbean Sea. River islands have not been listed.

Nr.^{1)}	Island	Capital	Area (km^{2})	Population (Census 2012 official)	District
1000	Ambergris Group	San Pedro	76.8	13400	Inner Islands
1001	Ambergris Caye, in the far northeast, is the largest island in the country. It is also a pene-exclave because it is geographically separated from the rest of the country. The Other Cays Are:	San Pedro	64	13380	Inner Islands
1002	Blackadore Caye (Cayo Negro)	North Point village	0.43	10	Inner Islands
1003	Cayo Bracilete	Cayo Bracilete	2.2	0	Inner Islands
1004	Cayo Cangrejo	Cayo Cangrejo	1.8	0	Inner Islands
1005	Cayo Deer	North Deer cay	7.3	0	Inner Islands
1006	Cayo Espanto	APrivateIsland resort	0.02	5	Inner Islands
1007	Cayo Savannah	Savannah resort	0.11	0	Inner Islands
1008	More Islands	Cayo Mosquito, Cayo Frances, Cayo Iguana, Cayo Rosario, Cayo Romero, Cayo Tostado	0.94	0	Inner Islands
1100	Caye Caulker (also spelled Corker)	Caye Caulker	4.5	1500	Inner Islands
1200	Caye Chapel	Caye Chapel	1.2	40	Inner Islands
1300	Drowned Cayes	Isabella Caye Resort	20.2	15	Inner Islands
1301	Goff's Caye	Goff's Caye	0.13	1	Inner Islands
1302	Robinson Point Cayes	Robinson resort	1.25	0	Inner Islands
1303	Spanish Lookout Caye		0.8	10	Inner Islands
1304	Water Caye	Water Caye resort	2.6	4	Inner Islands
1305	More	Shag Caye, Turtle Caye	15.43	0	Inner Islands
1400	Hen and Chicken Cayes	Hen Caye	4.72	2	Inner Islands
1500	Hick's Cayes	Saint George's Caye	19.5	45	Inner Islands
1501	Long Caye, not to be confused with the other island further southeast	Long Cay	0.9	5	Inner Islands
1502	Saint George's Caye, the sight of an historic colonial battle	Saint George's village	0.47	25	Inner Islands
1503	More Hick's Cayes	?	18.3	15	Inner Islands
1600	Middle Long Cayes	Middle Long Caye	4.97	2	Inner Islands
1601	Middle Long Caye	Middle Long Caye	3.51	2	Inner Islands
1602	More Middle Long Cayes		1.46	0	Inner Islands
1700	Pelican Caye Range	Northeast Caye	3.48	10	Inner Islands
1701	Bugle Caye	Bugle Caye	0.07	3	Inner Islands
1702	Harvest Caye	Harvest Caye	0.55	0	Inner Islands
1703	Lagoon Caye		0.1	0	Inner Islands
1704	Lark Caye	Lark Caye	0.06	0	Inner Islands
1705	Laughing Bird Caye	Laughing Bird Caye	0.01	0	Inner Islands
1706	Long Coco Caye	Long Coco Caye	0.19	0	Inner Islands
1707	Republic of Tropicana (independent)	Blue Horizon lodge	0.13	6	Inner Islands
1708	Pelican Caye	Pelican Caye	0.04	0	Inner Islands
1709	Placencia Caye	Placencia Caye	0.28	2	Inner Islands
1710	Rendezvous Caye (southern)	Rendezvous Caye (southern)	0.1	0	Inner Islands
1711	More Islands	Little Water Caye, Peter Douglas Caye, Saddle Caye, Secret Caye, Quamina, Cat, Crawl, Bakers, Wippari, Cary, Gladden, Moho, Spit, Silk, Hatchet, Morisson, West Silk, Scipio, Colson	1.95	0	Inner Islands
1800	Punta Gorda Cayes	Moho Caye resort	5.19	0	Inner Islands
1801	Moho Cayes	Moho Caye resort	5	10	Inner Islands
1802	Snake Cayes	East Snake Caye	0.09	0	Inner Islands
1803	Wild Cane Caye	Wild Cane Caye	0.1	0	Inner Islands
1900	Sapodilla Cayes	Sapodilla Caye	0.43	7	Inner Islands
1901	Hunting Caye	Half Moon Beach	0.08	5	Inner Islands
1902	Ranguana Caye	Ranguana Caye	0.08	0	Inner Islands
1903	Sapodilla Caye	Sapodilla Caye	0.07	2	Inner Islands
1904	Frank's Caye		0.03	0	Inner Islands
1905	More	South Cay, Lime Cay, Nicholas Cay, North Spot, Red Rock, Tom Owen's Cay, Seal Cays	0.17	0	Inner Islands
2000	Tobacco Cayes	Tobacco village	7.6	56	Inner Islands
2001	Bird Island	Bird Island	0.94	0	Inner Islands
2002	Carrie Bow Caye	Carrie Bow Marine Field Station	0.01	6	Inner Islands
2003	Coco Plum Caye	Coco Plum cay resort	0.1	5	Inner Islands
2004	Cross Caye		0.5	0	Inner Islands
2005	Man-O-War Caye		0.49	0	Inner Islands
2006	Other	Colombus Caye, Sandfly Caye, Barbecue Caye, Dream Caye, Hutson Caye, Garbutt's Caye, Wee Wee Caye, Bread and Butter Cayes, Spruce Caye	1.25	0	Inner Islands
2007	Portofino Caye	Portofino Caye resort	0.04	0	Inner Islands
2008	Ragged Caye	Ragged Caye	0.62	5	Inner Islands
2009	South Water Caye	South water village	0.07	10	Inner Islands
2010	Southern Long Caye	Southern Long Caye resort	3	5	Inner Islands
2011	Stewart Caye	Stewart Caye	0.5	0	Inner Islands
2012	Thatch Caye	Thatch Caye Resort	0.05	5	Inner Islands
2013	Tobacco Caye	Tobacco village	0.03	20	Inner Islands
3000	Glover's Reef	Middle Cay village	0.4	40	Outer Islands
3001	Little Caye	Manta Resort	0.07	9	Outer Islands
3002	Long Caye	Slick Rock resort	0.06	10	Outer Islands
3003	Middle Caye	Middle Caye village	0.06	14	Outer Islands
3004	Southwest Caye	Marisol resort	0.08	4	Outer Islands
3005	Amounme Point Caye	Amounme Point Caye	0.07	0	Outer Islands
4000	Lighthouse Reef	Half Moon Caye	7.31	30	Outer Islands
4001	Half Moon Caye	Half Moon Caye	0.19	15	Outer Islands
4002	Long Caye	Calypso beach	3	5	Outer Islands
4003	Northern Caye	Northern Caye resort	4	6	Outer Islands
4004	Sandbore Caye	Sandbore Caye	0.04	4	Outer Islands
4005	More	Saddle Caye	0.08	0	Outer Islands
5000	Turneffe Atoll	Harry Jones point village	116	300	Outer Islands
5001	Baby Roach Caye	Baby Roach Caye	0.04	5	Outer Islands
5002	Blackbird Caye	Harry Jones village	20	160	Outer Islands
5003	Calabash Caye	Grand Bogue village	20	50	Outer Islands
5004	Caye Bokel	Turneffe Island lodge	0.6	25	Outer Islands
5005	Crawl Caye		0.19	0	Outer Islands
5006	Crayfish Caye	North Crayfish Caye	0.08	0	Outer Islands
5007	Cross Caye	North point	0.3	5	Outer Islands
5008	Douglas Caye	Barracuda Beach	65	35	Outer Islands
5009	Maugher Caye	lighthouse point	0.04	0	Outer Islands
5010	Pelican Caye (south)	Gales Point village	5	10	Outer Islands
5011	More	Deadman's Caye, Cockroach Cay, Dog Flea Cay, Pelican (north), Grassy, Soldier, Coco Tree, Western Four, Baloon	13.29	0	Outer Islands
5012	Shag Caye	Shag Caye	6	2	Outer Islands
5013	Three Corner Caye	Three Corner Caye	0.26	0	Outer Islands

^{1)}The Islands number relates to the 2012 island numbering program made by Belize government for real estate purposes.

=== Ambergris group ===
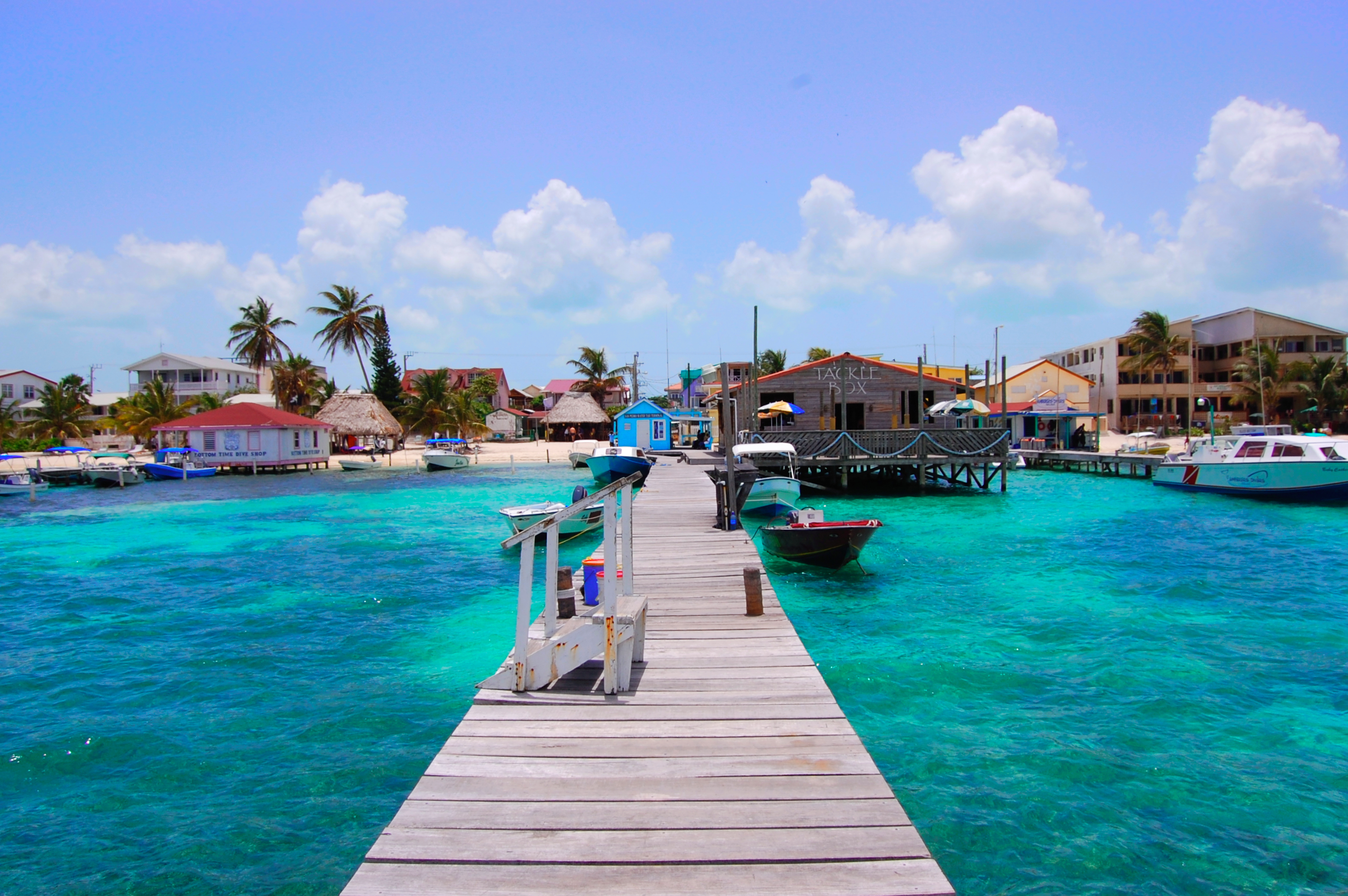
The beach at San Pedro, on Ambergris Caye.

=== Central groups ===
This group of islands form an arch around the capital city's coastline.

=== Southern groups ===
Gradually heading in a line southward, the cays decrease in size before reaching the coast of Honduras. and finally, towards the coast of Punta Gorda are some more islands.

=== Turneffe Atoll ===
The Turneffe Atoll is situated in the central Barrier Reef system, between the Inner Channel and Lighthouse Reef, and is 30 miles (48 km) long and 10 miles (16 km) wide. It is made up of a number of large cayes, such as Blackbird Caye, which surround a central lagoon. Smaller surrounding islands include:

=== Lighthouse Reef ===
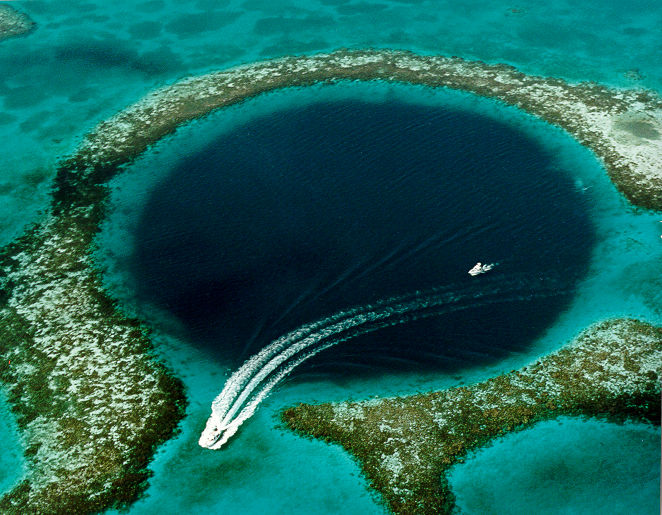
The Lighthouse Reef's most famous site is the Great Blue Hole, located at its centre.

The Lighthouse Reef system is a sunken atoll, and consists of four islands:

=== Glover's Reef ===
The Glover's Reef system is mostly submerged, with a few tiny islands. see list above.

== Islands in rivers and lakes ==
- Last Chance Caye, in Midwinter's Lagoon
- Marlowe Caye, in Midwinter's Lagoon
- Shipstern Caye, in Chetumal Bay
- Sarstoon Island, in the Sarstoon River
- Crooked Tree Wildlife Sanctuary is Crooked Tree Lagoon

== See also ==
- List of Caribbean islands
- List of islands
- List of rivers in Belize
