= Bird Island (Belize) =

Island of Belize

Coordinates: 17°21′N 88°18′W

Bird Island, also known as Man-O-War Caye, is an island of the Central American country of Belize.

== Description ==
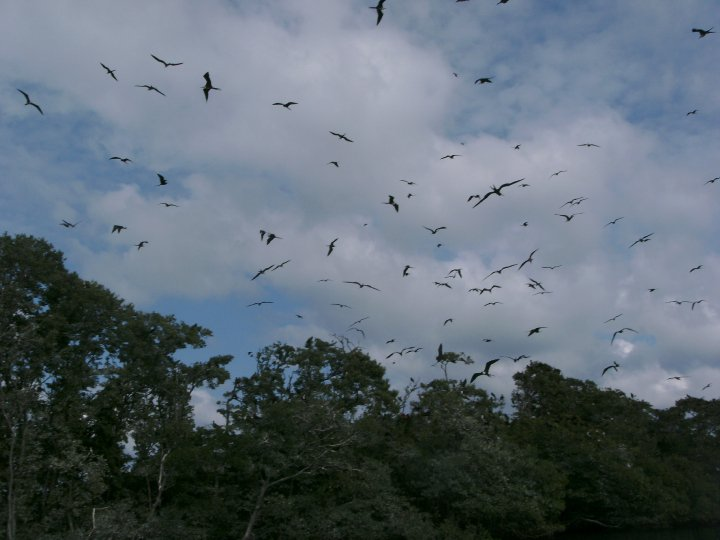
Bird Island, March 2010

Bird Island is a cay and bird sanctuary located near Tobacco Caye in the western Caribbean. The island is home to frigatebirds and red-footed boobies and tourists are not allowed to dock or set foot on it. In 2001, a hurricane destroyed the mangrove forest on the island, yet birds continued to roost. The forest has since regrown and the ecosystem restored.

== Important Bird Area ==
A 1.2m ha site off the coast of Belize, comprising the nation’s offshore and barrier islands, has been designated an Important Bird Area (IBA) by BirdLife International because it supports significant populations of several resident, passage or breeding bird species, including white-crowned pigeons, red-footed boobies, roseate terns, Yucatan vireos, black catbirds, and golden-winged and cerulean warblers. The IBA encompasses the South Water Caye, Gladden Spit and Silk Cayes, Sapodilla Cayes and Glover's Reef marine reserves, Half Moon Caye, Laughing Bird Caye and Man-O-War Caye islands, as well as several spawning aggregations.
