= Half Moon Caye =

Island of Belize

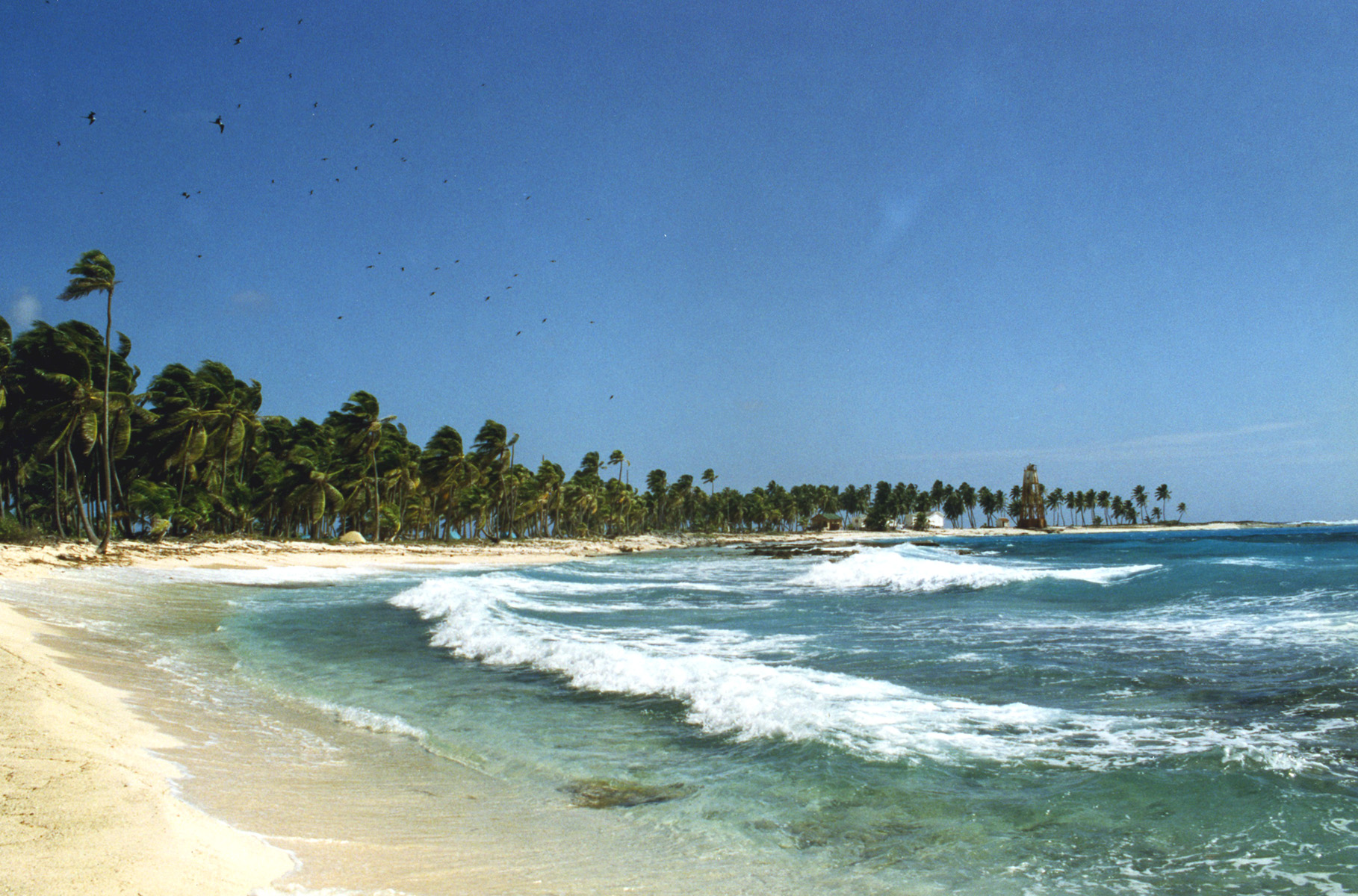
- The windward shore of Half Moon Caye

- Location within Belize

Geography
- Location: Lighthouse Reef
- Coordinates: 17.2047°N 87.5364°W
- Adjacent to: Caribbean Sea
- Area: 0.168 km^{2} (0.065 sq mi)
- Length: 0.8 km (0.5 mi)
- Width: 0.2 km (0.12 mi)

Administration
- Belize
- District: Belize District

Half Moon Caye is an island and natural monument of Belize located at the southeast corner of Lighthouse Reef Atoll. This natural monument was the first nature reserve to have been established in Belize under the National Park Systems Act in 1981 and first marine protected area in Central America. This is also Belize's oldest site of wildlife protection since it was first designated as a bird sanctuary in 1924 to protect the habitat of the red-footed booby birds.

== World Heritage Site ==
Half Moon Caye Natural Monument is part of the Belize Barrier Reef Reserve System World Heritage Site which was established on December 4, 1996, by the United Nations World Heritage Committee after they formally adopted seven marine protected areas along the Belize Barrier Reef and its adjacent atolls under UNESCO at their meeting in Mérida, Mexico.

== Significant features ==
- The littoral forest, composed primarily of the orange-flowered siricote tree, provides an endangered and fragile habitat that supports one of the only viable breeding grounds for the red-footed booby colony in the western Caribbean. The booby colony supports the forest’s stability by providing guano as fertilizer. It is also a habitat tor the endemic Belize leaf-toed gecko (also known as the Belize atoll gecko) and Allison's anole lizard.
- The south eastern part of the island serves annually as a sea turtle nesting ground from May to November for the loggerhead, hawksbill, and green turtles, all endangered species.

== Important Bird Area ==
A 1.2m ha site off the coast of Belize, comprising the nation’s offshore and barrier islands, has been designated an Important Bird Area (IBA) by BirdLife International because it supports significant populations of several resident, passage or breeding bird species, including white-crowned pigeons, red-footed boobies, roseate terns, Yucatan vireos, black catbirds, and golden-winged and cerulean warblers. The IBA encompasses the South Water Caye, Gladden Spit and Silk Cayes, Sapodilla Cayes and Glover's Reef marine reserves, Half Moon Caye, Laughing Bird Caye and Man-O-War Caye islands, as well as several spawning aggregations.
