= Gladden Spit and Silk Cayes Marine Reserve =

Marine reserve of Belize

Coordinates: 16°34′N 88°02′W

- IUCN category IV (habitat/species management area)
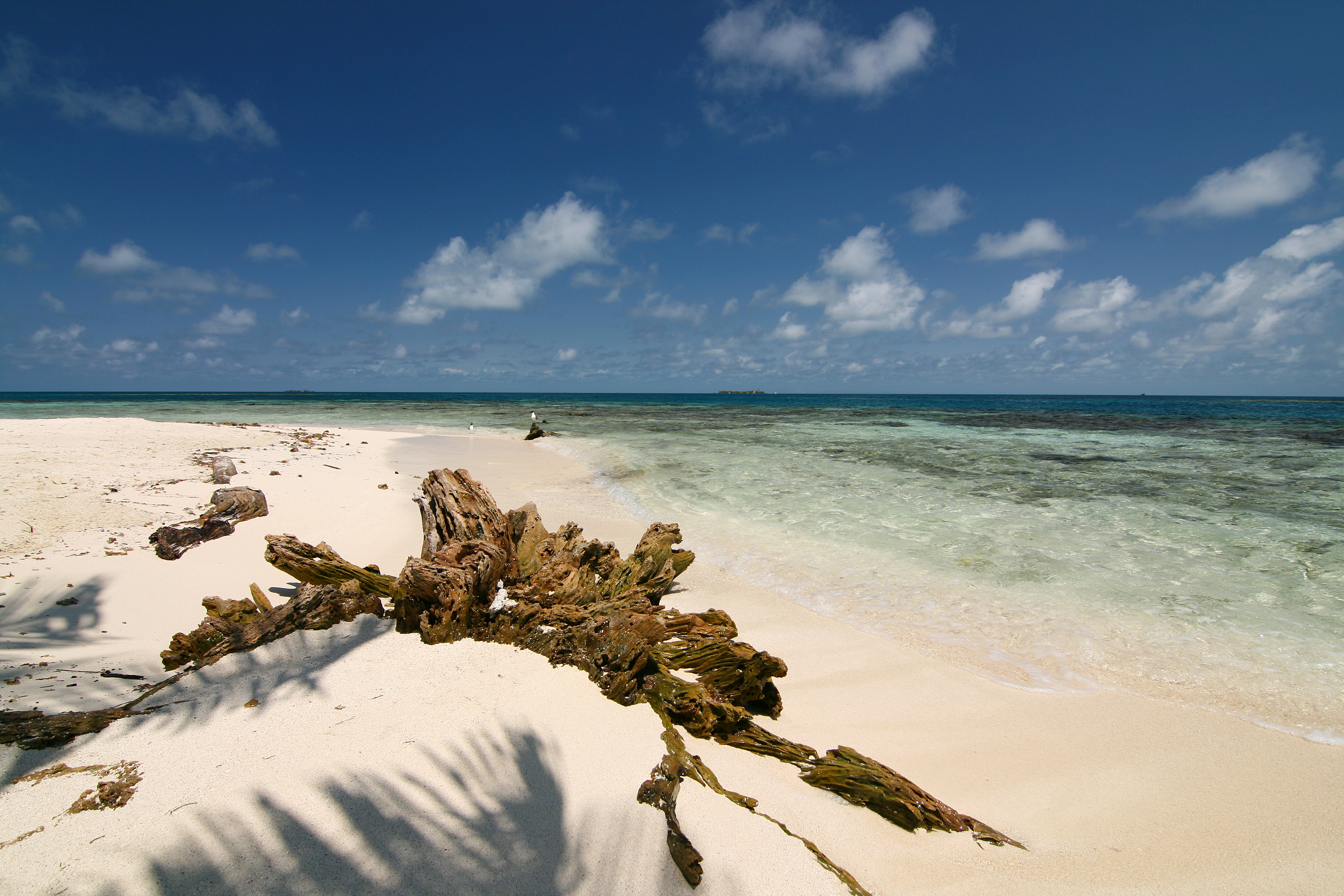
- Beach on one of the Silk Cayes
- Interactive map of Gladden Spit and Silk Cayes Marine Reserve
- Location: Gulf of Honduras
- Nearest city: Placencia, Stann Creek
- Area: 10,510 hectares (26,000 acres)
- Established: 18 May 2000
- Governing body: Ministry of Forestry, Fisheries & Sustainable Development; Southern Environmental Association

Gladden Spit and Silk Cayes Marine Reserve (GSSCMR) is a protected marine reserve in the central part of Belize's Barrier Reef. It covers approximately 25,980 acres (10,510 ha) lying 36 kilometres (22 mi) off the coast of Placencia. Established in 2003, The reserve comes under the authority of the government's Fisheries Department, but is managed by the Southern Environmental Association, a community-based organisation.

== History ==
The reserve was declared on 18 May 2000 (Gazette No. 68/2000). In 2001, the feeding site of the whale sharks was declared a special protected zone. Tourism regulations were drafted to regulate the increasing number of whale shark tours. Since 2003, the reserve has been divided into a general use zone, a no-take zone around the Silk Cayes, a conch restoration zone and a whale shark and reef-fish spawning aggregation conservation zone.

== Geography ==
Gladden Spit is a promontory forming the southernmost tip of the sunken atoll. The spit has a short sloping shelf that drops off steeply at about 40–2000 metres in depth within 10 kilometres (6.2 mi) of the reef.

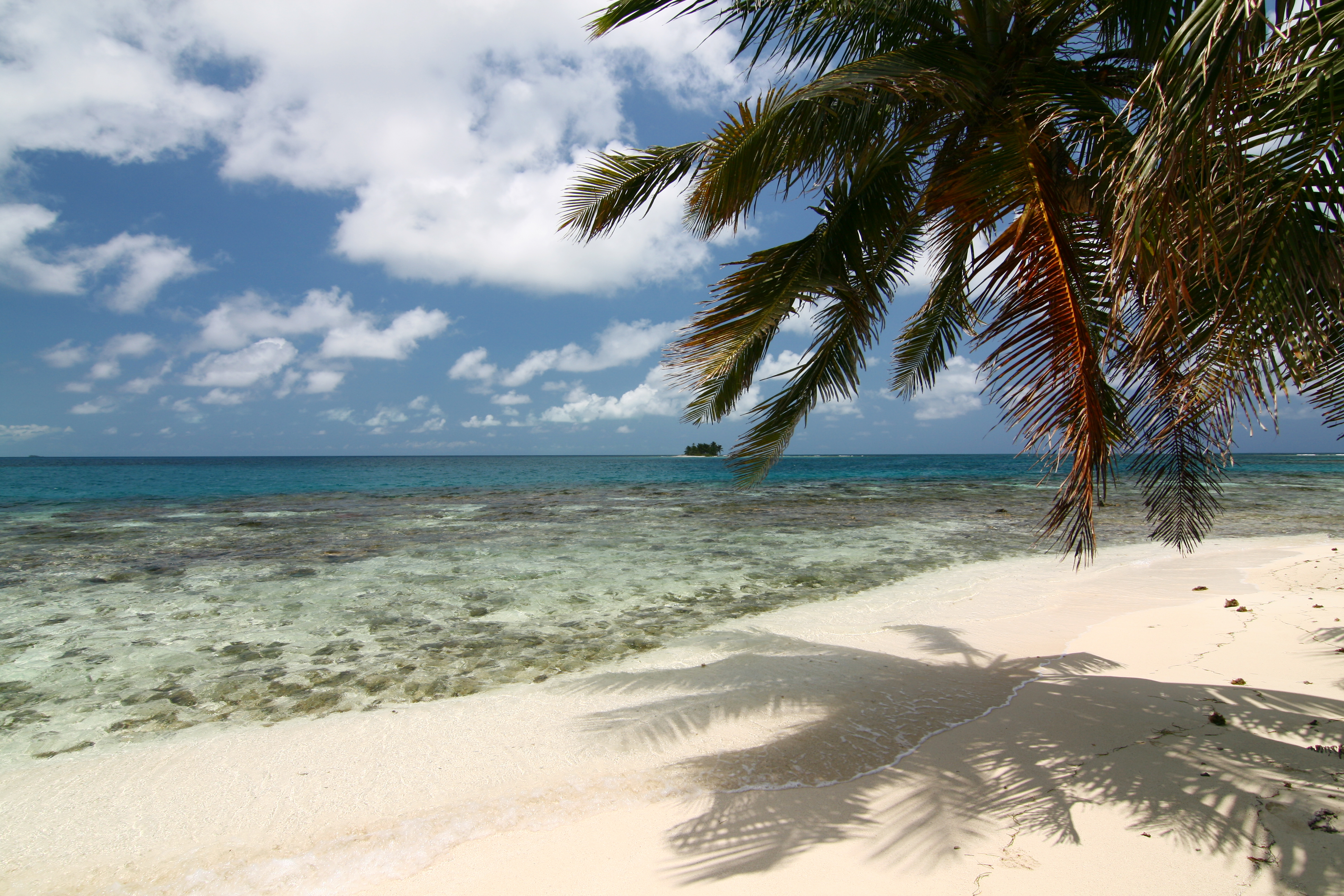
Silk Caye scene

Three small cayes: North Silk, Middle Silk and South Silk, lie south of Gladden entrance just inside Queen Caye. A nesting colony of terns has been recorded on North Silk Caye.

The reserve contains some of the healthiest parts of the reef system due to its elevation and good water quality. Gladden Spit itself hosts over 25 species of reef fish. Since the 1920s, fishermen have congregated here to harvest mutton snapper and grouper during their ten-day spawning aggregation period that occurs between March and June. Historically, fishermen recorded substantial catches, and whale sharks—who come to feed on the eggs—were sighted in large numbers. It is the only place worldwide where this activity is known to occur.

== Important Bird Area ==
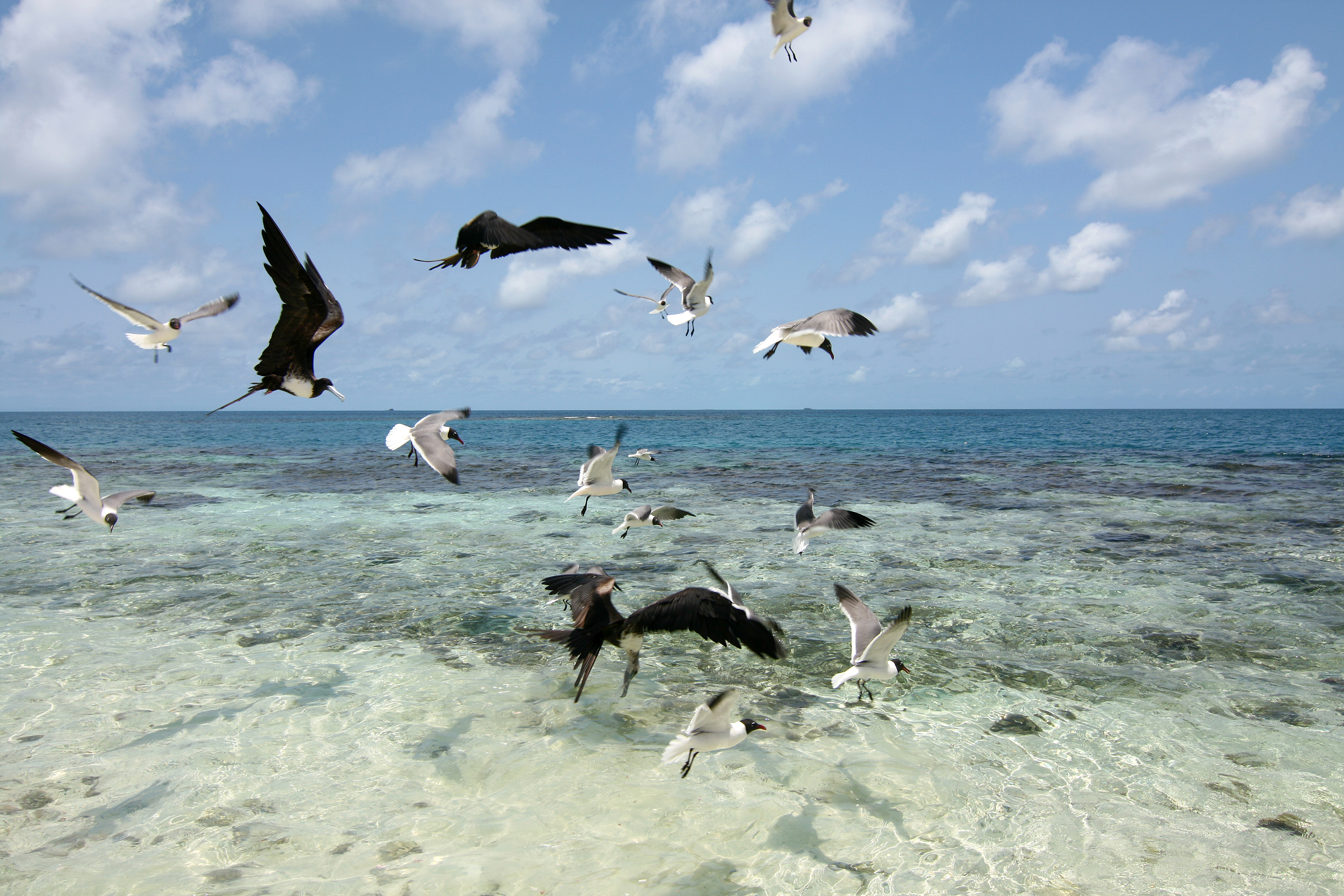
Frigatebirds and laughing gulls at Silk Caye

A 1.2m ha site off the coast of Belize, comprising the nation’s offshore and barrier islands, has been designated an Important Bird Area (IBA) by BirdLife International because it supports significant populations of several resident, passage or breeding bird species, including white-crowned pigeons, red-footed boobies, roseate terns, Yucatan vireos, black catbirds, and golden-winged and cerulean warblers. The IBA encompasses the South Water Caye, Gladden Spit and Silk Cayes, Sapodilla Cayes and Glover's Reef marine reserves, Half Moon Caye, Laughing Bird Caye and Man-O-War Caye islands, as well as several spawning aggregations.
