= Sandbore Caye Lighthouse =

Lighthouse in Belize City, Belize

Sandbore Caye Light
- Location: Sandbore Caye; Belize
- Coordinates: 17.464382°N 87.488240°W

Tower
- Constructed: 1886 (first), 1931 (second)
- Construction: metal skeletal tower
- Height: 25 metres (82 ft) (current); 20 metres (66 ft) (first); 21 metres (69 ft) (second)
- Shape: square pyramidal tower with balcony
- Markings: red tower and a white upper band, white balcony
- Power source: solar power

Light
- First lit: 1931
- Focal height: 25 metres (82 ft) (current)
- Range: 17 nmi (31 km; 20 mi)
- Characteristic: Fl W 10s.

Sandbore Caye lighthouse is a lighthouse located at the north end of the Lighthouse Reef at 74 kilometres (46 mi) from Belize City, Belize.

== History ==
The station on Sandbore Caye was established in 1886 building the first lighthouse formed by a skeletal tower 20 metres (66 ft) high replaced in 1931 with a similar one higher. The current light has a skeletal square truncated tower with balcony and a focal height of 25 metres (82 ft); it emits a white flash every 10 seconds.

== See also ==
- List of lighthouses in Belize
