= Laughing bird =

Laughing bird may refer to:

- Laughing Bird Caye, an island off the coast of Placencia, Belize

== Birds ==
- Laughing falcon
- Laughing kookaburra
- Laughing owl
- Laughing gull
- Laughing dove
