= Laughing Bird Caye =

Island in Stann Creek District, Belize

Laughing Bird Caye National Park
- IUCN category II (national park)
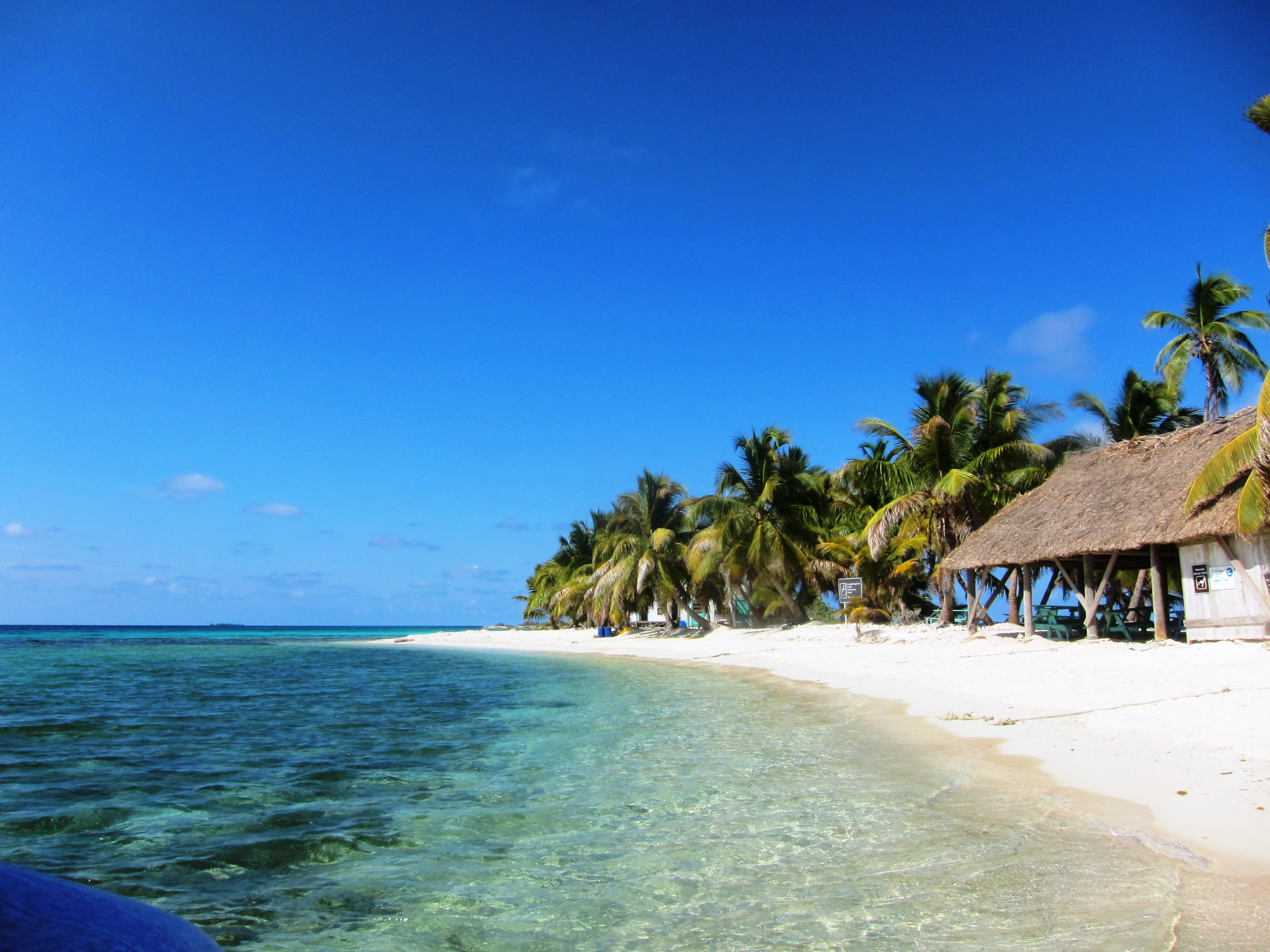

- Location within Belize
- Location: Stann Creek District, Belize
- Nearest city: Placencia
- Coordinates: 16°26′36″N 88°11′50″W
- Area: 1.8 acres (0.73 ha)
- Established: 1991

Laughing Bird Caye is an island off the coast of Placencia, Belize. On 21 December 1991, Laughing Bird Caye National Park was declared. It is spread over an area of 1.8 acres (0.73 ha). The island is named after a population of laughing gulls which previously bred there.

== History ==
This island is referred to as Laughing Bird Caye from the laughing gull or Larus artricilla. It was named after this bird because they used to breed on the island. However, due to an increase in human activity on the island the Laughing Gulls have moved to other islands that are more deserted and less affected by human presence. The uniqueness of the island, the faro, and the abundant diversity of coral and marine habitats led to the Caye being declared as a protected area in 1981 under the National Park Systems Act. Subsequently, Laughing Bird Caye was declared a national park in 1991. The Belize Barrier Reef Reserve System was then registered on the World Heritage List in 1996 with The Laughing Bird National Park designated as one of the premiere protected areas within the World Heritage Site.

== Geography ==
Laughing Bird Caye is an island located 12 miles (19 km) off the coast of Placencia village in the Stann Creek District of Belize on the western side of Victoria Channel. It is 3.5 miles south southwest of Moho Caye and 7 miles north northwest of Ranguana Caye. The precise GPS coordinates of the island are 16°26'36" North latitude and 88°11'50" West longitude. Laughing Bird Caye is also the southernmost island in the central lagoon of the Belize Barrier Reef.

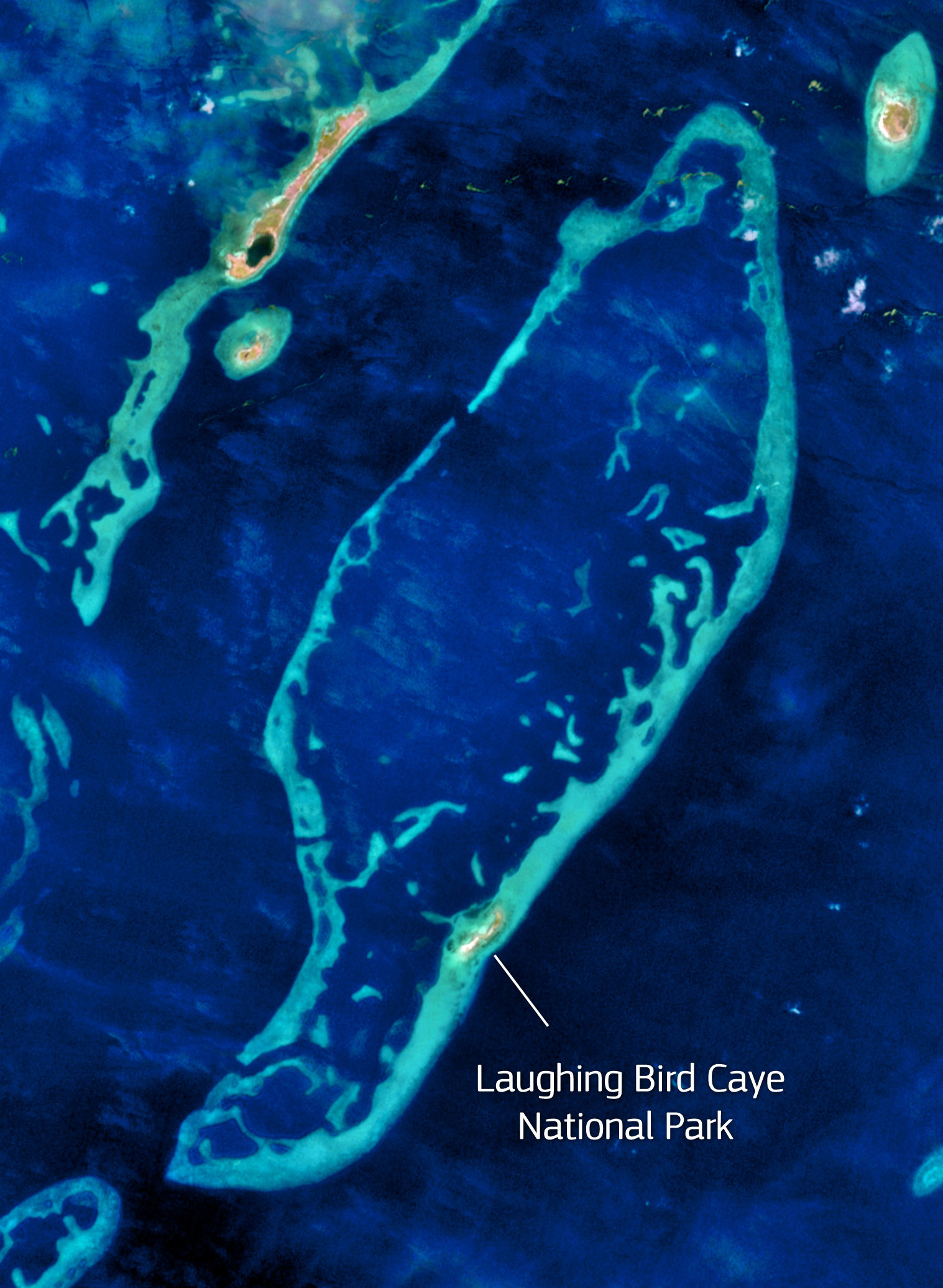
The Caye as seen by Sentinel-2

Laughing Bird Caye is a long island that sits on an unusually long narrow ridge of reef called a faro. A faro is an angular atoll on a continental shelf, which is also called a shelf atoll. Similar to other atolls, a faro has a steep drop off and has a central lagoon enclosed in the reef. This Laughing Bird Faro is separated from the mainland and the barrier reef by deep channels all around. The faro extends for 0.25 miles (0.40 km) south of the Caye.

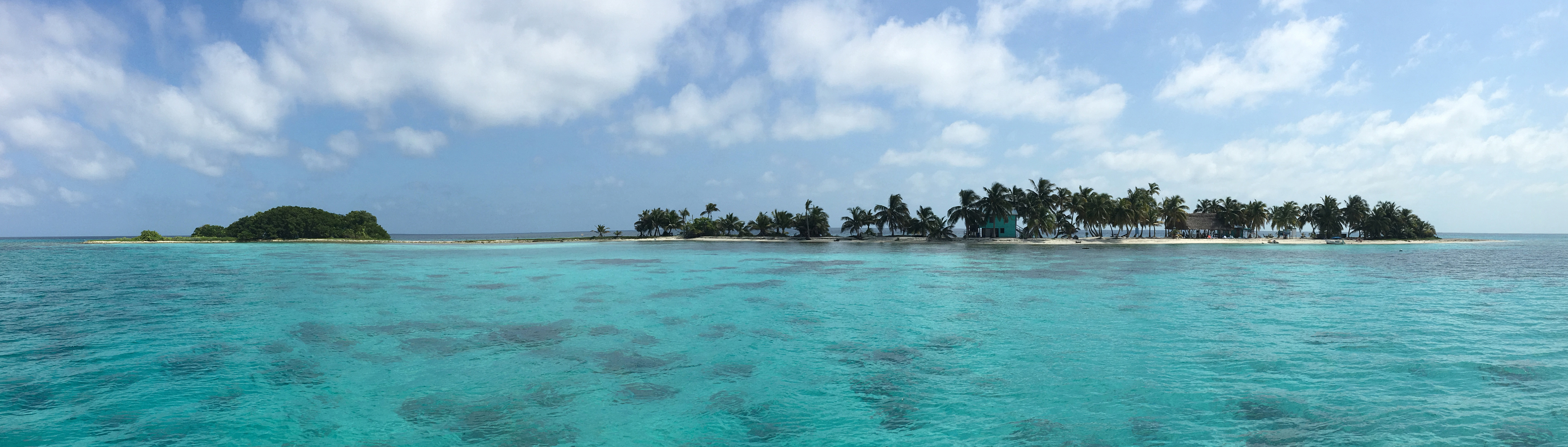
Laughing Bird Caye from the west

== Important Bird Area ==
A 1.2m ha site off the coast of Belize, comprising the nation’s offshore and barrier islands, has been designated an Important Bird Area (IBA) by BirdLife International because it supports significant populations of several resident, passage or breeding bird species, including white-crowned pigeons, red-footed boobies, roseate terns, Yucatan vireos, black catbirds, and golden-winged and cerulean warblers. The IBA encompasses the South Water Caye, Gladden Spit and Silk Cayes, Sapodilla Cayes and Glover's Reef marine reserves, Half Moon Caye, Laughing Bird Caye and Man-O-War Caye islands, as well as several spawning aggregations.
