= Sapodilla Cayes =

Uninhabited atoll in the Gulf of Honduras, Belize

Sapodilla Cayes Marine Reserve
- IUCN category IV (habitat/species management area)
- Interactive map of Sapodilla Cayes Marine Reserve
- Location: Gulf of Honduras
- Nearest city: Punta Gorda
- Coordinates: 16°08′46″N 88°16′52″W
- Area: 15,618 hectares (38,590 acres)
- Established: 1996
- Governing body: Ministry of Natural Resources and the Environment; Southern Environmental Association

Sapodilla Cayes
Disputed island

Administration
- Belize

Claimed by
- Guatemala
- Honduras

The Sapodilla Cayes (Spanish: Cayos Zapotillos) is an uninhabited atoll in the Gulf of Honduras, in the Toledo District of Belize. They are administered by Belize, but Guatemala claims that the Belize–Guatemala maritime boundary is northwest of the cayes. Honduras also lays a claim to the Sapodilla Cayes in its 1982 constitution.

== Geography ==
The Sapodilla Cayes are a system of cayes, or low sandy islands, that are part of the Mesoamerican Barrier Reef System.

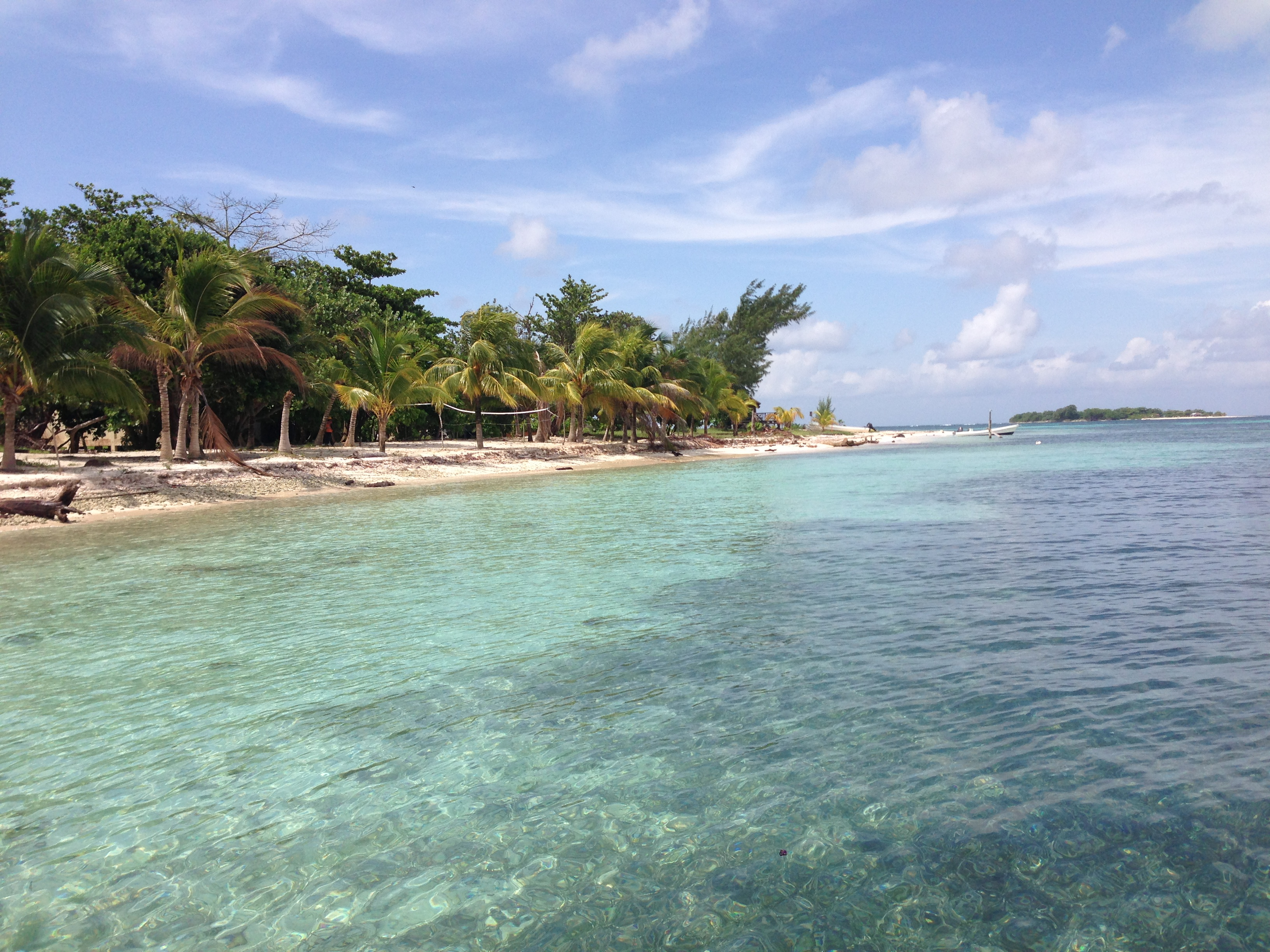
Facing south on Hunting Caye, with Lime Caye in the background

== Marine reserve ==
Sapodilla Cayes Marine Reserve is a national protected marine reserve declared over the Sapodilla Cayes. It was established in 1996 and is administered by the Fisheries Department of Belize.

== Important Bird Area ==
A 1.2m ha site off the coast of Belize, comprising the nation’s offshore and barrier islands, has been designated an Important Bird Area (IBA) by BirdLife International because it supports significant populations of several resident, passage or breeding bird species, including white-crowned pigeons, red-footed boobies, roseate terns, Yucatan vireos, black catbirds, and golden-winged and cerulean warblers. The IBA encompasses the South Water Caye, Gladden Spit and Silk Cayes, Sapodilla Cayes and Glover's Reef marine reserves, Half Moon Caye, Laughing Bird Caye and Man-O-War Caye islands, as well as several spawning aggregations.

== See also ==
- Belizean–Guatemalan territorial dispute
