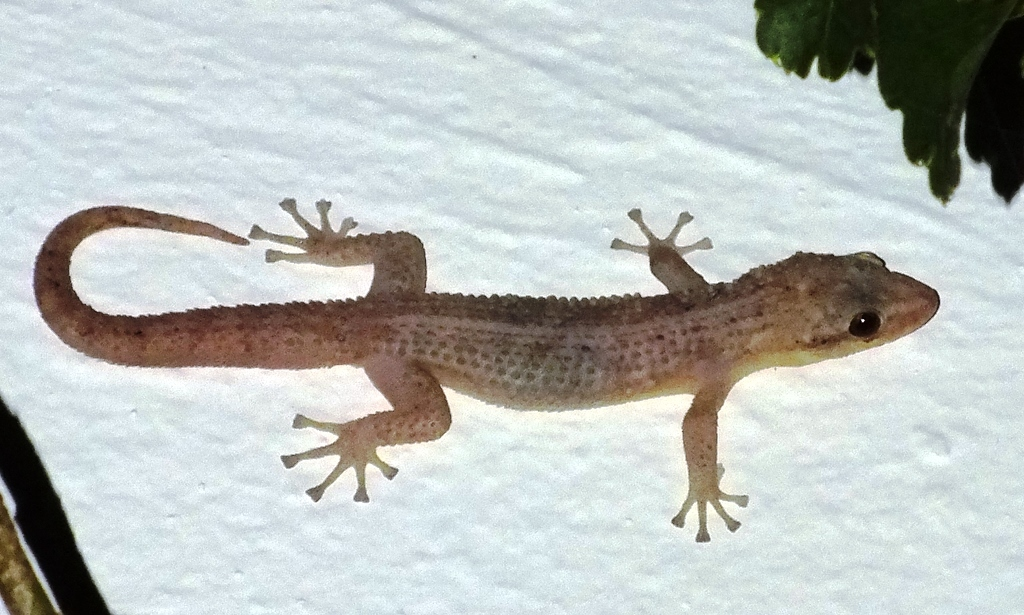
- Phyllodactylus insularis in Turneffe Flats, Belize

Conservation status
- Vulnerable (IUCN 3.1)

Scientific classification
- Kingdom: Animalia
- Phylum: Chordata
- Class: Reptilia
- Order: Squamata
- Suborder: Gekkota
- Family: Phyllodactylidae
- Genus: Phyllodactylus
- Species: P. insularis

Binomial name
- Phyllodactylus insularis Dixon, 1960

= Belize leaf-toed gecko =

Species of lizard

The Belize leaf-toed gecko (Phyllodactylus insularis) is a species of gecko native to Belize. It is a small, pale, large headed gecko only found on small islands off Belize's coast and was first described by James R. Dixon in 1960. This species is currently classified as "vulnerable" by the IUCN Red List.

== Description ==
The Belize leaf-toed gecko is a small, pale, large-headed gecko. It is nocturnal and emerges from under barks and limbs to feed on insects and other arthropods. Like other geckos it has adhesive friction pads on the toes of each foot. The gecko emits a sounds similar to a high pitched squeak or click.

== Habitat ==
The gecko lives in trees and can be found in littoral forests on small islands. It is endemic to lowland Maya forests. Sub-adults are exclusively found under surface objects while adults are found solely on palm trunks.

== Distribution ==
The Belize leaf-toed gecko has been recorded on Half Moon Caye, Long Caye, Twin Cayes, Glover's Reef, Crawl Caye, False Caye, Lagoon Caye, Peter Douglas Caye, Ambergris Caye and West Snake Caye off the coast of Belize.

=== Elevation ===
Elevation ranges from sea level to 50 meters.

== Reproduction ==
They are oviparous and typically lay 1 or 2 eggs in a clutch

== Predation ==
Phyllodactus insularis is known to be preyed upon by rats.

== Threats ==
The IUCN Red List reports that habitat destruction caused by tourism development is a threat to this species. It is also threatened by sea level rise and storm surge.

== See also ==
- Fauna of Belize
