= Yarborough Cemetery =

Historical cemetery in Belize City, Belize

Coordinates: 17.488032°N 88.189813°W

Yarborough Cemetery is an historic cemetery located in Belize City, Belize. It was the first cemetery in British Honduras, used from 1787 until 1896, and was established for the burial of members of the colonial Anglican Church. It was named after the magistrate who owned the land. The cemetery was renovated in 1999 with the addition of perimeter fencing, landscaping and a marble memorial wall highlighting the names and contributions of those buried there. In 2009, the government designated it an archaeological reserve.

The cemetery is located near St. John's Cathedral, near Government House.
