= Tapir Mountain Nature Reserve =

Protected area in Belize

Tapir Mountain Nature Reserve is a protected area in Belize, Central America. It falls under category (Ia) of the International Union for Conservation of Nature protected areas categories. It is managed by the Belize Forest Department and co-managed by the Belize Karst Habitat Conservation.

== About Tapir Mountain Nature Reserve ==
Tapir Mountain Nature Reserve (TMNR), Belize's very first nature reserve, comprises 6,286 acres of pristine lowland tropical evergreen forest on limestone (karstic) soils. Nestled in the lowland foothills below the north-facing escarpment of the Maya Mountains Massif, it is located a mere eight miles southwest of Belmopan, Belize's capital, and five miles south of the Western Highway corridor that connects Belize City with the Guatemalan border. TMNR lies entirely within the Belize River watershed and provides significant protection of the Barton Creek and Roaring Creek sub-watersheds. Barton Creek partially defines TMNR's western boundary and Roaring Creek its eastern boundary. The undisturbed forested landscapes of TMNR drain into these two creeks, providing a significant watershed buffer for the downstream communities of Teakettle, Ontario, and Blackman Eddy. Characteristic landscape features of the reserve's rugged limestone topography include sinkholes and underground streams and caves formed from erosion of the porous karstic layer. Water can be scarce in this karst landscape, especially during the dry months, during which smaller streams that emerge as springs within the hill slopes, retreat underground. Due to reduced rainfall and seasonally dry conditions, forests on limestone tend to have species adapted to drought conditions.

== Communities Adjacent to Tapir Mountain Nature Reserve ==
The primary stakeholder communities of TMNR are located on the Western Highway. These include Teakettle (population: 1,747), Ontario (population: 775) and Blackman Eddy (population: 534). Their primary focus is agricultural activities and employment in the tourism sector. Other communities also considered in the area include Upper and Lower Barton Creek (populations: 380 and 193 respectively) and El Progresso-7 Miles (population: 483). All three are farming communities.

== Biodiversity ==
The forest ecosystems of TMNR support a rich diversity of flora and fauna with perhaps as many as a thousand species of plants (of which only a fraction have been documented to date), at least 55 mammal species, and more than 340 species of birds (and counting). The reserve protects two of Belize's high-risk species – Geoffroy's spider monkey and white-lipped peccary. Three species – Baird's tapir, Geoffroy's spider monkey, and Yucatán black howler Monkey are globally ‘Endangered’ under IUCN classification, and one (White-lipped Peccary) is classified as ‘Vulnerable’. TMNR has also been identified as an important wintering habitat for migratory bird species and as an important forest foraging site for the critically endangered orange-breasted falcon, which nests in the Mountain Pine Ridge three miles to the south.
