= Lighthouse Reef =

Atoll off the coast of Belize

Coordinates: 17°18′N 87°33′W

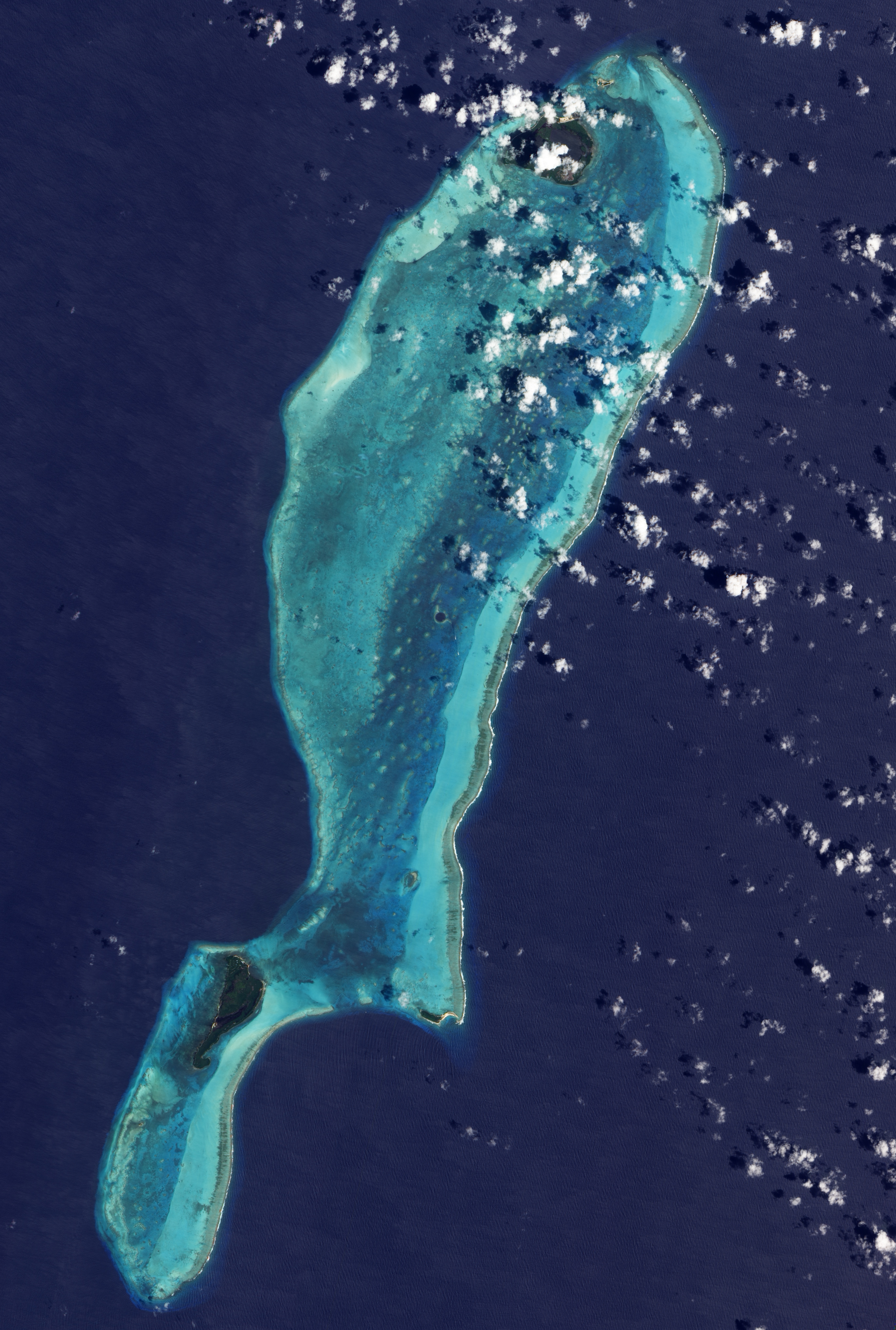
Satellite view of Lighthouse Reef

Lighthouse Reef is an atoll in the Caribbean Sea, the easternmost part of the Belize Barrier Reef and one of its three atolls, the other two being Turneffe Atoll and Glover's Reef. Lighthouse Reef is located about 80 kilometres (50 mi) southeast of Belize City. The atoll is of oblong shape, approximately 35 kilometres (22 mi) long from north to south, and about 8 kilometres (5.0 mi) wide. It forms a shallow sandy lagoon with an area of 120 square kilometres (46 sq mi) and a depth between 2 and 6 metres (6 ft 7 in and 19 ft 8 in) deep.

The reef is one of the best developed and healthiest reefs in the Caribbean, "with an emergent fringing reef, a sloping fore reef with a coral rimmed shelf edge, vertical coral walls, and numerous patch reefs in the shallow central lagoon."

There are several islands, listed here from north to south:

- Sandbore Caye
- Northern Caye
- Half Moon Caye
- Saddle Caye
- Long Caye
- Hat Caye

Lighthouse Reef is known as a snorkelling and diving destination, considered one of the best dive sites in Belize and the whole Caribbean. Notable diving locations are Half Moon Caye Wall, Long Caye Aquarium ("The Aquarium"), Silver Caves, Tres Cocos, and West Point. In addition to these coral reefs, it is also home to the Great Blue Hole.

== Flora and fauna ==
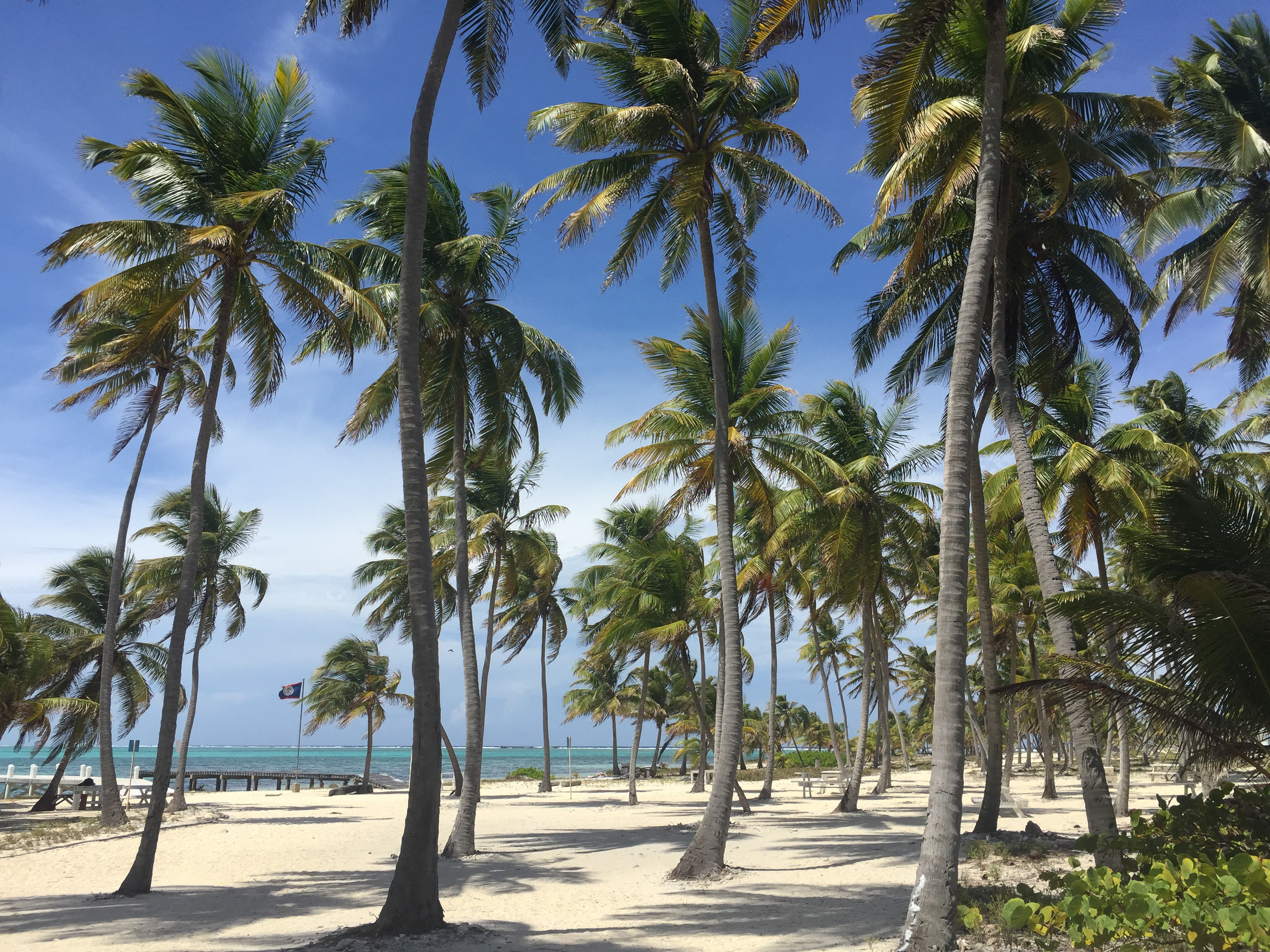
Half Moon Caye

The flora on the reef islands is mostly coconut trees. On the western half of Half Moon Caye there is a rare surviving example of an atoll siricote (Cordia sebestena) forest, while there is natural vegetation on Sandbore Cay. Half Moon Caye is home to a rookery of magnificent frigatebird (Fregata magnificens), as well as a nesting colony of some 4000 red-footed booby (Sula sula). A colony of white-crowned pigeons (Columba leucocephala) formerly nested on Long Cay but has been wiped out by overhunting.

The most dominant fish species at the reef are creole wrasse (Clepticus parrae) and blue chromis (Chromis cyanea). Other prevalent species are (in descending order of prevalence) blackcap basslet (Gramma melacara), bicolor damselfish (Pomacentrus partitus), brown chromis (Chromis multilineata), yellowtail snapper (Ocyurus chrysurus), bluehead wrasse (Thalassoma bifasciatum), royal gramma (Gramma loreto), masked goby (Coryphopterus personatus), and sunshine chromis (Chromis insolata).

Endangered and threatened animal species include the American crocodile (Crocodylus acutus), three species of sea turtles (hawksbill (Eretmochelys imbricata), loggerhead (Caretta caretta), and green sea turtle (Chelonia mydas)), the endemic Belize leaf-toed gecko (Phyllodactylus insularis), and the Allison's anole (Anolis allisoni).

== Environmental protection ==
The reef has only partial environmental protection. The Great Blue Hole and Half Moon Caye have been designated as Natural Monuments and are UNESCO World Heritage Sites (as part of the Belize Barrier Reef Reserve System) since 1996. The protected areas are 4.14 square kilometres (1.60 sq mi) and 39.25 square kilometres (15.15 sq mi) in size respectively. Additionally, 3 more areas are National Protected Areas: Northern Two Cayes (a 3.75 square kilometres (1.45 sq mi) Nassau Grouper & Species Protection site), Sandbore (a 5.18 square kilometres (2.00 sq mi) Spawning Aggregation Site Reserve), and South Point (another 5.44 square kilometres (2.10 sq mi) Spawning Aggregation Site Reserve). Despite the protection, the atoll suffers from human impact in the form of uncontrolled fishing and tourism.
