= Glover's Reef =

Marine reserve of Belize

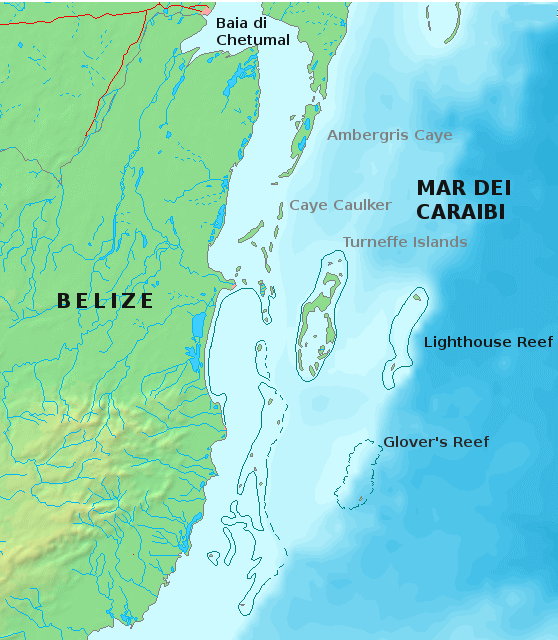
Map of Belize's southern islands, with Glover's in the bottom right corner

Glover's Reef is a partially submerged atoll located off the southern coast of Belize, approximately 45 km (28 mi) from the mainland. It forms part of the outermost boundary of the Belize Barrier Reef, and is one of its three atolls, besides Turneffe Atoll and Lighthouse Reef.

== Topography ==
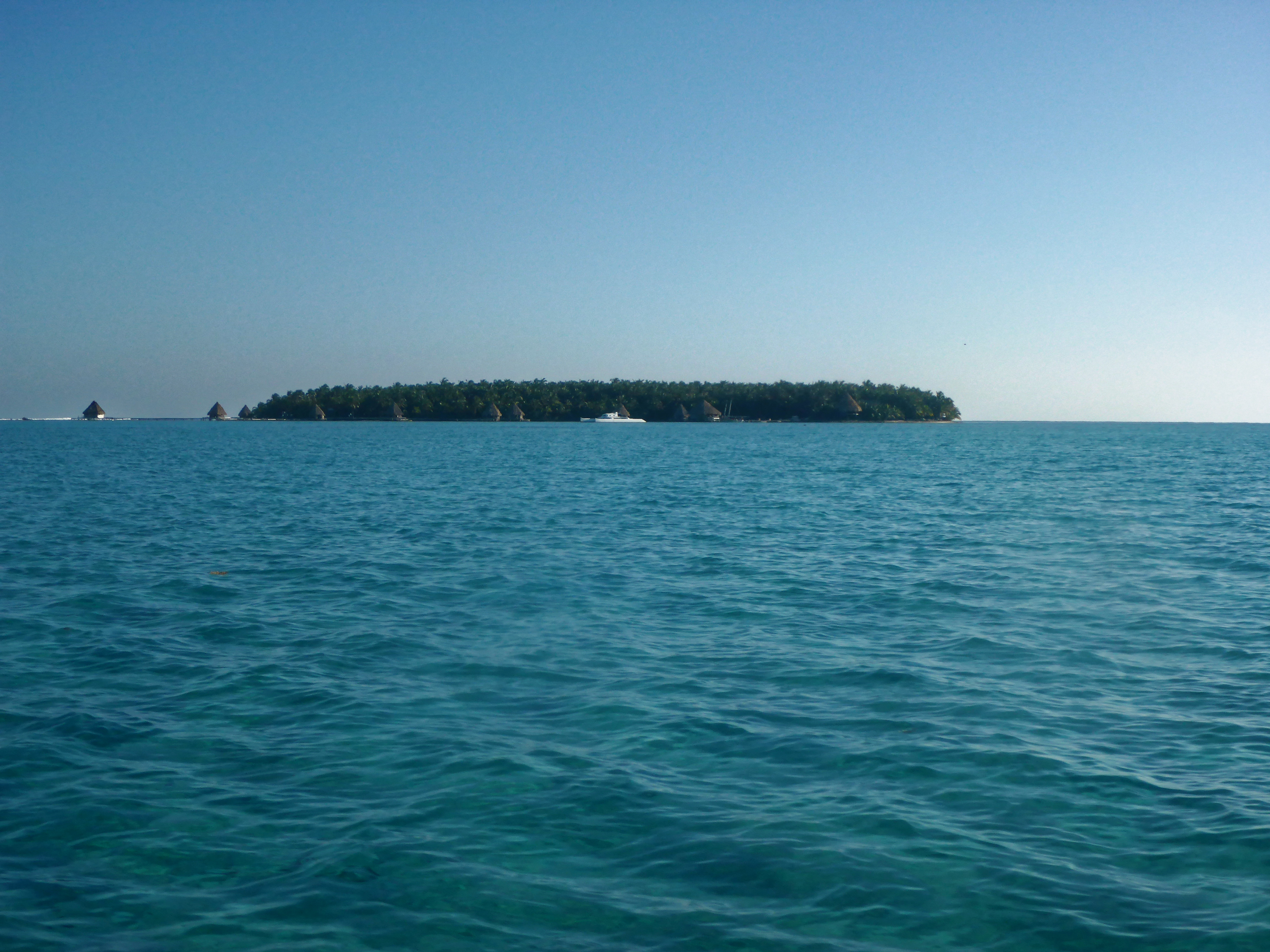
Remote view of Northeast Cay

The oval-shaped atoll is 32 km (20 mi) long and 12 km (7.5 mi) wide. The interior lagoon is dotted with around 850 reef patches and pinnacles rising to the surface. Major cays include Amounme Point Cay, Northeast Cay, Long Cay, Middle Cay and Southwest Cay.

== Ecology ==
Glover's harbours one of the greatest diversity of reef types in the western Caribbean.

A large spawning site for the endangered Nassau grouper (Epinephelus striatus) is located at the northeastern end of the atoll. It has been identified as one of only two viable sites remaining for the species, of nine originally known locations. In 2002, it was declared a special marine reserve, permanently closed to fishing.

== Conservation ==
Glover's Reef Marine Reserve
- IUCN category IV (habitat/species management area)
- Interactive map of Glover's Reef Marine Reserve
- Location: Caribbean Sea, Belize
- Nearest city: Dangriga
- Coordinates: 16.823°N 87.791°W
- Area: 86,653 acres (35,067 hectares)
- Established: 1993

The Glover's Reef Marine Reserve was established as a national protected area in 1993 under the Fisheries Act, and is managed under the Fisheries Department of the Ministry of Agriculture and Fisheries. The reserve encompasses the marine area of the atoll, totaling approximately 86,653 acres (35,067 ha). According to the World Wildlife Fund (WWF), it is considered one of the highest priority areas in the Mesoamerican reef system, providing nursery and feeding areas and a unique habitat for lobster, conch and finfish. In 1996, it was designated by UNESCO as one of seven protected areas that together form the Belize Barrier Reef Reserve System (a World Heritage-listed site).

The marine reserve is currently divided into four different management zones, with each zone having strict regulations defining activities that are permitted and prohibited.

- General Use Zone - 26,170 ha (64,700 acres), 74.6%;
- Conservation Zone - 7,077 ha (17,490 acres), 20.2%;
- Wilderness Zone - 270 ha (670 acres), 0.8%, closed to visitors;
- Seasonal Closure Zone - 1,550 ha (3,800 acres), 4.4%, closed to all fishing from start December to end February. Where this zone overlaps with the grouper spawning aggregation site (below), it is closed to fishing all year round.

A fifth zone has recently been created to offer greater protection to the northeast spawning aggregation site. It largely overlaps with the Seasonal Closure Zone. It is permanently closed to all fishing.

The protected area is considered to be within IUCN's category IV: a Habitat/Species Management Area, with active management targeted at conservation through management intervention.

The Wildlife Conservation Society operates the Glover's Reef Research Station on Middle Cay. It was opened in 1997 for the purpose of promoting and facilitating long-term conservation and management of the wider Belize Barrier Reef complex. Since its opening, the station has hosted more than 200 scientific and research expeditions.

== Important Bird Area ==
A 1.2m ha site off the coast of Belize, comprising the nation’s offshore and barrier islands, has been designated an Important Bird Area (IBA) by BirdLife International because it supports significant populations of several resident, passage or breeding bird species, including white-crowned pigeons, red-footed boobies, roseate terns, Yucatan vireos, black catbirds, and golden-winged and cerulean warblers. The IBA encompasses the South Water Caye, Gladden Spit and Silk Cayes, Sapodilla Cayes and Glover's Reef marine reserves, Half Moon Caye, Laughing Bird Caye and Man-O-War Caye islands, as well as several spawning aggregations.
