= Sandbore Caye =

- Interactive map of Sandbore Caye

Geography
- Location: Caribbean Sea
- Coordinates: 17°27′50″N 87°29′17″W

Administration
- Belize

Additional information
- ISO code: BZ-BZ

Sandbore Caye is a small island with an area of 10 acres (4.0 ha) 50 miles (80 km) off the coast of Belize. It is the northernmost as well as easternmost islet of Lighthouse Reef Atoll, and at the same time the easternmost landmass of the state of Belize. It has a lighthouse occupied by a keeper and his family. The census of 2012 numbered 4. 0.66 miles (1.06 km) to the southwest is the larger island, Northern Caye.
