= Ranguana Caye =

Island in Belize

Coordinates: 16.3325°N 88.1510°W

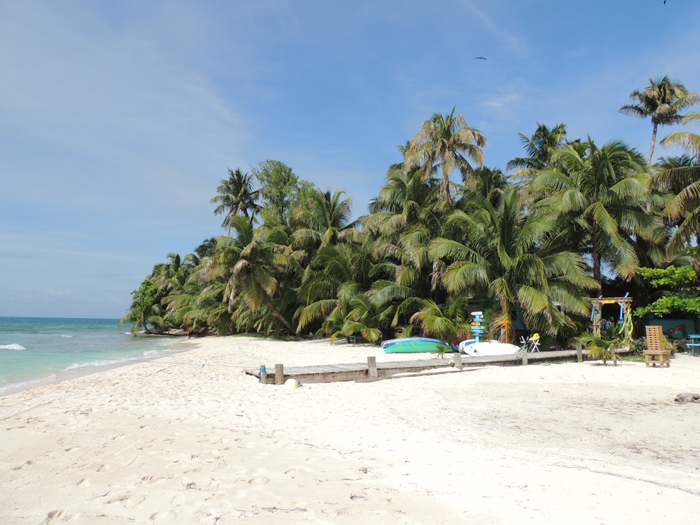
Ranguana Caye, Belize in 2016.

Ranguana Caye is a private island with a total area of two acres, approximately 20 miles west of Placencia, Belize. The island harbors a dock and moorings for visiting boats which is located just off the Belize Barrier Reef. Daytime visits are available through RanguanaCaye.com, and you can spend a night in the cabins located there as well. The island features different activities like paddleboarding in crystal clear water, fishing, kayaking, hammock napping, sunbathing, and playing beach games. The Edge of Paradise Bar & Grill located at the front of the island offers a variety of food and drinks that are freshly made and served throughout the day

== History ==
With the 17th-century origins of Belize traced back to two different myths, it is potentially believed that Ranguana Caye formally called Cayo Renegado, was "the base of the 'renegade' " Spaniard Diego el Mulato."

== Nearby attractions ==
- Placencia Mangroves
- World's Narrowest Mainstreet
- Savannah Forest Station at Paynes Creek
- Laughing Bird Caye
- Marie Sharp's Factory
- Bocawina Falls
- Gulisi Garifuna Museum
- Rosalie's Tortilla Factory
- Drums of Our Father's Monument

== See also ==
- Geography of Belize
- History of Belize
