= Long Caye =

Coordinates: 17.20957°N 87.59327°W

Long Caye is an island 40 miles (64 km) off the coast of Belize. The Caye (comes from Key and is pronounced similar) is only 8 miles (13 km) away from the Great Blue Hole and is located in the same atoll as Lighthouse Reef.
