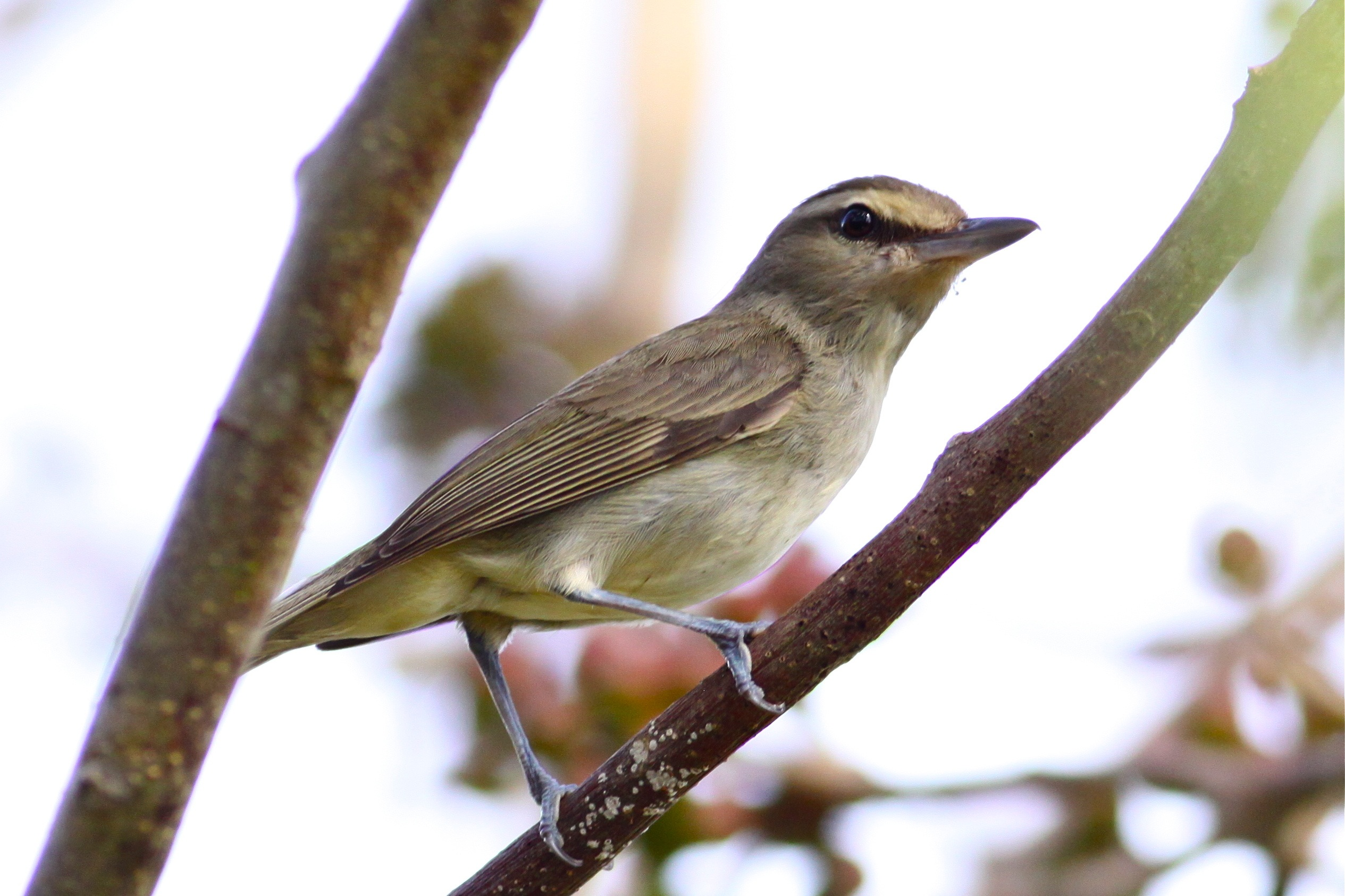

Conservation status
- Least Concern (IUCN 3.1)

Scientific classification
- Kingdom: Animalia
- Phylum: Chordata
- Class: Aves
- Order: Passeriformes
- Family: Vireonidae
- Genus: Vireo
- Species: V. magister

Binomial name
- Vireo magister (Baird, 1871)

= Yucatan vireo =

Species of bird

The Yucatan vireo (Vireo magister) is a species of bird in the family Vireonidae, the vireos, greenlets, and shrike-babblers. It is found on Grand Cayman and in Belize, Honduras, and Mexico. It has once been documented as a vagrant in Texas.

== Taxonomy and systematics ==
The Yucatan vireo was originally described in 1871 as Vireosylvia magister. (Note: Though George Lawrence wrote the article describing the species, he credits it to Spencer Fullerton Baird. The journal issue is dated 1874 but the species description is attributed to 1871.)

The Yucatan vireo's further taxonomy is unsettled. The IOC, AviList, and BirdLife International's Handbook of the Birds of the World assign it these four subspecies:

- V. m. magister (Baird, SF, 1871)
- V. m. decoloratus (Phillips, AR, 1991)
- V. m. stilesi (Phillips, AR, 1991)
- V. m. caymanensis Cory, 1887

However, the Clements taxonomy does not recognize V. m. decoloratus and V. m. stilesi but includes them within the nominate V. m. magister.

The Yucatan vireo, the red-eyed vireo (V. olivaceus) and several other vireos form a superspecies.

This article follows the four-subspecies model.

== Description ==
The Yucatan vireo is about 15 cm (5.9 in) long and weighs about 13.5 to 25 g (0.48 to 0.88 oz). The sexes have the same plumage. Adults of the nominate subspecies V. m. magister have a pale brownish white supercilium and brownish gray lores; the latter color extends to behind the eye. Their crown, nape, and upperparts are dark gray-brown with an olive tinge on the back. Their primaries and secondaries are blackish gray with thin paler olive edges on the outer webs. Their tail is dark brownish gray. Their throat and the center of their breast are buffy white, the sides of their breast grayish, the center of their belly and their vent white, and their flanks and sides grayish with an olive wash. They have a blackish iris, a stout gray bill with a paler gray base to the mandible, and bluish or blue-gray legs and feet.

Subspecies V. m. decoloratus is larger than the nominate with a longer bill and tail, a dark grayish crown, and paler, more whitish, underparts. V. m. stilesi has a brighter and more olive-green rump and edges on the flight feathers than the nominate. V. m. caymanensis is the smallest subspecies. It has olive upperparts with a somewhat brighter rump and slaty brown feet.

== Distribution and habitat ==
The Yucatan vireo has a disjunct distribution. The nominate subspecies has the largest range of the four. It is found in southeastern Mexico's Quintana Roo including Mujeres and Cozumel islands and south along the coast of Belize. Subspecies V. m. decoloratus is found on islands off northern and central Belize. V. m. stilesi is found on islands off southern Belize and northern Honduras. V. m. caymanensis is found on Grand Cayman. There is also a well-documented record of a vagrant at High Island, Texas, in 1984.

The Yucatan vireo inhabits a variety of landscapes in the tropical zone. These include deciduous, secondary, and mangrove forests and scrubby coastal woodlands. In Belize it also inhabits thickets in pine stands on ridges and on Grand Cayman forest on limestone soils.

== Behavior ==
=== Movement ===
The Yucatan vireo is a year-round resident.

=== Feeding ===
The Yucatan vireo's diet is nearly unknown, though it is believed to feed mostly on fruit on Grand Cayman. It forages "quietly and secretively" at all levels of its habitat.

=== Breeding ===
The Yucatan vireo's breeding season has not been fully defined but spans April to August on Grand Cayman and includes April and May in Belize. Its nest is a deep cup suspended from a branch fork. The clutch is two eggs that are white with a few dark spots. The incubation period, time to fledging, and details of parental care are not known.

=== Vocalization ===
On Grand Cayman the Yucatan vireo sings a "two-note whistle whoi whu and 3-syllable sweet, brid-get". In Belize it sings "a rich warble, evenly paced...cheer up sweet or cheer up why not sweet" A variation there is "beer-here alright!-wheo". Its calls include "a soft, dry shi-tchi-chi-chi chatter, a low, frequently repeated bik-bik, and a wik like that of a woodpecker".

== Status ==
The IUCN has assessed the Yucatan vireo as being of Least Concern. Its estimated population of 20,000 to 50,000 mature individuals is believed to be decreasing. No immediate threats have been identified. It is considered common on the islands off Belize and Honduras and "fairly common but local" on the Belize mainland. It is fairly common on Grand Cayman. The "[s]tatus of island races [is] not well known [and] most likely to be of concern."
