= Tourism in Belize =

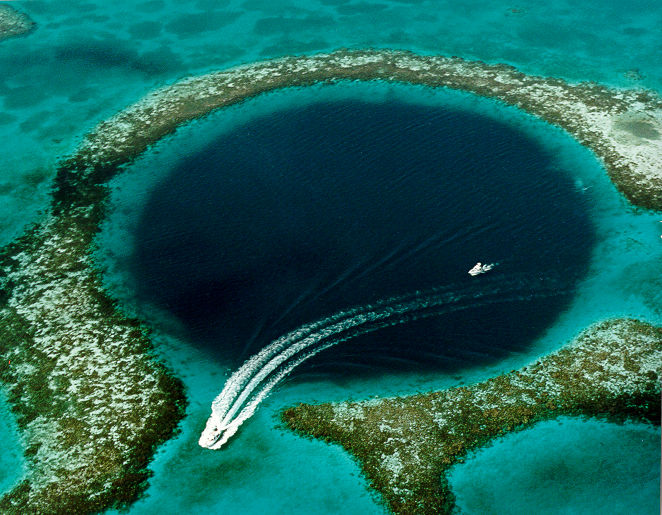
The Great Blue Hole is a prime ecotourism destination. A World Heritage Site, ranked among the top 10 nominees for the world's New 7 Wonders of Nature.

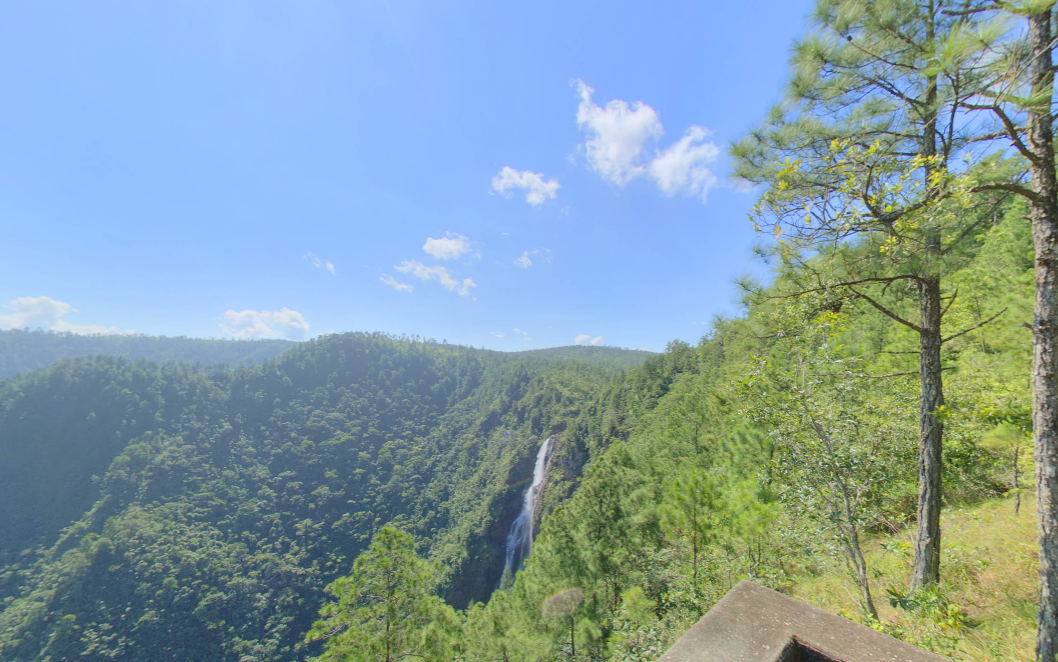
Thousand Foot Falls actually stand at about 1,600 feet high. It is the highest waterfall in Central America.

Tourism in Belize is a major industry in the country. The sector has grown in the 2020s, with international arrivals reportedly increasing 30% in 2024, the highest rate in the Caribbean. Former Prime Minister Dean Barrow stated his intention to use tourism to combat poverty throughout the country.

The growth in tourism has positively affected the agricultural, commercial, and finance industries, as well as the construction industry. The results for Belize's tourism-driven economy have been significant, with the nation welcoming almost one million tourists in a calendar year for the first time in its history in 2012.

== History ==
Prior to its independence in 1981, Belize was not regarded as a tourist destination due to an inadequate infrastructure. However, rapid expansion of the tourist industry over the last decade has made it the nation's second largest industry.

Belize has large array of diverse tourist, adventure tourist, and eco-tourist attractions. The Belize Barrier Reef (second largest in the world), over 450 offshore Cayes (islands), excellent fishing, safe waters for windsurfing, swimming, cave rafting, boating, paddleboarding, scuba diving, and snorkelling, numerous rivers for rafting, and kayaking, various jungle and wildlife reserves of fauna and flora, for hiking, bird watching, and helicopter touring, as well as many Maya ruins, support the thriving tourism and ecotourism industry. Of the hundreds of cave systems, Belize also holds the largest cave system in Central America, 544 species of birds, and well-preserved natural beauty. Despite all this, it is still among the least visited countries in the region.

== Statistics ==
In 2024 there were about 500,000 tourist arrivals.

Tourist arrivals of 2023 in %

== Government promotion of tourism ==
Development costs are high, but the Government of Belize has designated tourism as its second development priority after agriculture. In 2012, tourist arrivals totalled 917,869 (with about 584,683 from the U.S.) and tourist receipts amounted to over $1.3 billion.

Tourism is the domain of the Ministry of Tourism, within which the Belize Tourism Board works as a link between the private and public sector.

== Economic ==
The tourism industry is an important part of the economy of Belize, in 2007 contributing to over 25% of all jobs, and making up over 18% of the GDP. This constituted 590 million BZD (295 million USD), according to the Belize government, up 90 million BZD (45 million USD) from the year before. Important tourist attractions in Belize include the natural attractions of land and sea, making the areas important in Ecotourism, as well as the historic ruins of Belize's Pre-Columbian Maya civilization.

== Tourist destinations ==
Popular tourist destinations include San Pedro Town and Caye Caulker, both located about 70 km and 40 km east off the coast of Belize, both situation only a few miles from the Barrier Reef at any point. They have been regarded as a "tropical paradises" by the Los Angeles Times. Cruise ships have been docking in Belize City, and average 850,000 tourists alone every year, some who partake in tours to nearby districts as well as the colonial city.

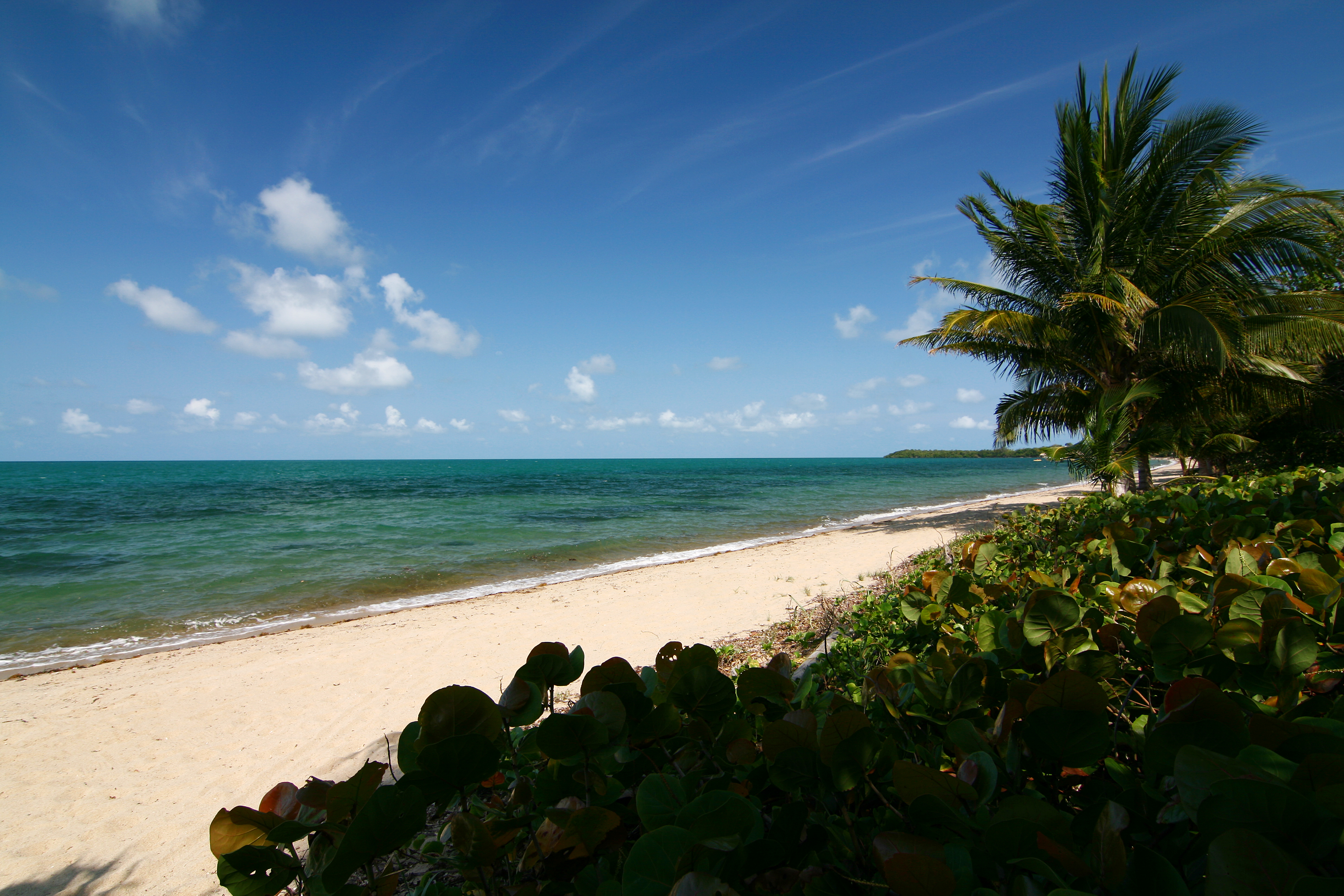
Almond Beach, Hopkins

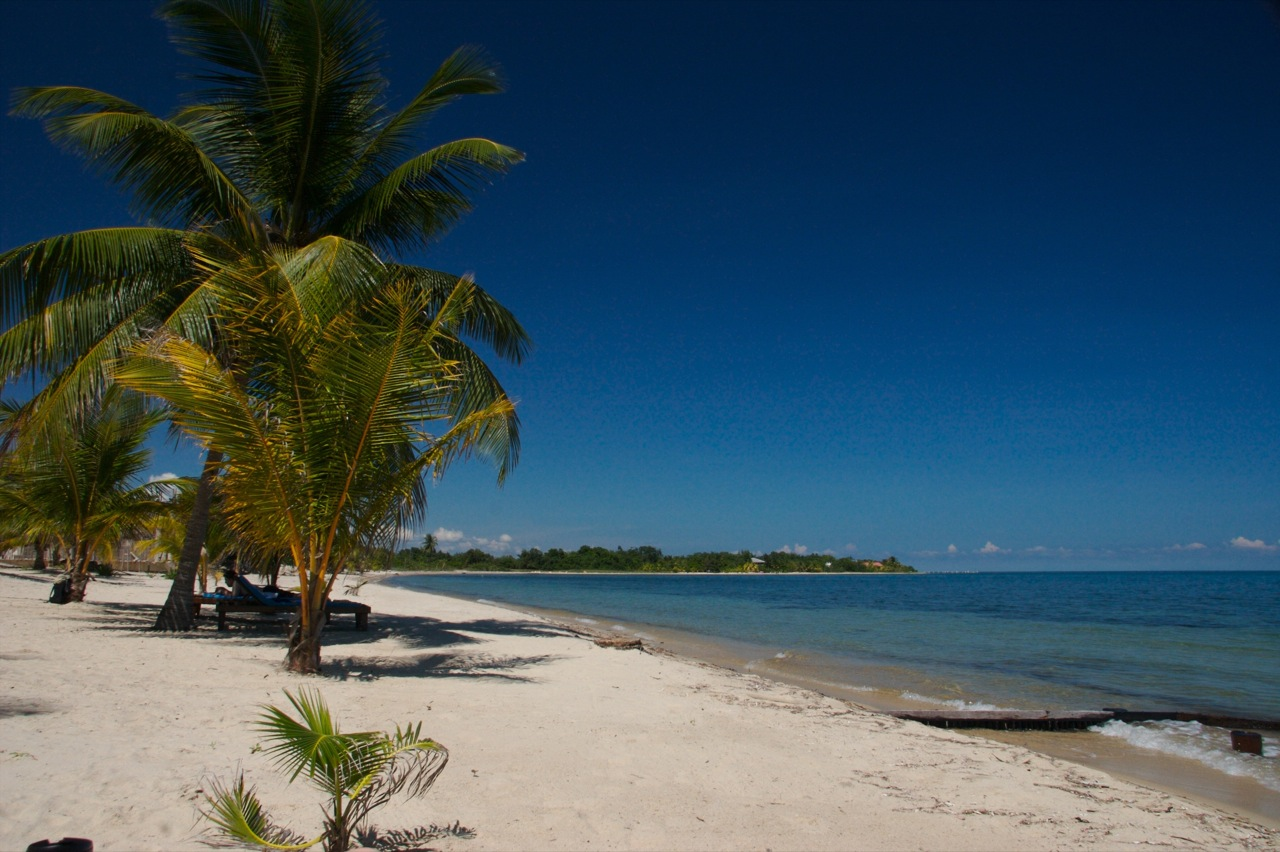
Maya Beach, Placencia

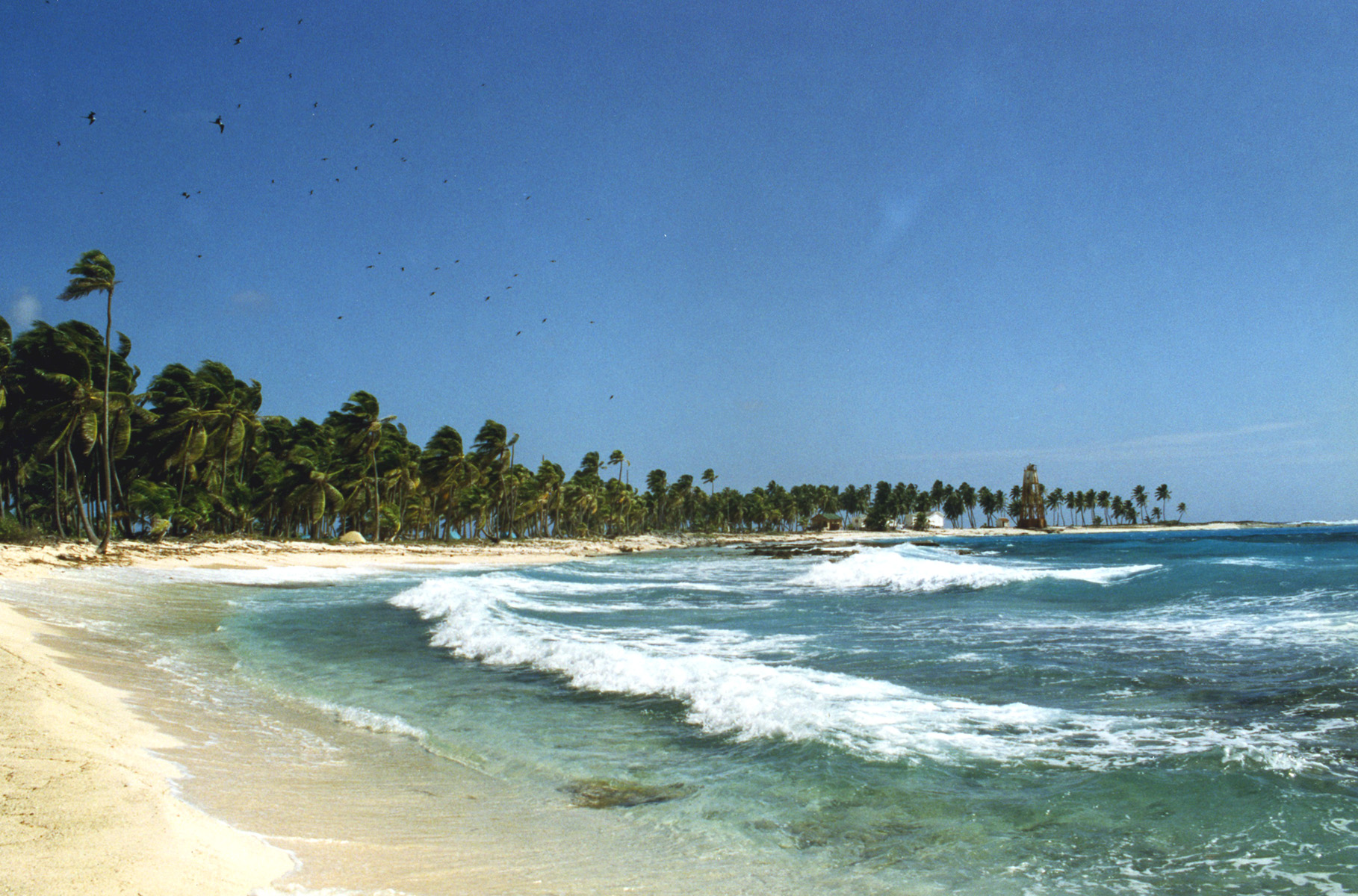
Half Moon Caye

=== Mainland beaches ===
- Almond Beach, Hopkins
- Maya Beach, Placencia
- Sabal Beach, Punta Negra
- Sarteneja
- Orchid Bay, Corozal
- Monkey River Beach
- Cerros Beach (A mini Tulum)
- Cucumber Beach, Mile 4, Western Highway
- Gales Point Lagoon
- Honey Camp Lagoon

=== Popular cayes ===
- San Pedro Town, Ambergris Caye
- Caye Caulker
- Coco Plum Island
- Half Moon Caye
- Laughing Bird Caye
- Goff's Caye
- St. George's Caye
- Tobacco Caye
- Blackadore Caye
- Caye Chapel
- Sapodilla Cayes

=== Rural and community-based tourism ===
Many privately run companies have cooperatives in Southern Belize that manage a rural and community-based tourism project, which has been developed with support from the UNESCO. Tourism allows otherwise marginalized minorities such as the Maya and the Garifuna people to receive new opportunities in alternative markets, harvest crops, preserve and involve foreigners in their culture and diversify their income. Many companies offer visitors the opportunity to visit a cacao, cashew farm, learn about Maya, Kriol or Garifuna craftsmanship, and even to stay overnight on a Maya, Kriol or Garifuna village and explore with a community guide.

=== Ecological tourism ===
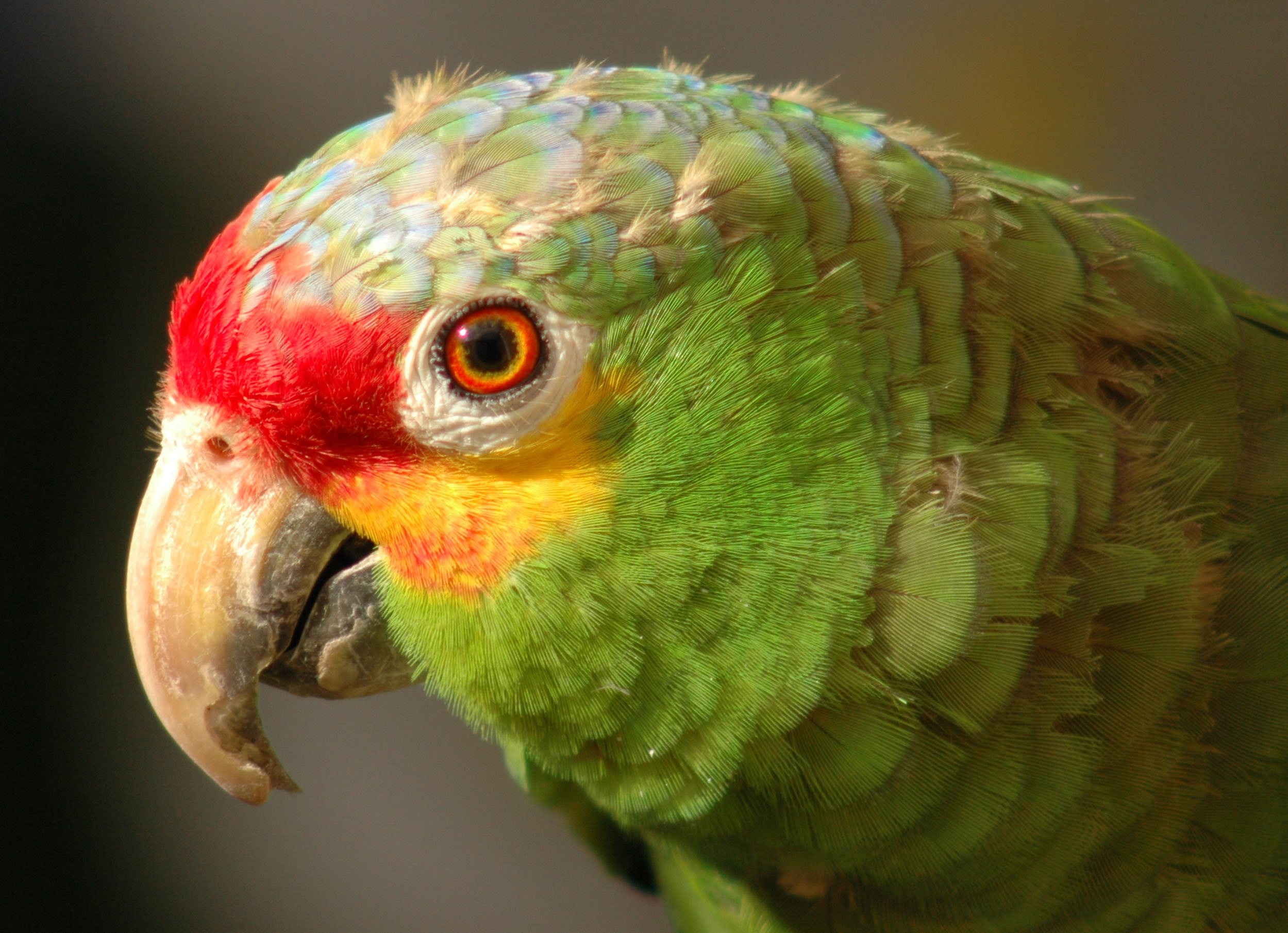
Biodiversity is an asset for ecotourism. A red-lored amazon

Eco-tourism aims to be ecologically and socially conscious, it focuses on local culture, wilderness, and adventure. Belize's eco-tourism is growing with every passing year, it boasts a number of eco-tourist tours and energy efficient hotels, with environmentally-conscious and renewable resources. Popular eco-tourism destinations in Belize include the Cockscomb Basin Wildlife Sanctuary, Mountain Pine Ridge Forest Reserve, Swallow Caye Wildlife Sanctuary, and the Community Baboon Sanctuary.

=== Waterfalls ===
- Antelope Falls in Mayflower Bocawina National Park
- Mayflower Bocawina Falls in Mayflower Bocawina National Park
- Big Rock Falls in the Mountain Pine Ridge Forest Reserve of the Cayo District
- Butterfly Falls in the Mountain Pine Ridge Forest Reserve of the Cayo District
- Five Sisters Falls in the Mountain Pine Ridge Forest Reserve of the Cayo District
- Rio Blanco Falls
- Rio On Pools
- San Antonio Falls
- Thousand Foot Falls 150-foot (46 m) in the Mountain Pine Ridge Forest Reserve of the Cayo District

== Archaeological reserves ==
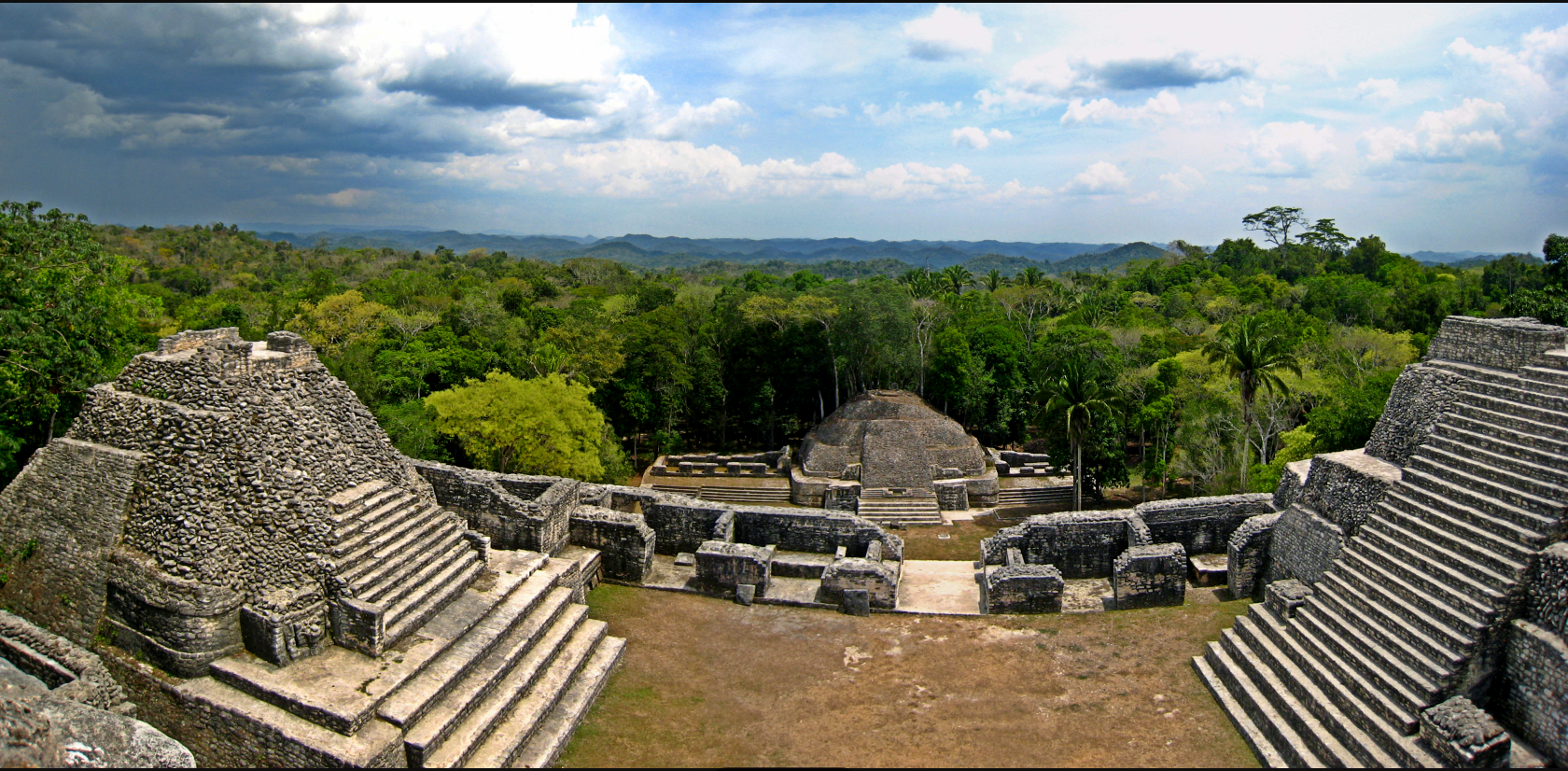
Overlooking the Caracol ruins, the most extensive archaeological site in the country.

Before the arrival of Europeans in America, Belize lay in the heartland of the Maya civilisation, and consequently contains some of the earliest and most important Maya ruins. Archaeological findings at Caracol, in the southern end of the country, have suggested that it formed the centre of political struggles in the southern Maya lowlands. The complex covered an area much larger than present-day Belize City and supported more than twice the modern city's population. Meanwhile, Lamanai, in the north, is known for being the longest continually-occupied site in Mesoamerica, settled during the early Preclassic era and continuously occupied up to and during the area's colonisation.

While the majority of reserves under this category are related to the pre-colonial era, Serpon Sugar Mill and Yarborough Cemetery, both designated in 2009, only date from the 19th century and are alternatively described as historical reserves.

The country's 15 archaeological sites are managed by the Institute of Archaeology, a branch of the National Institute of Culture and History (NICH), which comes under the authority of the Ministry of Tourism, Civil Aviation and Culture. This type of protected area was gazetted under the Ancient Monuments and Antiquities Act, 1 May 1972. All of the following reserves are open to the public. Many other sites, such as Cuello and Uxbenka, are located on private land and can only be visited if prior permission is obtained from the landowner.

=== List of Maya ruins in Belize ===
The following is a list of other archaeological sites located within Belize:

- Actun Tunichil Muknal
- Altun Ha
- Baking Pot
- Barton Creek Cave
- Cahal Pech
- Caracol
- Cerros
- Chaa Creek
- Colha
- Cuello
- El Pilar
- Ka'Kabish
- K'axob
- La Milpa
- Lamanai
- Louisville
- Lubaantun
- Marco Gonzalez
- Nim Li Punit
- Nohmul
- Nohoch Che'en
- Pusilha
- San Estevan
- Santa Rita, Corozal
- Serpon sugar mill
- Tipu
- Uxbenka
- Xnaheb
- Xunantunich

== Main natural attractions ==
Roughly 26% (2.6 million acres, or 1.22 million hectares) of Belizean land and sea is preserved within a total of 95 reserves, which vary in their purpose and level of protection. This network of protected areas exists under a variety of management structures:

=== National parks ===
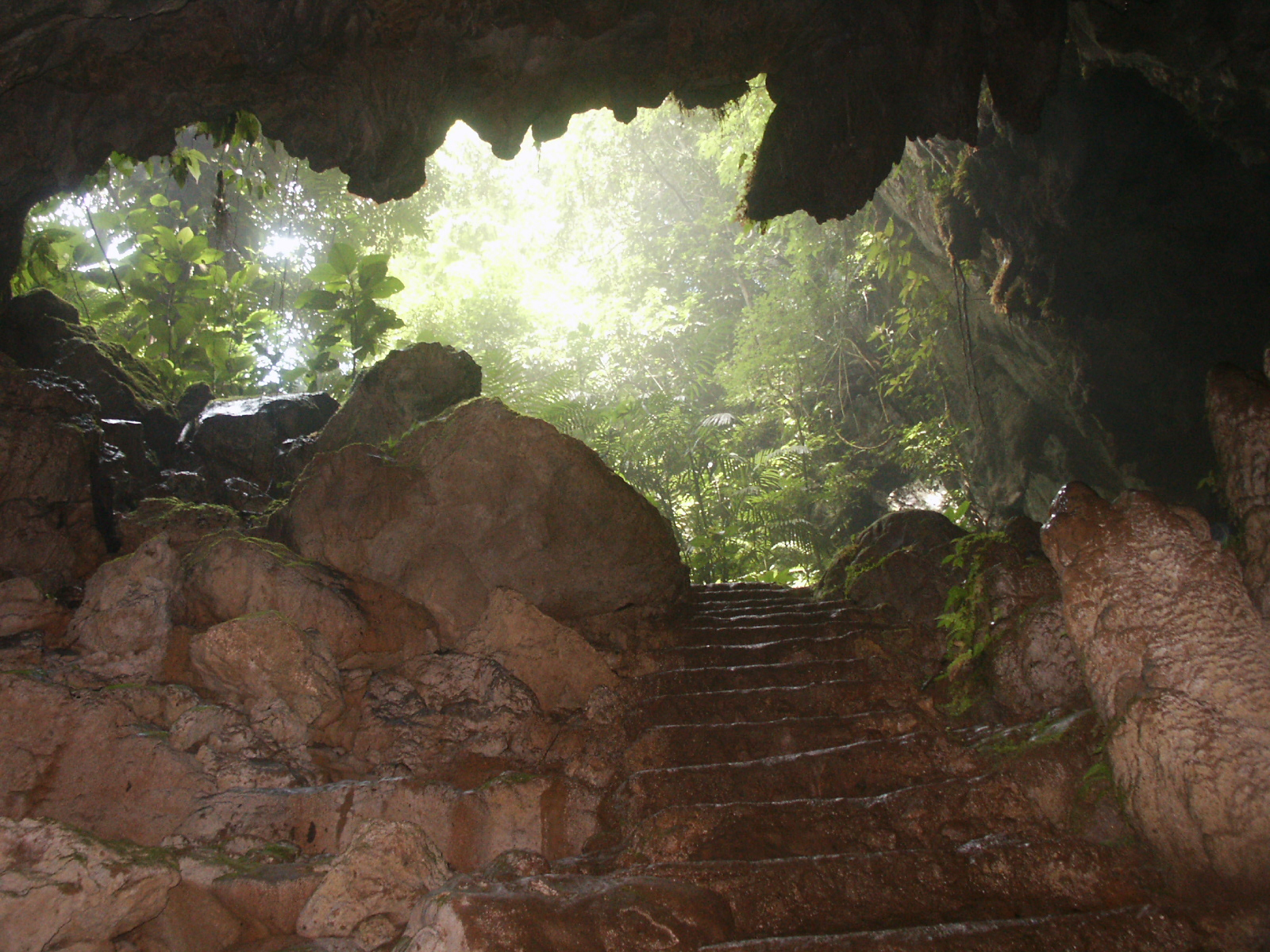
St. Herman's Cave in St. Herman's Blue Hole National Park.

In Belize, national parks are areas designed for the protection and preservation of natural and aesthetic features of national significance for the benefit and enjoyment of the people. Therefore, they are areas of recreation and tourism, as well as environmental protection. National parks are gazetted under the National Parks System Act of 1981. They are administered by the Forest Department and managed through partnership agreements with community-based non-governmental organisations.

List of national parks
Reserve	District	Size (ha)	Size (acres)	IUCN	Co-management	Est.	Description
Aguas Turbias	Orange Walk	3,541	8,750	II	— (Note: There is no current co-management partner, nor on-site presence, though the area has been included in past conservation planning under Programme for Belize.)	1994	
Bacalar Chico	Belize	4,510	11,100	V	Green Reef Environmental Institute (Note: Prospective co-management organisation. No formal co-management agreements are currently being made, but these organisations have informal co-management authority.)	1996	Excludes adjacent marine reserve.
Billy Barquedier	Stann Creek	663	1,640	II	Steadfast Tourism and Conservation Association	2001	
Chiquibul	Cayo	106,839	264,000	II	Friends for Conservation and Development	1995	Excludes adjacent forest reserve.
Five Blues Lake	Cayo	1,643	4,060	II	Friends of Five Blues Lake National Park	1994	
Gra Gra Lagoon	Stann Creek	534	1,320	II	Friends of Gra Gra Lagoon	2002	
Guanacaste	Cayo	23	57	II	Belize Audubon Society	1994	
Honey Camp	Corozal / Orange Walk	3,145	7,770	II	Association of Friends of Freshwater Creek (Note: No longer active.)	2001	
Laughing Bird Caye	Stann Creek	4,095	10,120	II	Southern Environmental Association	1996	
Mayflower Bocawina	Stann Creek	2,868	7,090	II	Friends of Mayflower Bocawina National Park	2001	
Monkey Bay	Belize	859	2,120	II	Guardians of the Jewel	1994	
Nojkaaxmeen Elijio Panti	Cayo	5,130	12,700	II	Belize Development Foundation (Note: Until 2010, co-management was held by the Itzamna Society.)	2001	
Payne's Creek	Toledo	14,739	36,420	II	Toledo Institute for Development and Environment	1994	
Peccary Hills	Belize	4,260	10,500	II	Gracie Rock Reserve for Adventure, Culture and Ecotourism	2007	
Río Blanco	Toledo	38	94	II	Río Blanco Mayan Association	1994	
Sarstoon-Temash	Toledo	16,938	41,850	II	Sarstoon Temash Institute for Indigenous Management	1994	Ramsar site.
St. Herman's Blue Hole	Stann Creek	269	660	II	Belize Audubon Society	1986	

=== Natural monuments ===
A natural monument is designated for the preservation of unique geographic features of the landscape. The designation is primarily based on a feature's high scenic value, but may also be regarded as a cultural landmark that represents or contributes to a national identity.

Natural monuments are gazetted under the National Parks System Act of 1981; marine-based monuments additionally come under the Fisheries Act. Of the five natural monuments in the country, three are terrestrial, administered by the Forest Department, while the remaining two are marine-based and come under the authority of the Fisheries Department.

List of natural monuments
Image	Reserve	District	Size (ha)	Size (acres)	IUCN	Co-management	Est.	Description
	Actun Tunichil Muknal	Cayo	185	460	Ia	Belize Audubon Society; Institute of Archaeology	2004	Terrestrial.
	Blue Hole	Belize	414	1,020	III	Belize Audubon Society	1996	Marine.
	Half Moon Caye	Belize	3,954	9,770	II	Belize Audubon Society	1982	Marine.
	Thousand Foot Falls	Cayo	522	1,290	III	— (Note: Managed directly by the Forest Department as part of the Mountain Pine Ridge Forest Reserve.)	2004	Terrestrial.
	Victoria Peak	Stann Creek	1,959	4,840	III	Belize Audubon Society	1998	Terrestrial.

=== Nature reserves ===
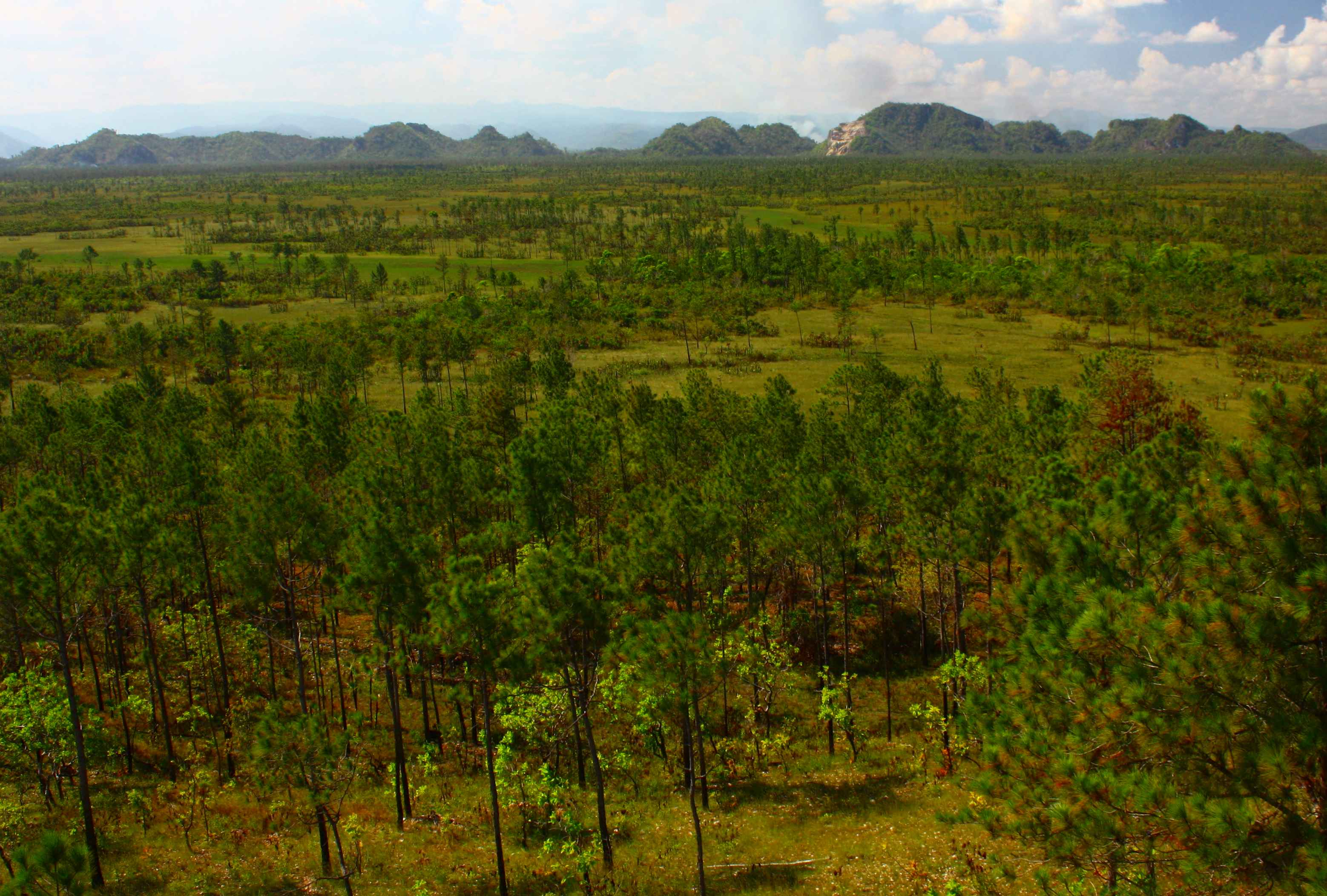
Wilderness scene in the Bladen Nature Reserve.

The country's three nature reserves enjoy the highest level of protection within the national protected areas system. The designation was created for the strict protection of biological communities or ecosystems, and the maintenance of natural processes in an undisturbed state. They are typically pristine, wilderness ecosystems.

Nature reserves are legislated under the National Parks System Act of 1981. It is the strictest designation of all categories within the country's national protected areas system, with no extractive use or tourism access permitted. Permits are required to enter the area and are restricted to researchers only. The nature reserves are under the authority of the Forest Department.

The oldest of these, Bladen Nature Reserve, forms the centrepiece of the Maya Mountains biological corridor, and is considered one of the most biodiversity-rich, and topographically unique areas within the Mesoamerican biodiversity hotspot.

List of nature reserves
Reserve	District	Size (ha)	Size (acres)	IUCN	Co-management	Est.	Description
Bladen	Toledo	40,411	99,860	Ia	Ya’axché Conservation Trust; Bladen Management Consortium	1990	
Burdon Canal	Belize	2,126	5,250	Ia	— (Note: Currently has no co-management partner and is managed directly by the Forest Department, though with no on-site presence. It is considered a paper park.)	1992	
Tapir Mountain	Cayo	2,550	6,300	Ia	Belize Audubon Society	1994	Formerly known as Society Hall Nature Reserve.

=== Wildlife sanctuaries ===
Wildlife sanctuaries are created for the preservation of an important keystone species in the ecosystem. By preserving enough area for them to live in, many other species receive the protection they need as well.

Wildlife sanctuaries are gazetted under the National Parks System Act of 1981, and are the responsibility of the Forest Department. There are currently seven wildlife sanctuaries, three of which are being managed under co-management partnerships, whilst the other four are managed under informal arrangements. Two of the following wildlife sanctuaries are considered to be marine protected areas, and may also have collaborative agreements with the Fisheries Department in place.

List of wildlife sanctuaries
Reserve	District	Size (ha)	Size (acres)	IUCN	Co-management	Est.	Description
Aguacaliente	Toledo	2,213	5,470	IV	Aguacaliente Management Team	1998	Terrestrial.
Cockscomb Basin	Stann Creek / Toledo	49,477	122,260	IV	Belize Audubon Society	1997	Terrestrial.
Corozal Bay	Belize / Corozal	73,049	180,510	IV	Sarteneja Alliance for Conservation and Development	1998	Marine.
Crooked Tree	Belize / Orange Walk	15,372	37,990	IV	Belize Audubon Society	1984	Ramsar site. Boundaries ill defined. Terrestrial.
Gales Point	Belize	3,681	9,100	IV	Gales Point Wildlife Sanctuary Community Management Committee	1998	Terrestrial.
Spanish Creek	Belize / Orange Walk	2,428	6,000	IV	Rancho Dolores Development Group	2002	Terrestrial.
Swallow Caye	Belize	3,631	8,970	IV	Friends of Swallow Caye	2002	Marine.

=== Forest reserves ===
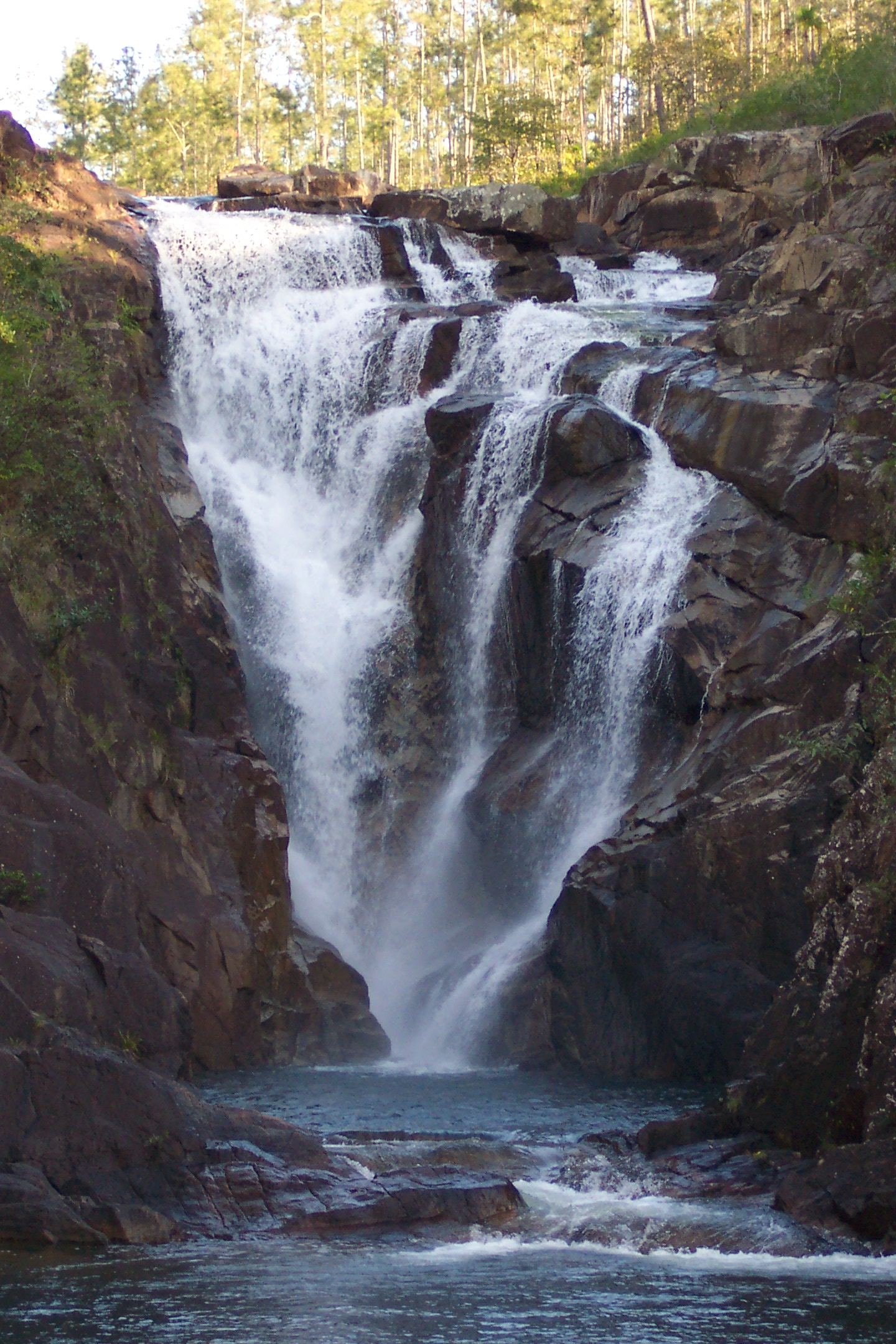
Big Rock Falls in the Mountain Pine Ridge Forest Reserve.

Forest reserves, overseen by the Forest Department, are designed for the sustainable extraction of timber without destroying the biodiversity of the location. These are gazetted under the Forests Act of 1927, which allows the department to grant permits to logging companies after extensive review. There are currently 16 forest reserves with a combined acreage of 380,328 hectares (939,810 acres), making up 9.3% of total national territory.

List of forest reserves
Reserve	District	Size (ha)	Size (acres)	IUCN	Est.	Description
Caye Caulker	Belize	38	94	VI	1998	Excludes adjacent marine reserve.
Chiquibul	Cayo	59,822	147,820	VI	1995	Excludes adjacent national park.
Columbia River	Cayo / Toledo	60,016	148,300	VI	1997	
Deep River	Toledo	27,232	67,290	VI		
Fresh Water Creek	Corozal / Orange Walk	13,513	33,390	VI	1926	
Grants Work	Stann Creek	3,199	7,900	VI	1989	
Machaca	Toledo	1,253	3,100	VI	1998	
Manatee	Belize / Stann Creek	36,621	90,490	VI	1959	
Mango Creek	Stann Creek / Toledo	12,090	29,900	VI	1989	Comprises two separate segments.
Monkey Caye	Toledo	669	1,650	VI	1996	
Mountain Pine Ridge	Cayo	43,372	107,170	VI	1944	
Maya Mountain	Stann Creek	16,887	41,730	VI	1997	
Sibun	Cayo	32,849	81,170	VI	1959	
Sittee River	Stann Creek	37,360	92,300	VI		
Swasey Bladen	Toledo	5,980	14,800	VI	1989	
Vaca	Cayo	14,118	34,890	VI	1991	

=== Marine reserves ===
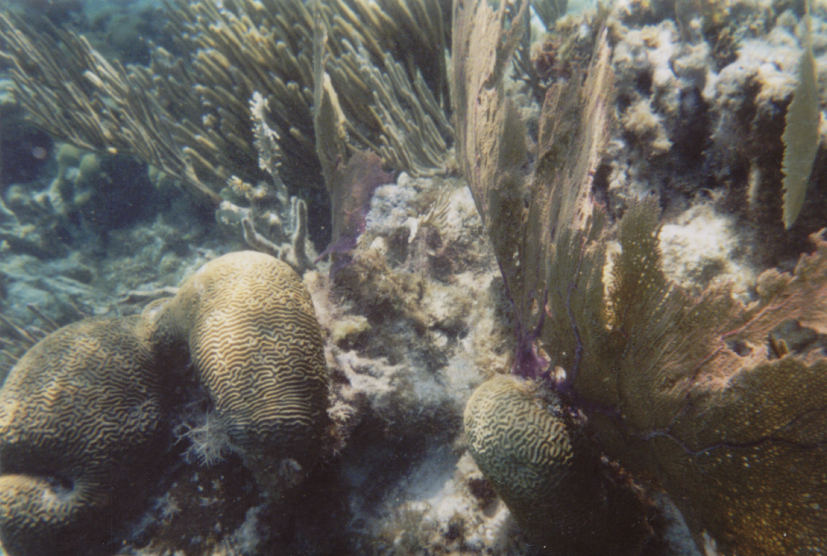
Coral patch in the Hol Chan Marine Reserve.

Marine reserves are designed for the conservation of aquatic ecosystems, including marine wildlife and its environment. The majority of these reserves contribute to the conservation of Belize's Barrier Reef, which provides a protective shelter for pristine atolls, seagrass meadows and rich marine life. The preservation of the Barrier Reef system has been recognised as a global interest through the collective designation of seven protected areas, including four of the following marine reserves, as a World Heritage Site.

Marine reserves are legislated under the Fisheries Act, and are administered by the Fisheries Department. One of the department's key responsibilities is to ensure the sustainable extraction of marine resources. There are currently eight marine reserves, management of which is either direct, by the department, or in partnership with non-governmental agencies.

List of marine reserves
Reserve	District	Size (ha)	Size (acres)	IUCN	Co-management	Est.	Description
Bacalar Chico	Belize	6,391	15,790	IV	Green Reef Environmental Institute	1996	Excludes adjacent national park. Divided into two zones: a conservation zone, and a general use zone.
Caye Caulker	Belize	3,913	9,670	VI	Forest & Marine Reserves Association of Caye Caulker	1998	Excludes adjacent forest reserve.
Gladden Spit and Silk Cayes	Stann Creek	10,514	25,980	IV	Southern Environmental Association	2000	Divided into two zones: a general use zone, and a conservation zone.
Glover's Reef	Belize	86,653	214,120	IV	—	1993	In 2001, the reserve was divided into four zones: a general use zone, a conservation zone, a seasonal closure zone, and a wilderness zone. A spawning aggregation zone was broken off in 2003 and comes under separate management (see below).
Hol Chan	Belize	1,444	3,570	II	Hol Chan Trust Fund	1987	Divided into four zones: Mangrove, Seagrass, Shark Ray Alley, and Coral Reef.
Port Honduras	Toledo	40,470	100,000	IV	Toledo Institute for Development and Environment	2000	Divided into two zones: a general use zone, and a conservation zone.
Sapodilla Cayes	Toledo	15,618	38,590	IV	Southern Environmental Association	1996	
South Water Caye	Stann Creek	47,702	117,870	IV	—	1996	

== Gallery ==
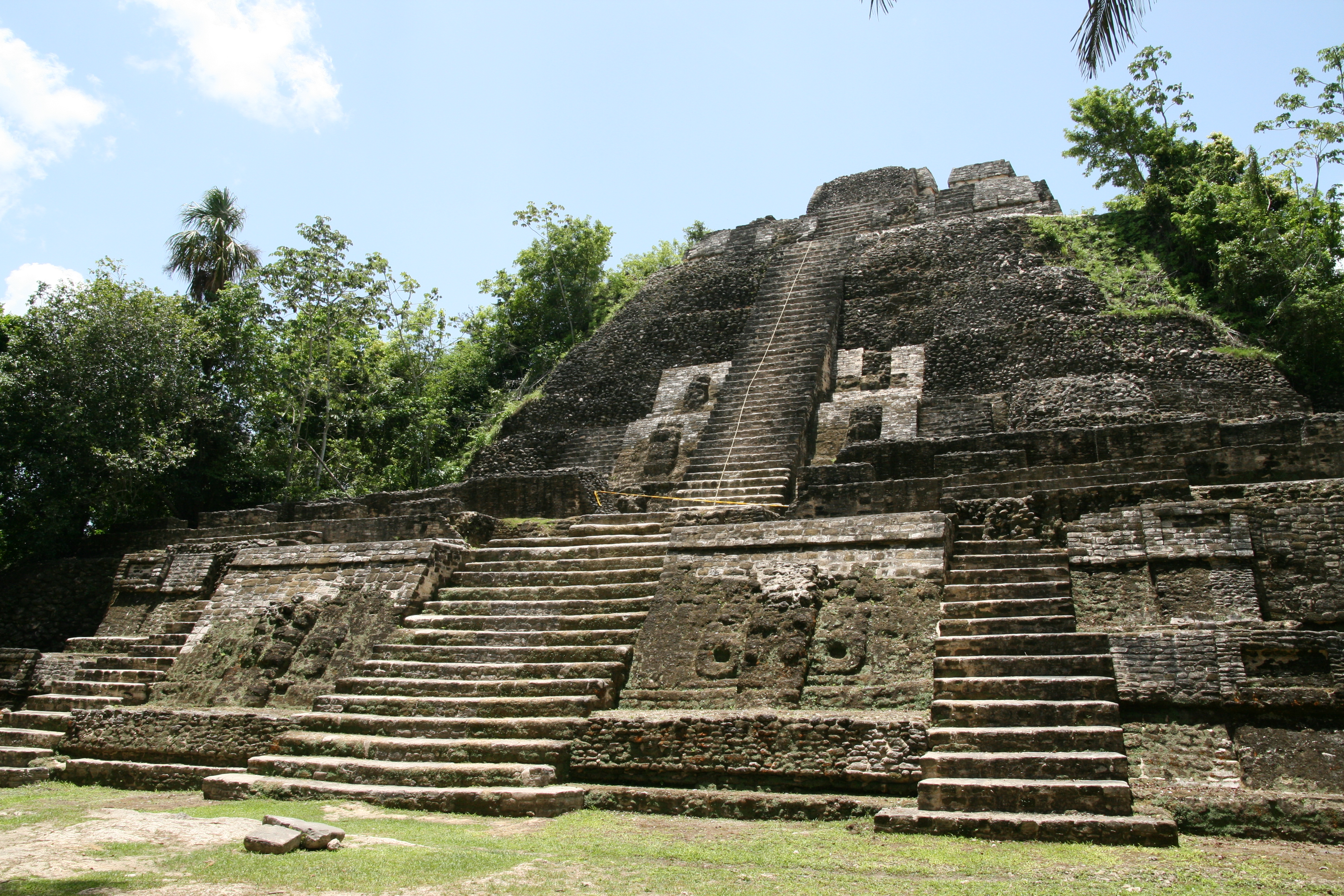
High Temple at Lamanai

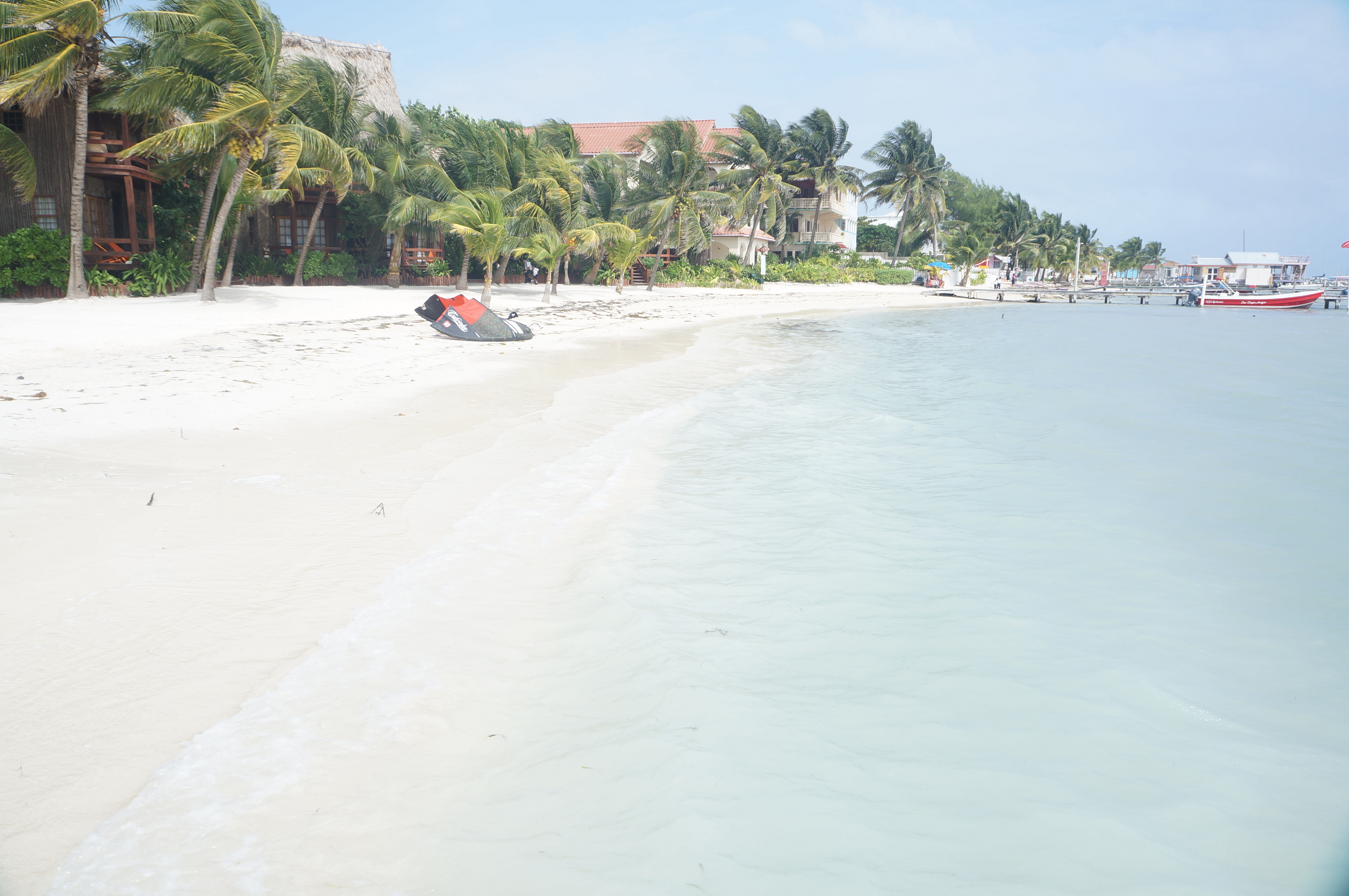
Beachront of Ramon's Village, San Pedro Town, Ambergris Caye

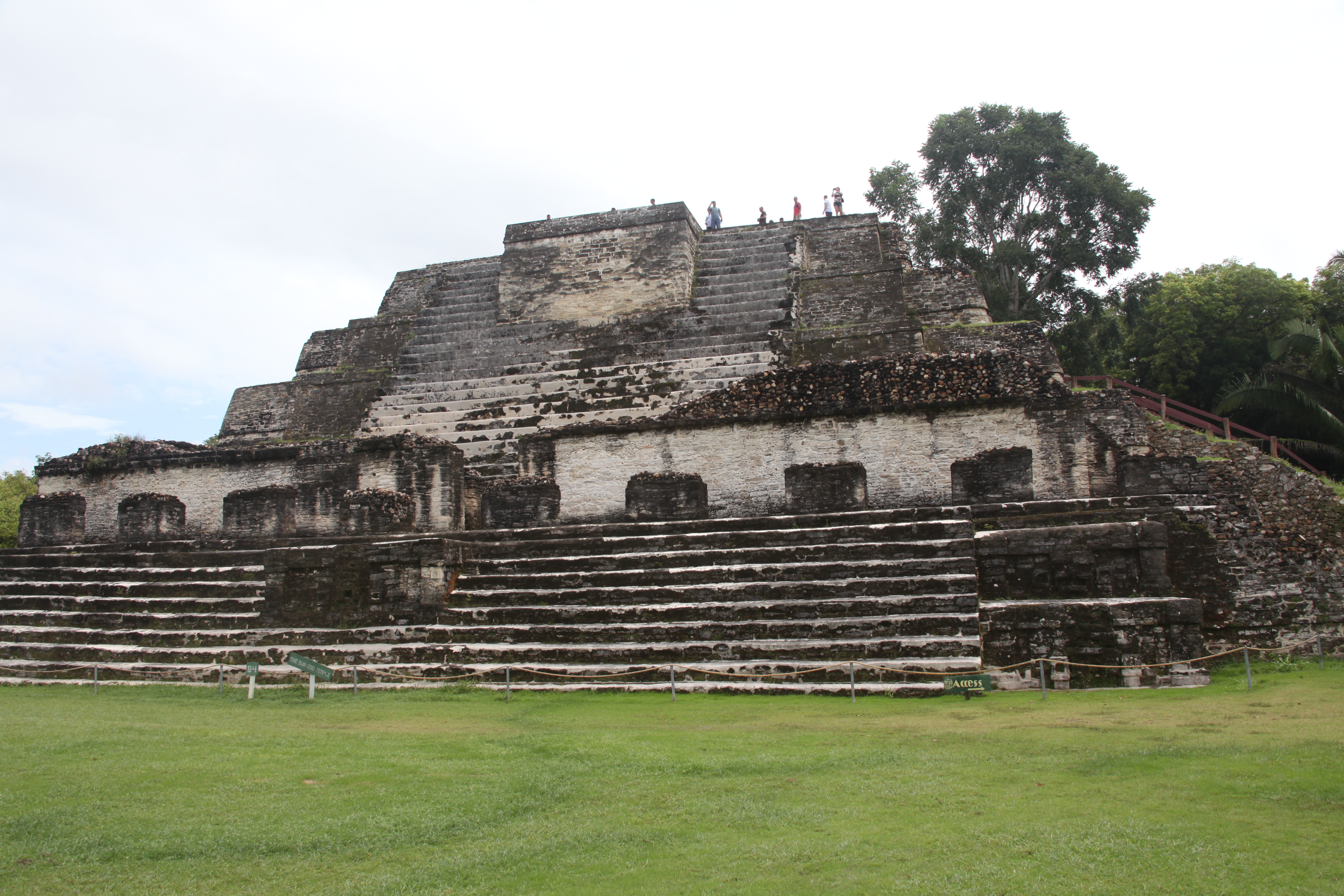
High Temple at Altun Ha

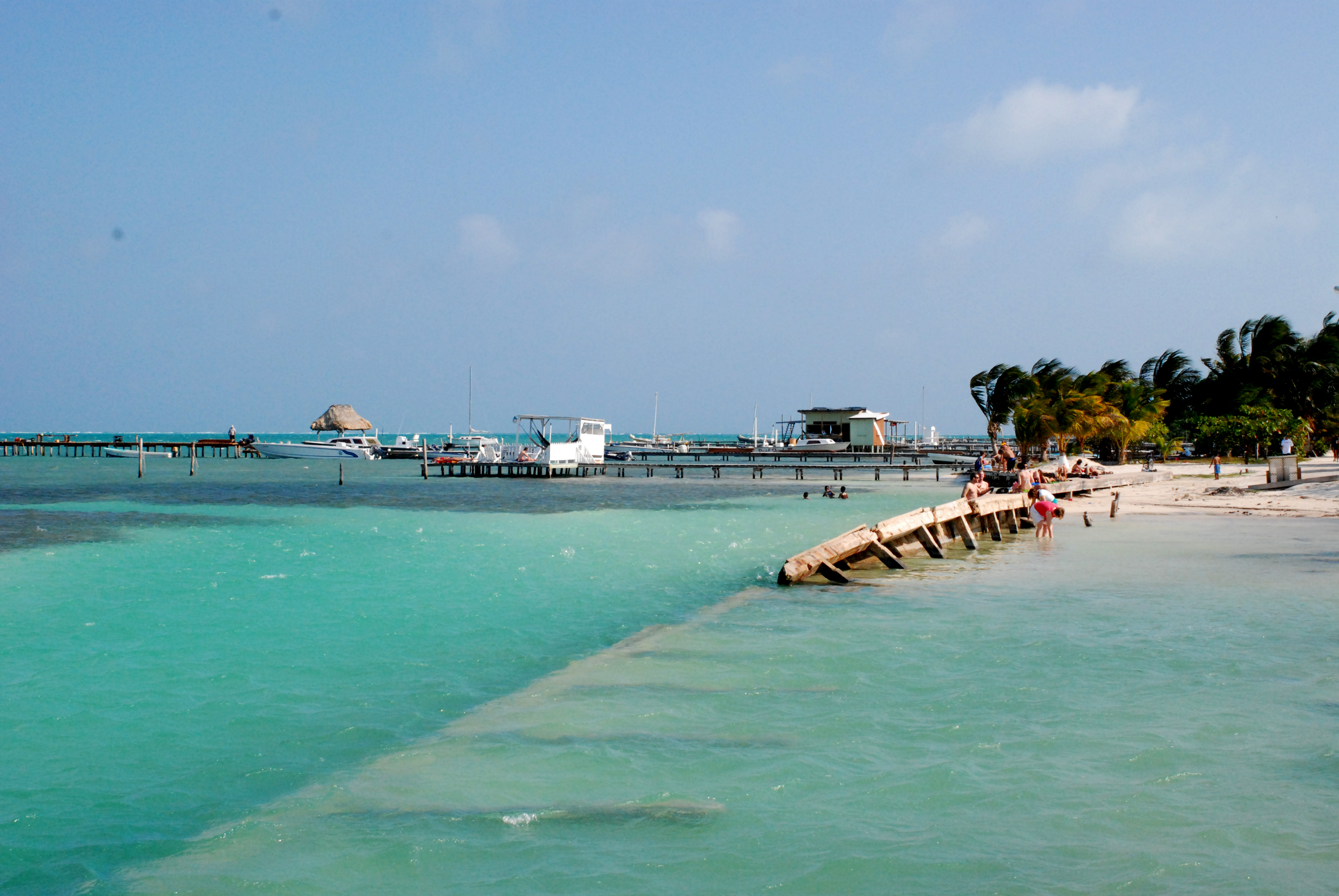
The "Split" at Caye Caulker, Caused by Hurricane Hattie in 1961

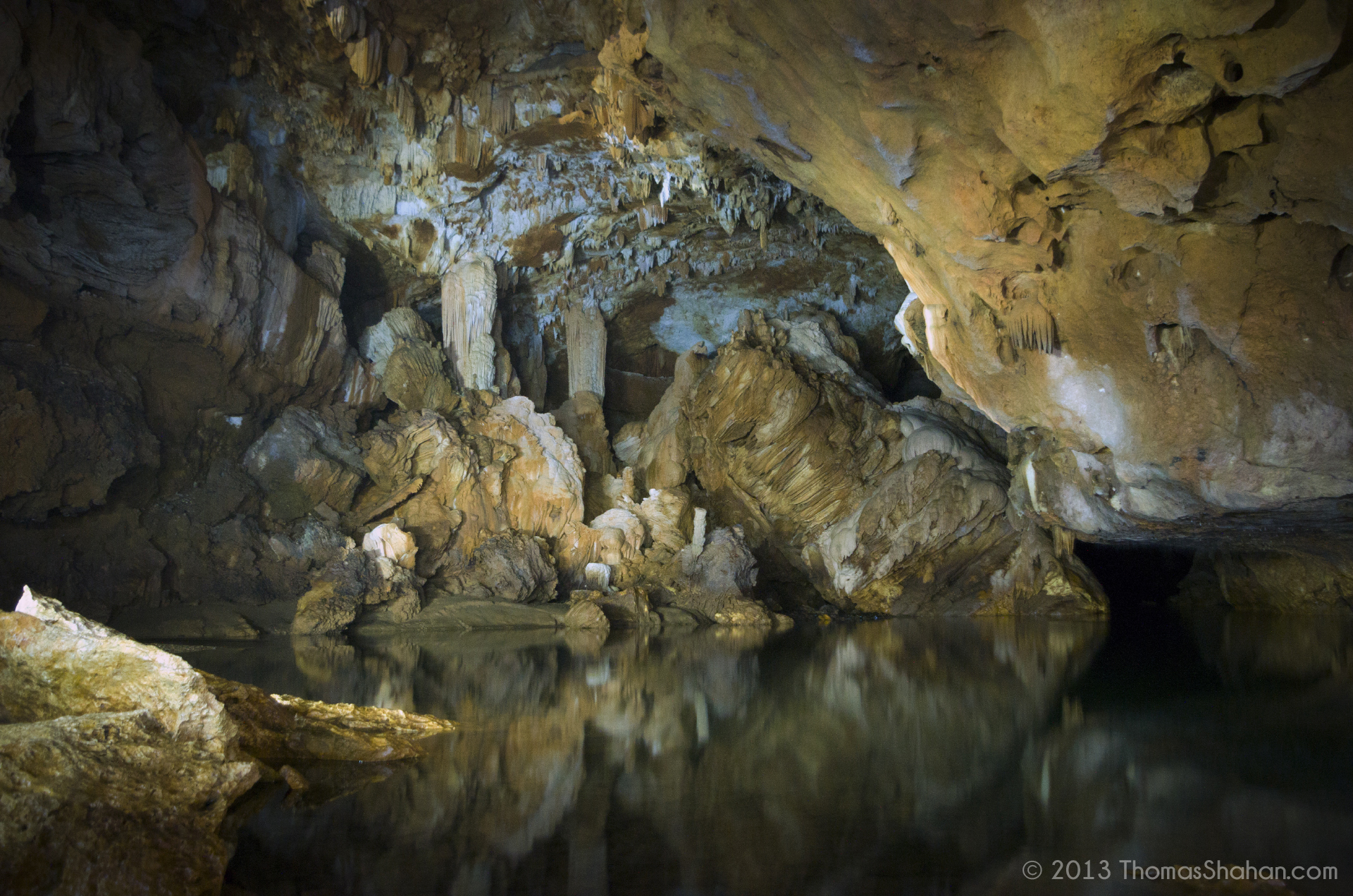
Rio Frio Cave

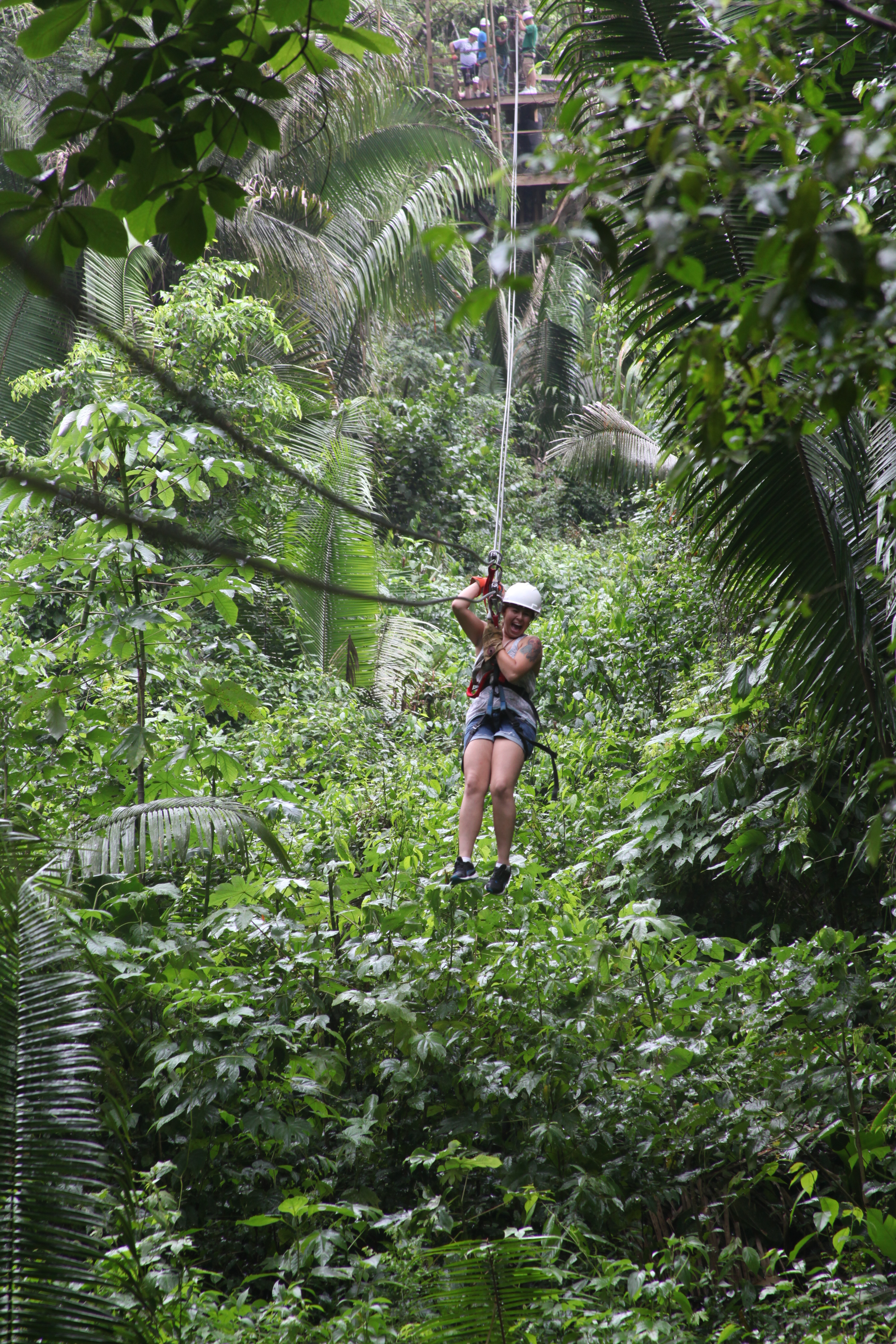
Zip-lining in the jungles of Belize

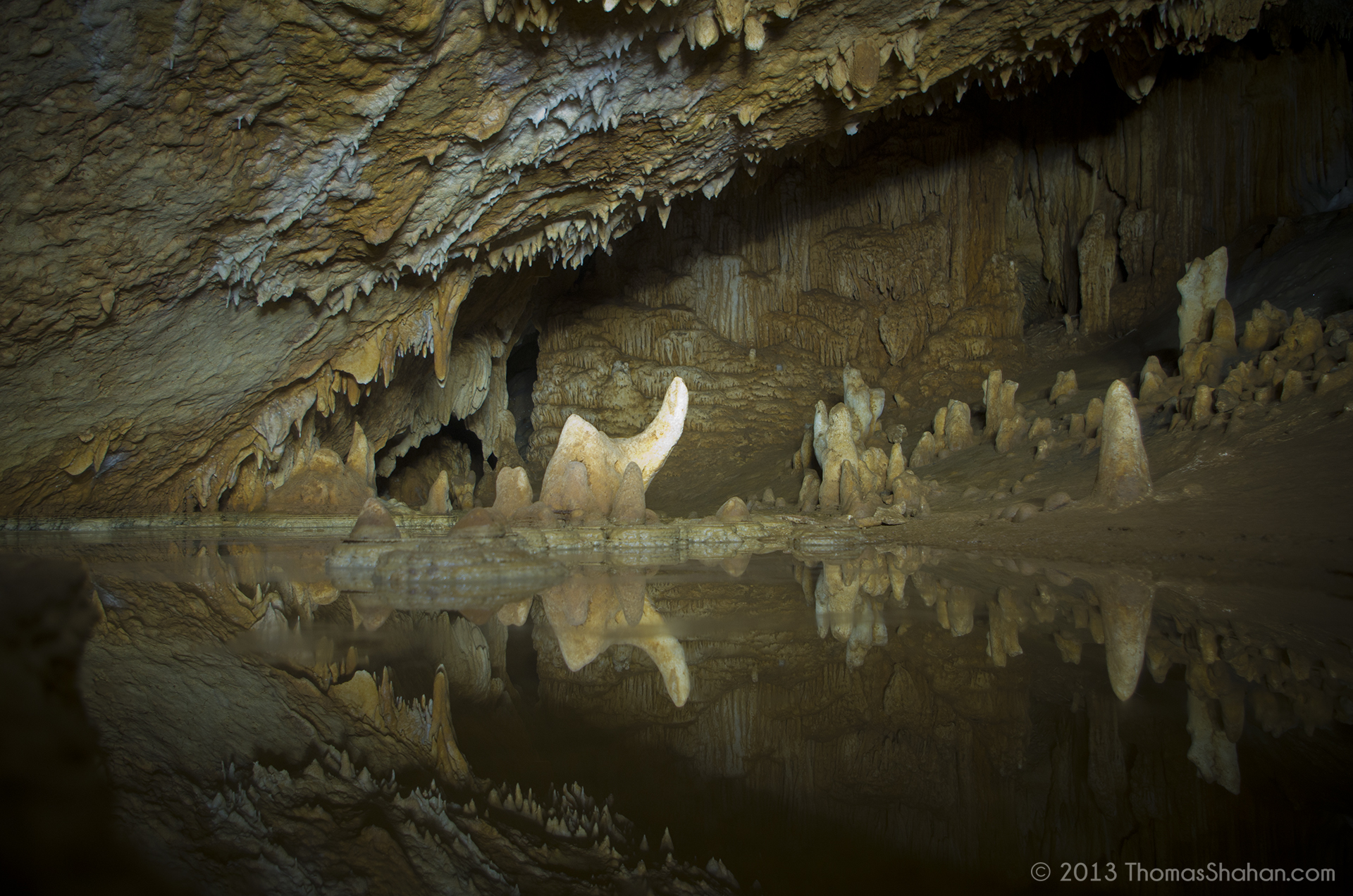
Barton Creek Cave

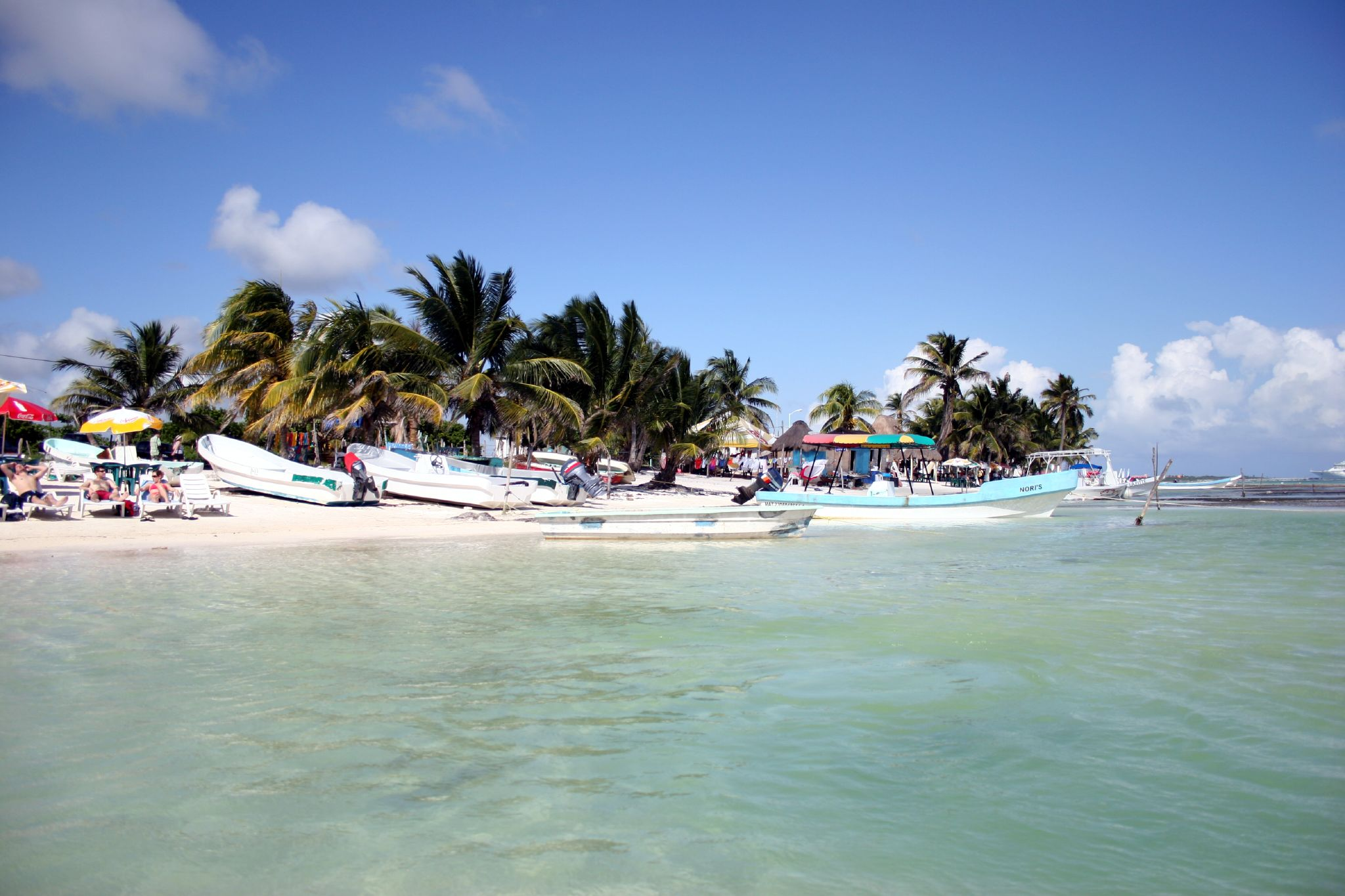
Sarteneja

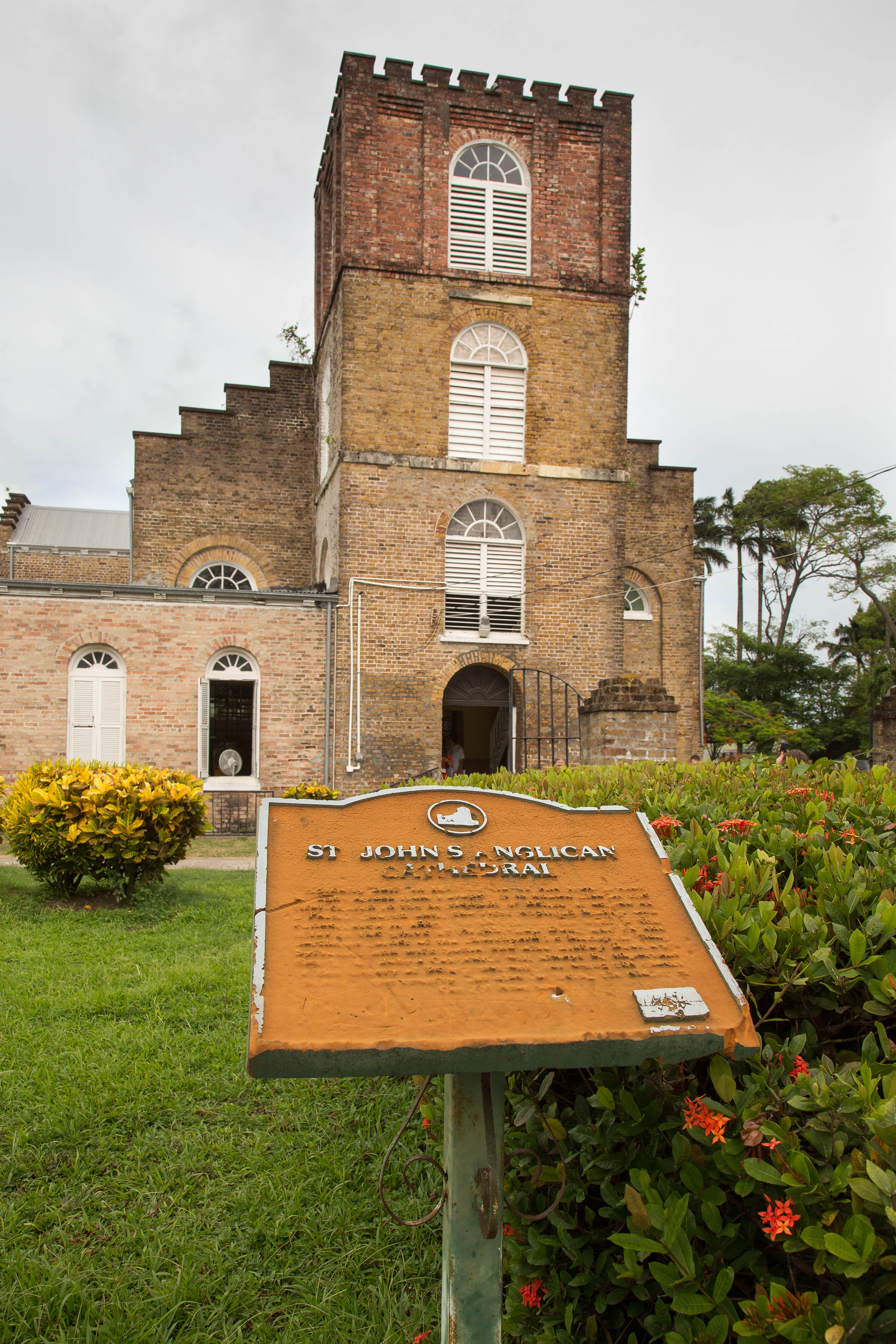
St. John's Cathedral

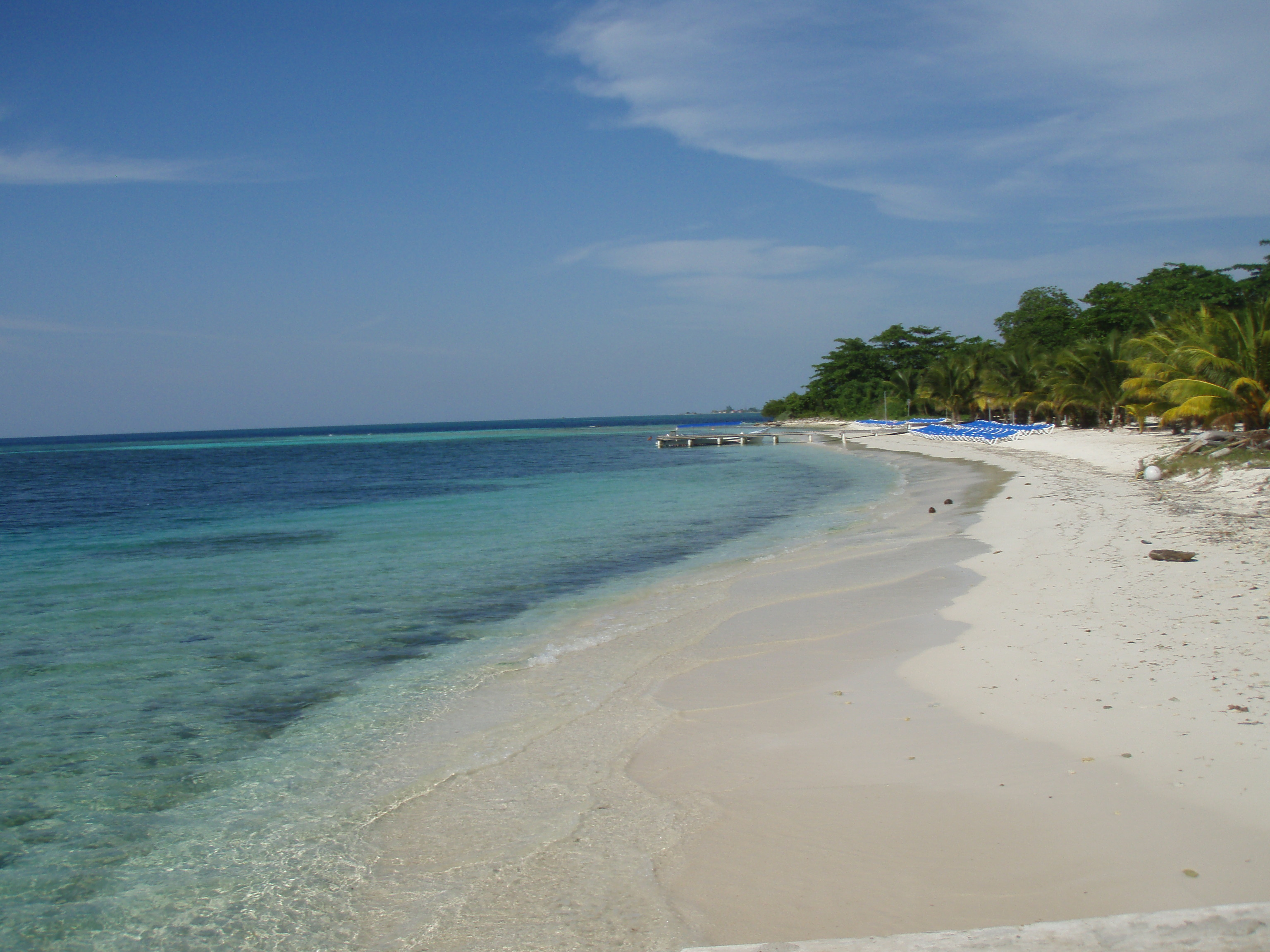
Sapodilla Cayes

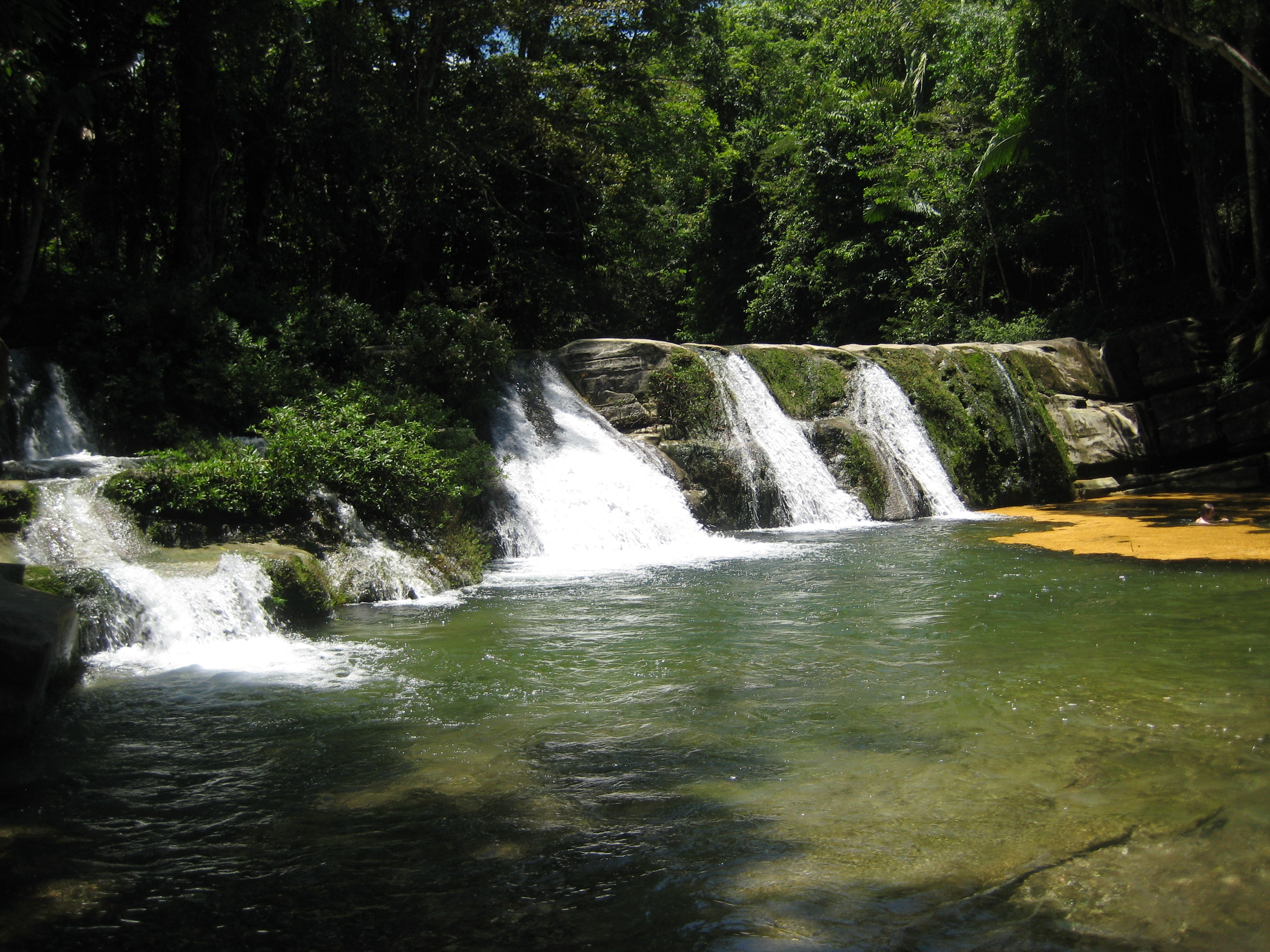
San Antonio Falls

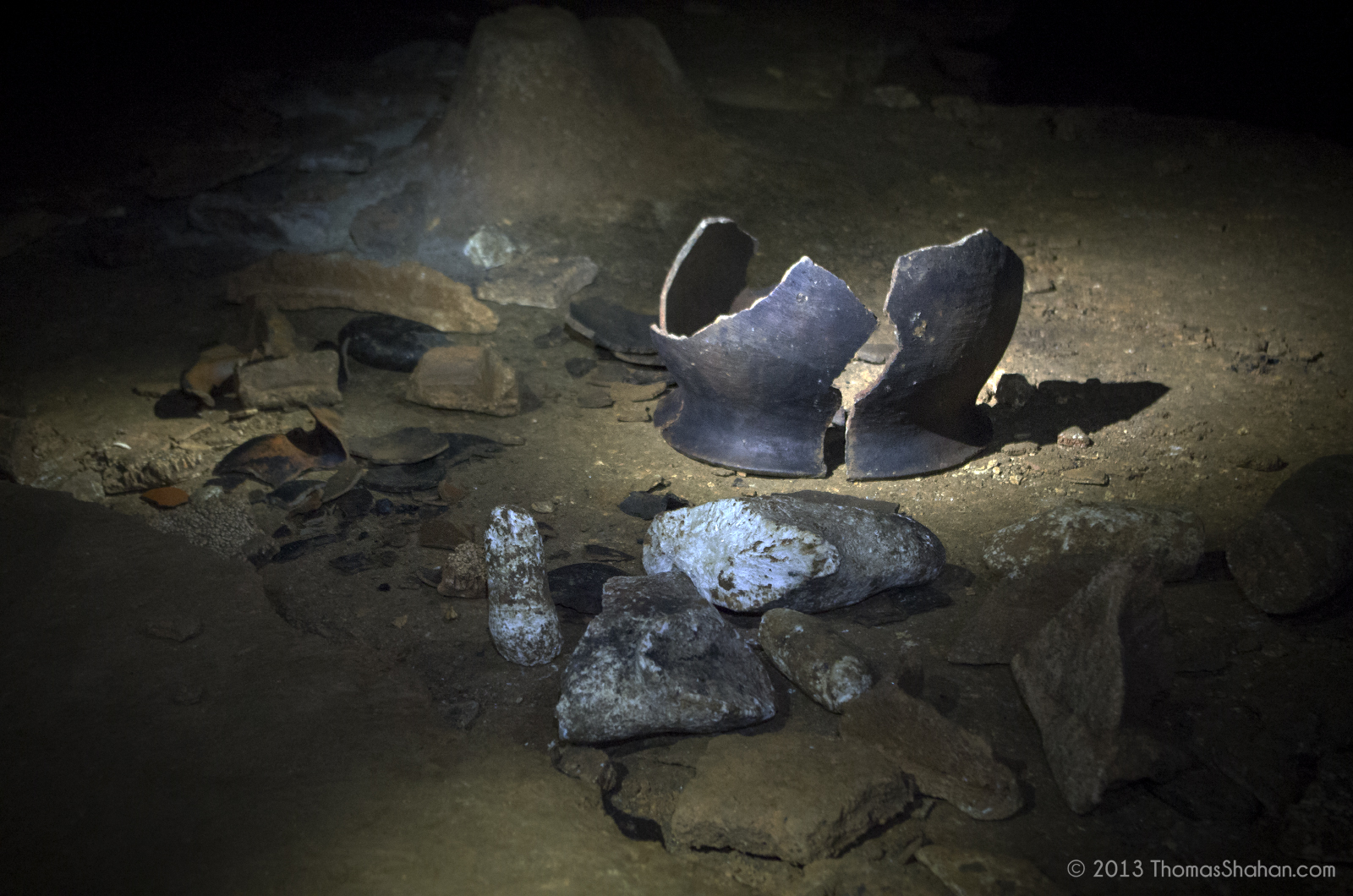
Che Chem Ha Cave

== Attractions by district ==
Belize District

- Altun Ha
- Great Blue Hole
- La Isla Bonita Ambergris Caye
- Belize Barrier Reef
- Hol Chan Marine Reserve
- Museum of Belize
- Fort Street Tourism Village
- The Bliss Institute for the Performing Arts
- Old Belize Museum and Cucumber Beach
- The Belize Zoo (Called, "The Best little zoo in the world")
- Caye Caulker
- Belikin beer brewery
- San Pedro Town
- Swing Bridge
- Bakabush Adventure Tours
- Crocland Eco-park
- Numerous Cayes (islands)
- Gales Point
- Bacab Eco Park

Stann Creek District

- Cockscomb Basin Wildlife Sanctuary and Jaguar Reserve
- Placencia
- Hopkins
- Victoria Peak
- Tobacco Caye
- Dangriga
- Numerous Cayes

Orange Walk District

- Lamanai
- San Estevan (Maya site)
- Rio Bravo Conservation and Management Area

Cayo District

- Actun Tunichil Muknal
- Caracol
- Xunantunich
- Cahal Pech
- El Pilar
- Blue Hole (park)
- Guanacaste National Park
- Chiquibul National Park
- Mountain Pine Ridge Forest Reserve
- Barton Creek Cave and Actun Tunichil Muknal (cave)
- 1,000 ft (300 m) Falls
- Chaa Creek
- Big Rock Falls
- Belize Botanic Gardens
- Victoria Peak, Belize's 2nd highest point at 1,120 m (3,675 ft)
- Doyle's Delight, Belize's highest point at 1,124 m (3,688 ft)
  - Chalilo Dam
- Maya Mountains

Toledo District

- Lubaantun
- Nim Li Punit
- Payne's Creek National Park
- Port Honduras Marine Reserve
- San Antonio, Santa Cruz and Rio Blanco Falls
- Maya Mountains
- Blue Creek
- Sapodilla Cayes
- Southwater Caye

Corozal District

- Bacalar Chico National Park
- Cerros
- The Corozal Free Zone
- Louisville, Belize
- Sarteneja

== See also ==
- Visa policy of Belize
- Economy of Belize
- List of airports in Belize
- Mesoamerican Barrier Reef System
