= Belizean Coast mangroves =

Ecoregion in the mangrove biome in Belize and Guatemala

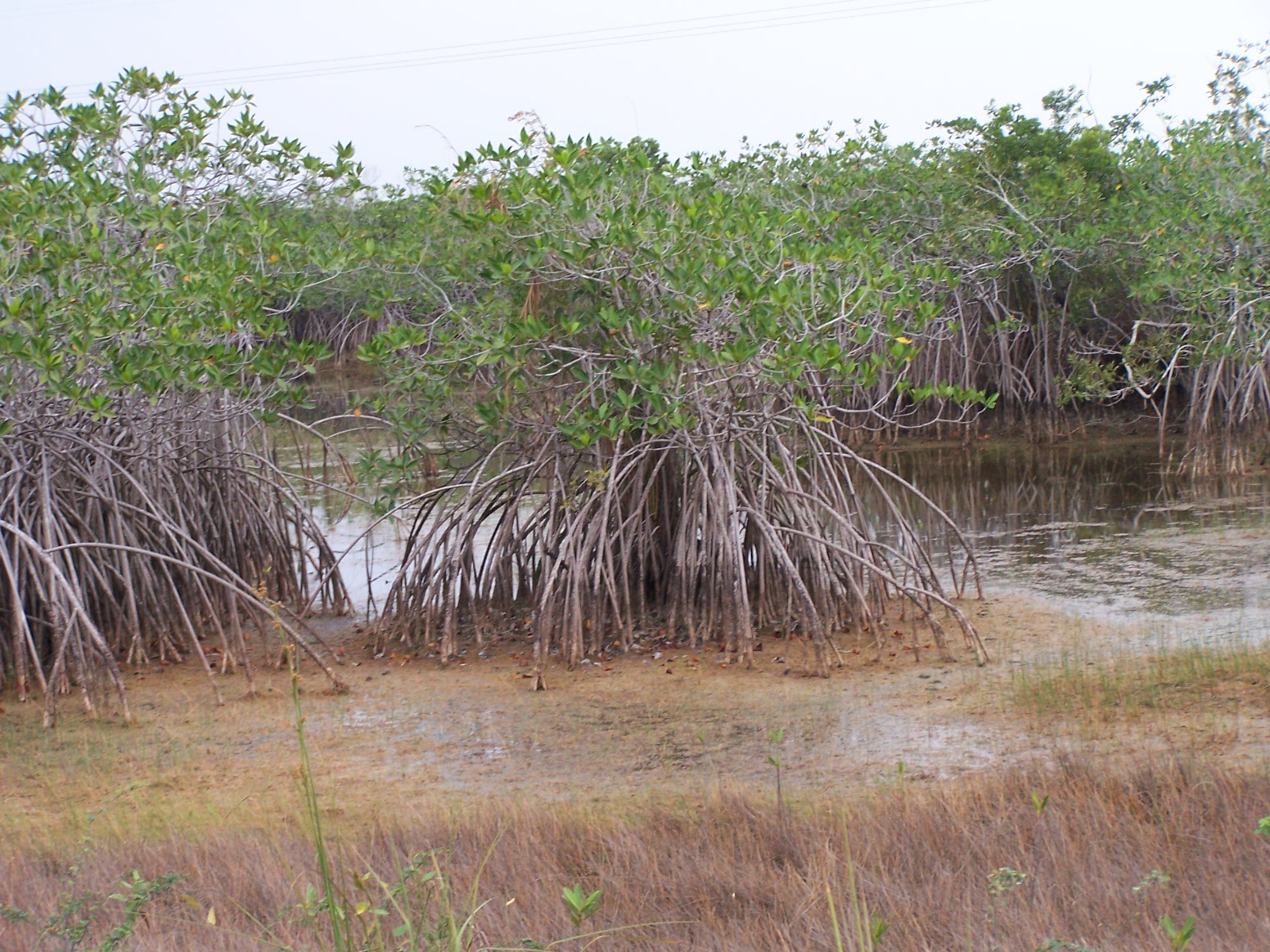
- Red mangrove in Belize

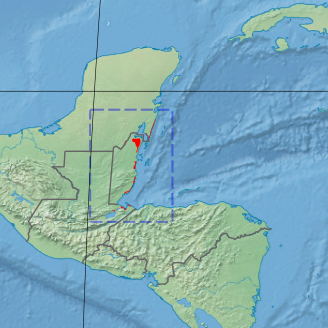
- Ecoregion territory

Ecology
- Biome: Mangroves
- Borders: Belizean pine forests; Central American Atlantic moist forests; Petén-Veracruz moist forests; Yucatán moist forests

Geography
- Area: 2,850 km^{2} (1,100 mi^{2})
- Countries: Belize; Guatemala; Mexico

Conservation
- Conservation status: Vulnerable

The Belizean Coast mangroves ecoregion covers the brackish and salt-water habitats along the Caribbean Sea coast of Belize, and of Amatique Bay in Guatemala; small parts in the border with Mexico are also present on this ecoregion. The mangroves are partially protected from the open sea by the Belize Barrier Reef, and this ecoregion is distinct from the reef-based Belizean Reef mangroves ecoregion offshore. There is a large population of the vulnerable West Indian manatee (Trichechus manatus) in the area. It covers an area of around 2,850 km^{2} (1,100 sq mi).

== Location and description ==
The disconnected units of the ecoregion extend from the Mexico–Belize border in the north, to Amatique Bay on the southern coast of Guatemala. There are different types of mangrove swamps, depending on the site characteristics: river estuary (such as the Monkey River), lagoons, island atolls, and coastal forest. Technically, Belize City itself is in a mangrove area.

Offshore islands supporting mangroves include Ambergris Caye, the largest island of Belize, and the atoll reefs of Banco Chinchorro and Turneffe Atoll.

== Climate ==
The climate of the ecoregion is Tropical savanna climate - dry winter (Köppen climate classification (Aw)). This climate is characterized by relatively even temperatures throughout the year, and a pronounced dry season. The driest month has less than 60 mm (2.4 in) of precipitation, and is drier than the average month.

== Flora and fauna ==
The common mangrove tree species of the ecoregion are red mangrove (Rhizophora mangle)(generally closest to and in the water), black mangrove (Avicennia germinans) and white mangrove (Laguncularia racemosa) (farther inland or upland). Also characteristic of the area is the false mangrove or the mangrove associate, the buttonwood tree (Conocarpus erectus).

Mammals of conservation interest include the near-threatened black howler monkey (Alouatta caraya), the critically endangered Hickatee turtle (Dermatemys mawii ), the tapir (Tapirus bairdii), the vulnerable West Indian manatee (Trichechus manatus), and Morelet's crocodile (Crocodylus moreletii).

== Protected areas ==
Protected areas of the ecoregion include:

- Shipstern Conservation & Management Area, in Corozal District of Belize
- Bacalar Chico National Park and Marine Reserve, on the northern part of Ambergris Island, in Belize District of Belize
- Payne's Creek National Park, in the Toledo District of southern Belize
- Sarstoon-Temash National Park, in the Toledo District of southern Belize
