= Belizean reef mangroves =

Ecological region of central America

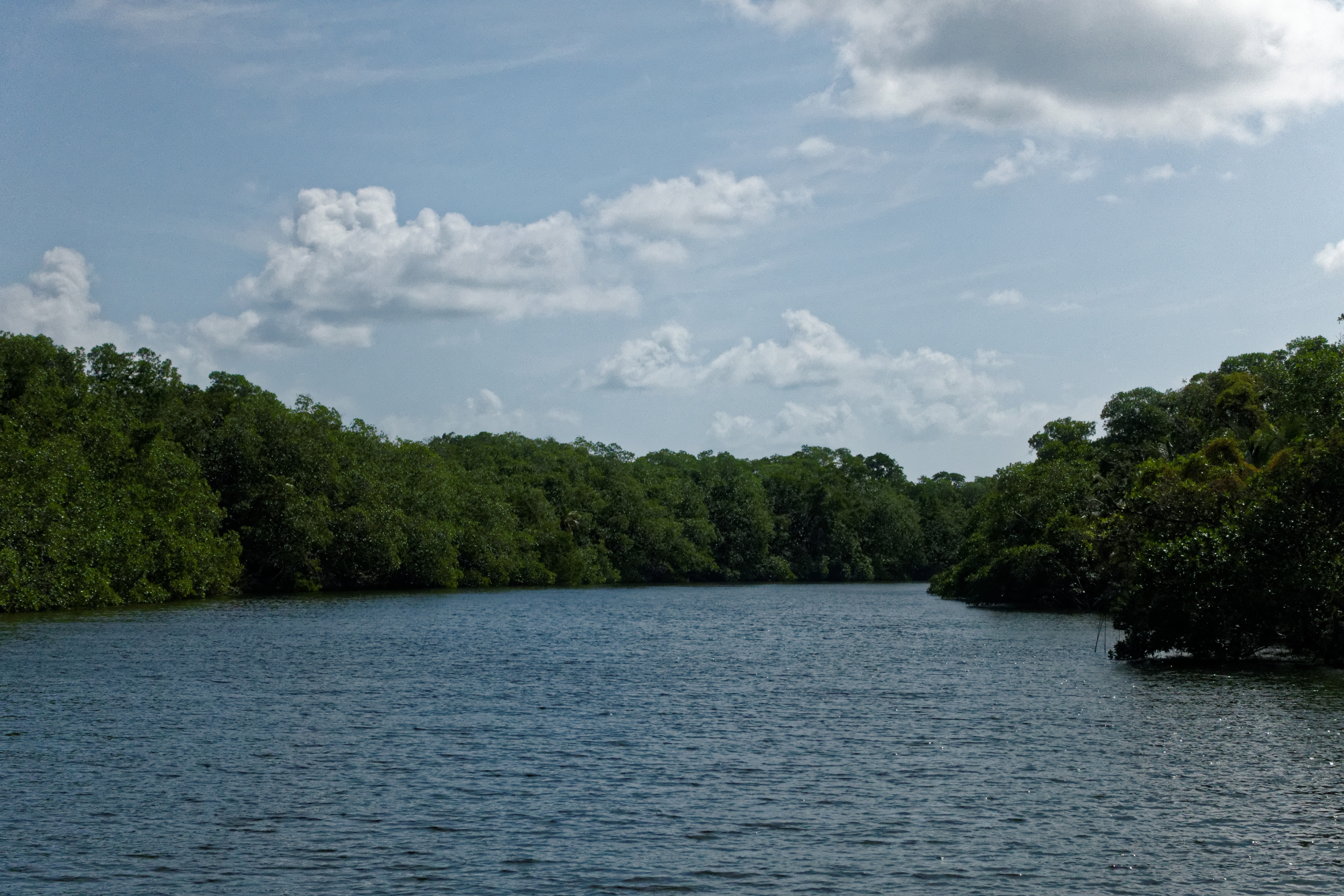
- On Glover's Reef, Belize

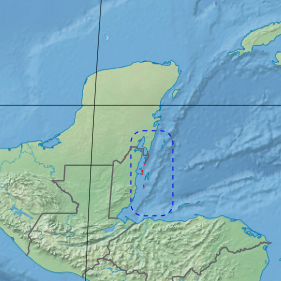
- Ecoregion territory (red areas in blue-dashed box)

Ecology
- Realm: Neotropic realm
- Biome: Mangroves

Geography
- Area: 259 km^{2} (100 mi^{2})
- Country: Belize
- Coordinates: 17.6°N 88°W

The Belizean reef mangroves ecoregion (WWF ID: NT1406) covers the mangrove habitats along the islands and cayes of the Belize Barrier Reef. This ecoregion is distinct from the mainland Belizean Coast mangroves ecoregion, and may be considered a sub-unit of the overall Mesoamerican Gulf-Caribbean mangroves ecoregion.

== Location and description ==
The mangrove habitats of this ecoregion are associated with the islands along the 220 km Belize barrier reef, stretching from the Mexico border south; the ecoregion also extends across three coral atolls (Turneffe Atoll, Lighthouse Reef and Glover's Reef), sea grass beds and some coastal lagoons.

== Climate ==
The climate of the ecoregion is Tropical savanna climate - dry winter (Köppen climate classification (Aw)). This climate is characterized by relatively even temperatures throughout the year, and a pronounced dry season. The driest month has less than 60 mm (2.4 in) of precipitation, and is drier than the average month.

== Flora and fauna ==
The most common mangrove tree species in this ecoregion is the red mangrove (Rhizophora mangle), with some white mangrove (Laguncularia racemosa, black mangrove (Avicennia germinans), and coconut palms (Cocos nucifera).

Mammals of conservation interest include the vulnerable West Indian manatee (Trichechus manatus), the endangered green sea turtle (Chelonia mydas), the critically endangered hawksbill sea turtle (Eretmochelys imbricata), the vulnerable loggerhead sea turtle (Caretta caretta), and the vulnerable American crocodile (Crocodylus acutus). The ecoregion supports significant bird colonies, including the red-footed booby (Sula sula), brown booby (Sula leucogaster), and the brown ('common') noddy (Anous stolidus).

== Protected areas ==
About 12% of the land area of the Belizean Barrier Reefs are officially protect, a portion of which is mangrove habitat. Protected areas in this ecoregion include:

- Bacalar Chico National Park and Marine Reserve
- Great Blue Hole National Monument
- Half Moon Caye National Monument
