= Golden Stream Corridor Preserve =

Protected area in Belize

- IUCN category IV (habitat/species management area)
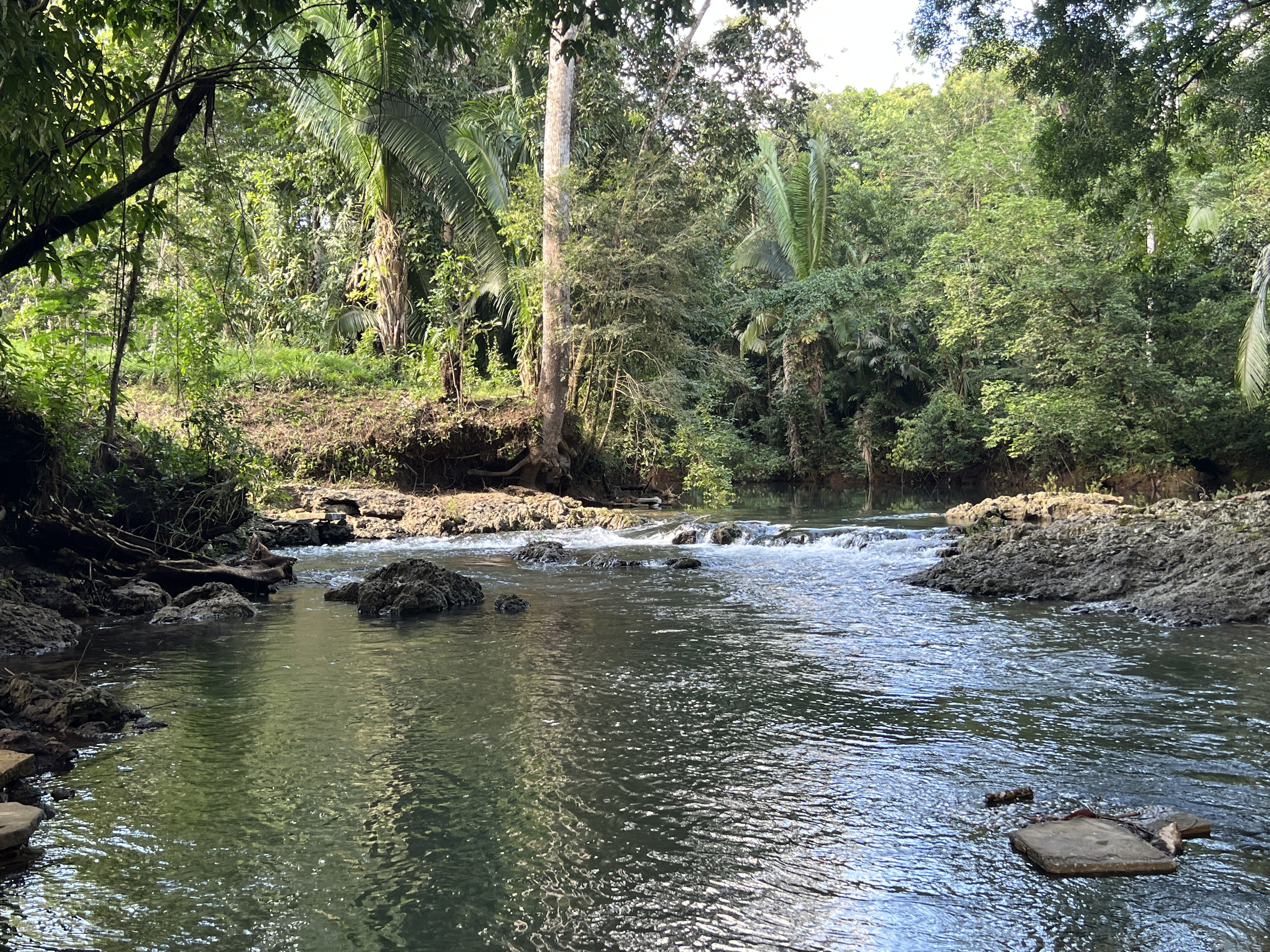
- Golden Stream
- Interactive map of Golden Stream Corridor Preserve
- Location: Toledo District, Belize
- Coordinates: 16.4218°N 88.7486°W
- Governing body: Ya'axche' Conservation Trust

The Golden Stream Corridor Preserve is a nature preserve in Belize with a unique diversity of habitat types and ecosystems. The preserve is owned and managed by Ya'axche' Conservation Trust. The preserve protects the Golden Stream watershed.

== Location ==
The Golden Stream Corridor preserve is located in the southern part of Belize and is estimated to be approximately 15,000 acres (61 km^{2}). The nature reserve is located near the Nim Li Punit archaeological site.

== Ecosystem ==
The nature preserve is made up of many different ecosystems which includes both forest and marine ecosystems. Its forest ecosystem includes a pristine forest consisting of many mahogany and Santa Maria trees and a riverine forest. The marine ecosystem includes an estuarine environment which is home to many marine organisms. The area is also important because of the watershed it contains, which runs southeast from the southern highway and pours into the Port of Honduras Marine Reserve. These diverse ecosystems are primarily the reason that the nature preserve is considered to be a biological corridor with a large variety of animals.

=== Flora and fauna ===
The Golden Stream Corridor Preserve is a forest and marine environment that contains diverse flora and fauna.

Plants within the preserve include the mahogany, giant fig, ceiba, Santa Maria, and many other trees and flowering plants.

The ecosystems attract and provides home for many organisms. The preserve is home to 270 birds, 19 amphibian, 20 fish, 59 mammals and 57 reptiles. Some of the animals inhabiting the preserve are the jaguar, puma, ocelot, paca, kinkajou, margay and iguana. Many threatened and endangered wildlife also inhabits this area. An example of a threatened species is the Baird's tapir. Examples of endangered species are the Central American spider monkey, keel-billed toucan and the West Indian manatee.
