= Monkey River Town =

Village in the north of the Toledo District of Belize

Monkey River
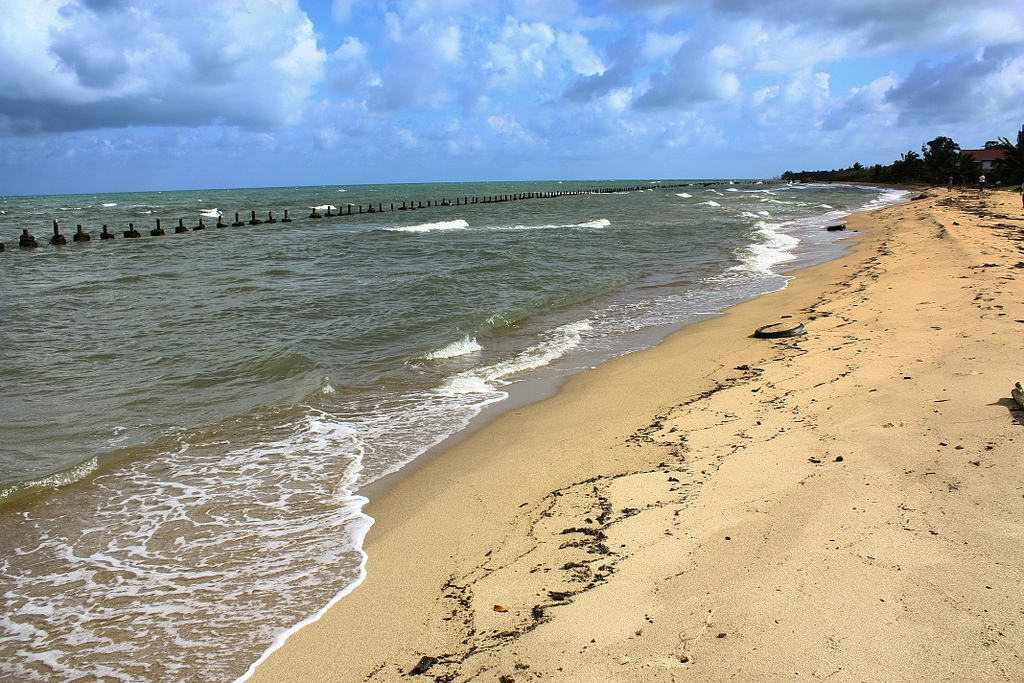

- Location within Belize
- Coordinates: 16°21′48″N 88°29′7″W
- Country: Belize
- District: Toledo
- Constituency: Toledo East

Population (2000)
  - Total: 200
- Time zone: UTC-6 (Central)
- Climate: Af

Monkey River (or Monkey River Town) is a village in the north of the Toledo District of Belize. It is on the Caribbean Sea on the southern shore of the mouth of Belize's Monkey River. In 2011 the estimated population was 200 people.

The village is one of the last purely Creole settlements in Belize, and many traditional practises are still carried out, such as cooking over the "fyah haat" (fire hearth). A road was built in the late 80's from the Southern Highway through orange groves and jungle to the village car park, and links the village to the outside world, although much travel is still by sea. The main occupations are fishing and ecotourism. There are two small hotels and a nearby fishing resort which can be reached by a five-minute sea trip. Guides can be easily found at Monkey River village to take visitors up the river to see the howler monkeys and other wildlife in Belize.

== Demographics ==
At the time of the 2010 census, Monkey River had a population of 196. Of these, 81.6% were Creole, 14.3% Mixed, 1.5% East Indian, 1.5% Mestizo and 0.5% Ketchi Maya.

== History ==
The village was incorporated as a town in 1891 at which time it had a population of some 2500 people, mostly engaged in the lumber and banana industry. With the decline of these industries and a blight of banana trees in this area, in the second half of the 20th century, the population declined, and in 1981 was legally reclassified as a village again, although retaining the historic name of "Town".

On October 9, 2001, Hurricane Iris made landfall at Monkey River Town as a 145 mph Category Four storm. The storm demolished most of the homes in the village, and destroyed the banana crop. The area's formerly large population of black howler monkeys was similarly greatly reduced, but has come back strongly and several troupes are to be seen along the river, a popular eco-tourist attraction. Researchers from the University of Calgary led by Dr. Mary Pavelka study the monkey population year-round.

Erosion of the southern foreshore (the intertidal zone), where the village is located, has been an important issue over recent years; this has been halted by a recent government project which installed a botan sea defence (a seawall). Further work will be carried out as finances permit. The northern foreshore is relatively unaffected.
