= Monkey River =

River in Belize

Coordinates: 16°21′N 88°29′W

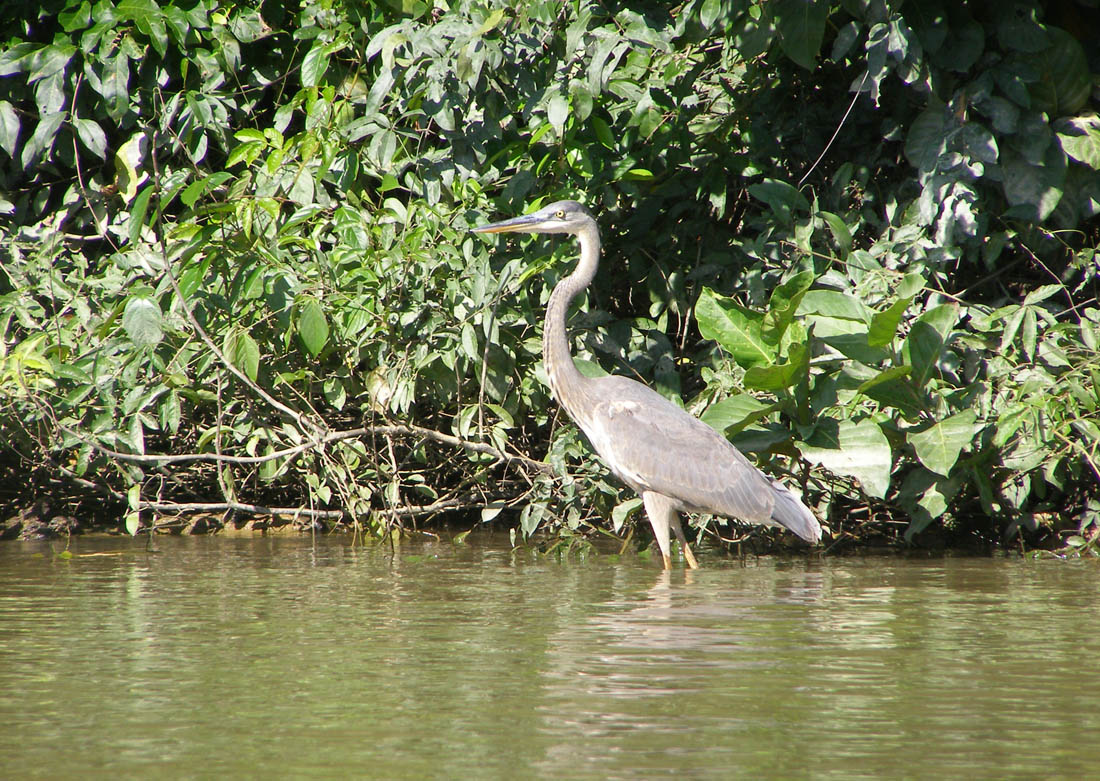
Monkey River lower reach showing a great blue heron wading

Monkey River is a coastal watercourse in southern Belize that rises in the Maya Mountains and discharges to the Caribbean Sea near Monkey River Town. One of Belize's major rivers, Monkey River has northern headwaters which originate in the Cockscomb Basin Wildlife Sanctuary, where the Swasey Branch drains the East Basin of that wildlife sanctuary. Further south, the Bladen Branch watercourse drains the eastern slopes of the Maya Mountains including the ancient Mayan settlement areas of Lubaantun and Nim Li Punit. These two watercourses join to form the Monkey River approximately 16 kilometres upstream from the mouth of the Monkey River. The Monkey River is readily navigated throughout the year using small boats, but navigation above the major confluence (of Bladen and Swasey Branches) becomes more difficult due to lack of depth when the dry season starts about February. Habitats in this watershed provide cover for such diverse species as the ocelot, jaguar, Guatemalan black howler, bare-throated tiger heron, Morelet's crocodile, fer-de-lance and manatee.

== Hydrology ==
The Monkey River is one of six large watersheds in the 4,000-square-kilometre (1,500 sq mi) Maya Mountain Marine Area Transect, which connects the Maya Mountains to the coastal waters of the Gulf of Honduras. According to The Nature Conservancy: "The Monkey River in southern Belize supports one of the most pristine coral reefs in Central America, which is part of the second largest barrier-reef system in the world." Thus the water quality of the Monkey River supports not only freshwater species in the river's upper reaches and estuarine species in the lower reaches, but also the sensitive offshore Belize Barrier Reef.

The Monkey River drains much of southern Belize through the Bladen (southern) Branch, which includes tributaries from a part of southern Guatemala and the southern slopes of the Maya Mountains in Belize, containing the ancient Mayan sites of Nim Li Punit and Lubaantun. The (northern) Swasey Branch of the Monkey River rises in the East Basin of the Cockscomb Basin Wildlife Sanctuary, a wilderness area set aside for jaguar preservation. During the rainy season, the Monkey River manifests considerable turbidity.

== Ecology ==
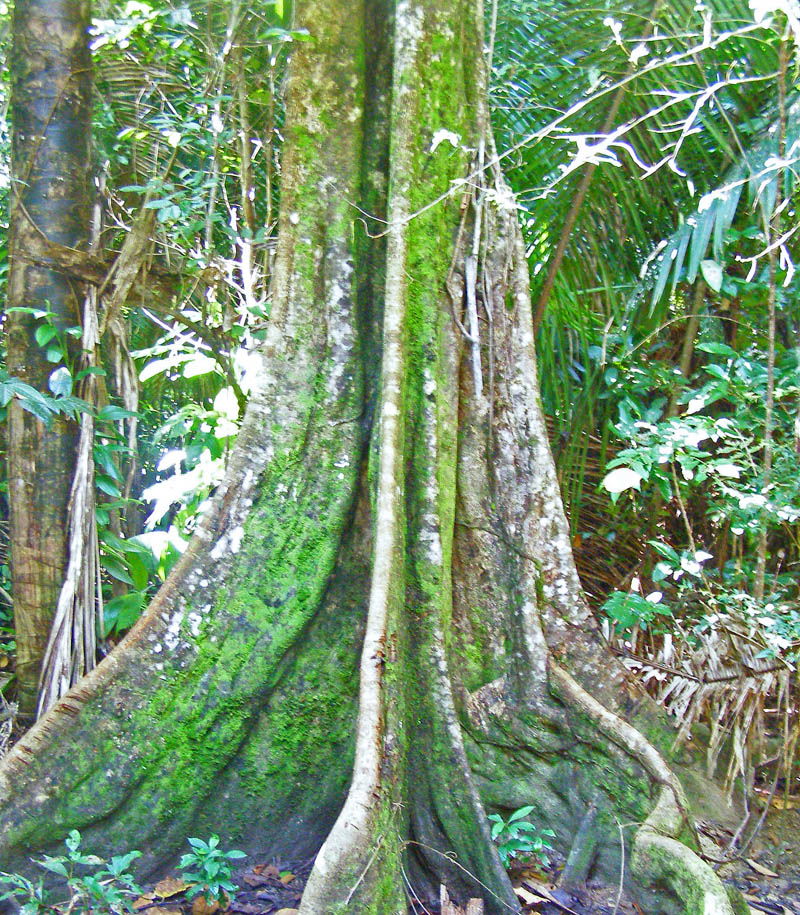
Yellow bay cedar in Payne's Creek National Park, Belize

The Monkey River has several important ecosystems including: (a) montane broadleaf primary forest; (b) upland coastal plain broadleaf secondary forest; (c) upper river freshwater riverine habitat; (d) lower reach estuarine and mangrove habitats; and (e) Caribbean Sea coral reef and turtle-grass marine habitat. This shallow marine environment is home to the endangered manatee. Each of these five discrete ecosystems contains important habitat for either terrestrial or aquatic species of southern Belize.

The highest upland watershed area contains expansive forests, which are primary in the highest elevations and secondary in the lower foothills of the Maya Mountains. These montane areas provided an impenetrable protective backdrop for the ancient Mayan settlements here, preventing invasion from any tribes resident in Honduras or Guatemala. These forests have important lumber species such as mahogany and cedar trees and a broad panoply of other broadleaf tree species as well as numerous lianas. Fauna include the jaguar, margay, tapir and venomous pit viper Fer-de-lance, Bothrops asper.

Along the middle and lower reaches, the forest is secondary, betraying the heritage of banana farms and slash-and-burn practises used historically in this area. Today much of this area is protected as the Payne's Creek National Park. Here, relatively dense jungle canopy has returned, resulting in a closed canopy of approximately 15 to 20 metres in height. Yellow bay cedar and other significant sized broadleaf species abound, along with numerous tropical vines and thorny undergrowth flora. A machete is essential for exploration even where there is an established trail. Black howler monkey troops are plentiful, each troop maintaining a home range of 40,000 to 70,000 square metres in this forest.

== Ecotourism ==
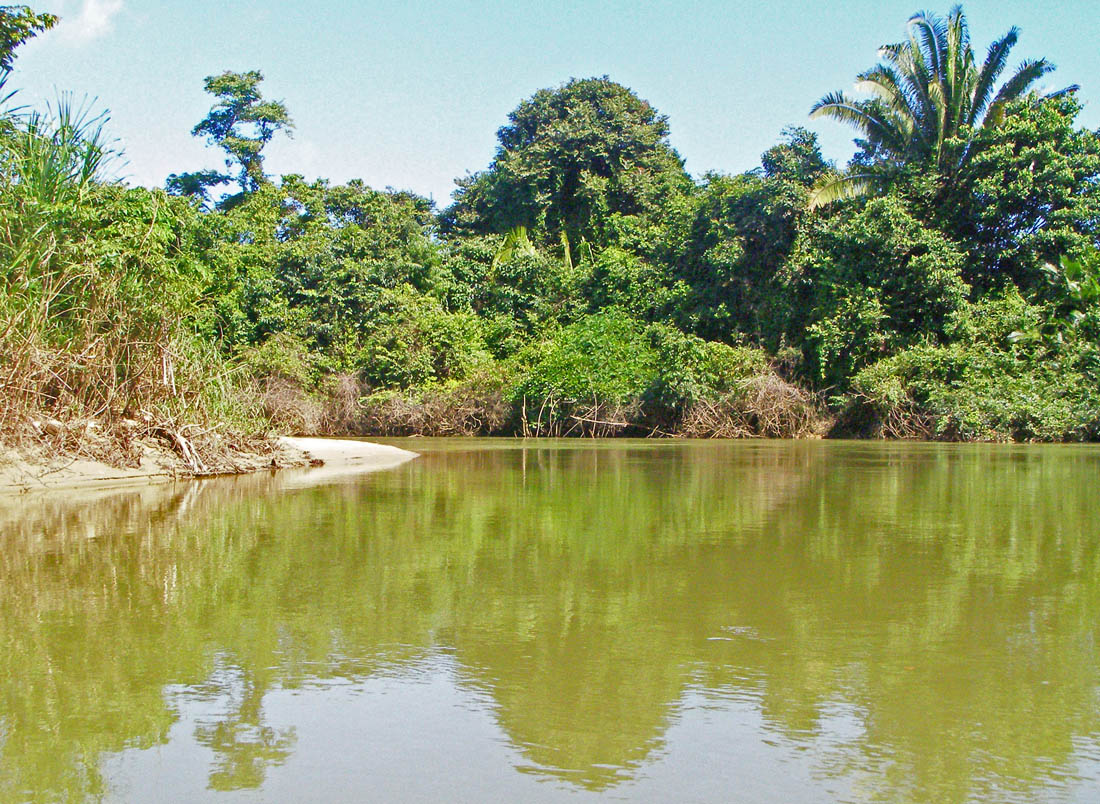
Estuarine lower reach of Monkey River, Belize

Boat trips up the Monkey River are a significant part of ecotourism for southern Belize. Most trips originate from Placencia or Roberts Grove, both marinas on the southern part of the Placencia Peninsula, located approximately 35 kilometres northeast of the mouth of the Monkey River. These small motorised boats typically stop at Monkey River Town for lunch and an exposure to the roadless native populace at that village. Most often the boat trips land at a location about ten kilometers upriver from the mouth to allow visitors a walk through the secondary growth forest.
