= Thousand Foot Falls =

Waterfall and natural monument in Belize

Coordinates: 17.0570°N 88.8482°W

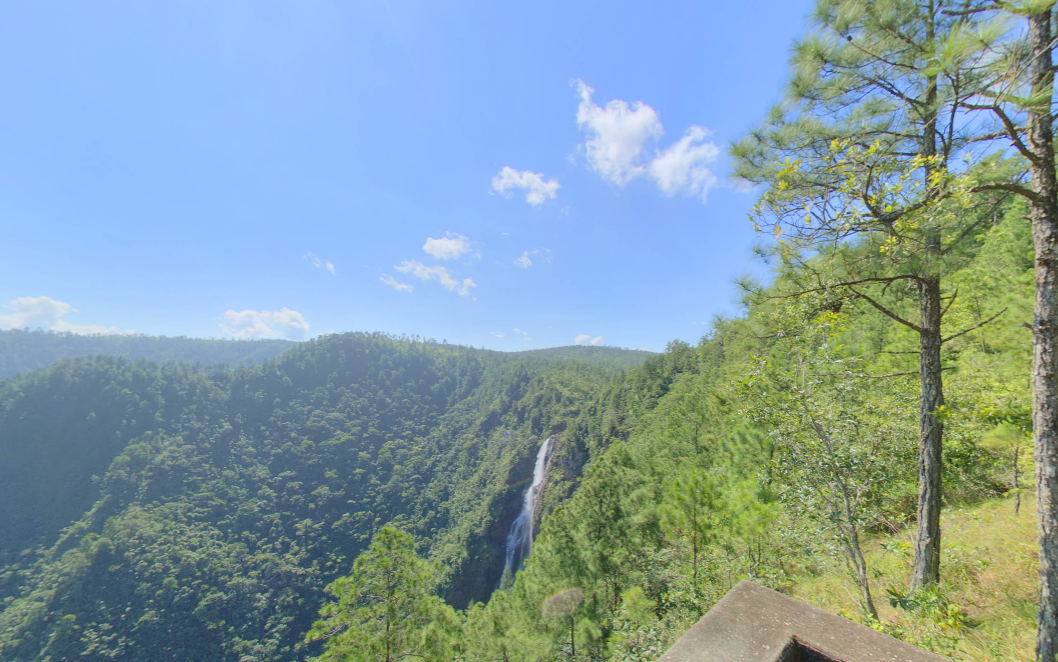

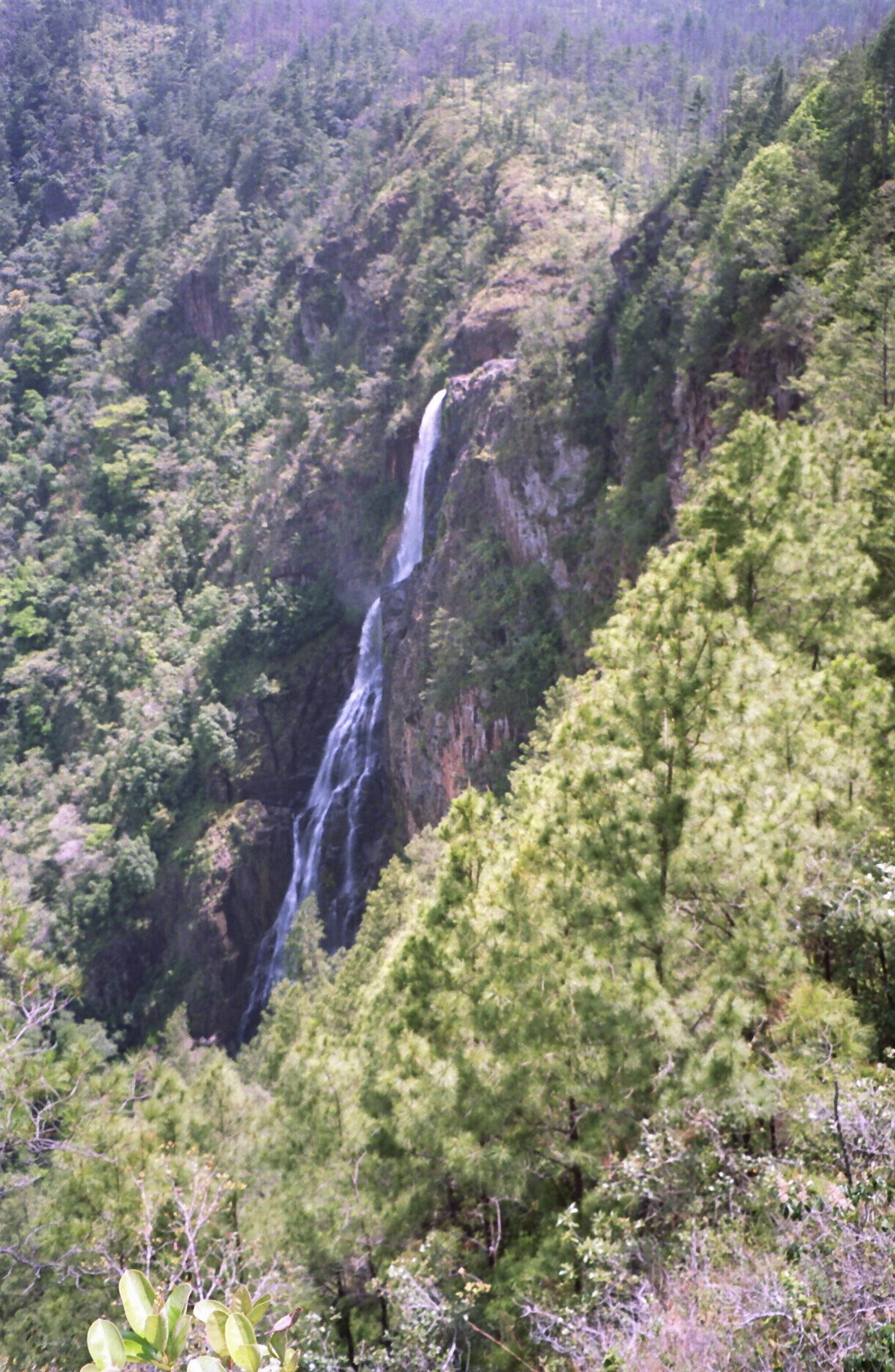
Thousand Foot Falls

Thousand Foot Falls, also known as Hidden Valley Falls, is a waterfall and the centerpiece of a Belizean natural monument in Cayo District, Belize. Thousand Foot Falls is a misnomer; it is actually 1,600 feet (490 m) tall or taller and is believed to be the tallest waterfall in Central America.

Situated in the Maya Mountains, the falls drop over a sharp granite escarpment into a pool and become the headwater of Roaring Creek, which flows into a nearby cave to the north.

Thousand Foot Falls National Monument was established in 2004 to protect the ecological system. It is part of one of the largest tropical rainforests in Central America, and is home to a number of endangered species, including the scarlet macaw, jaguar, Baird's tapir and orange-breasted falcon. With an area of 1,290 acres (520 ha), it is one of the country's smallest protected areas. Belize Karst Habitat Conservation, a registered non-governmental organization, manages it in conjunction with the government.

Ecotourism bolsters the local economy. There is an outlook about 0.5 miles (0.80 km) from the falls; a viewer can see about the top third of the falls from that vantage point. A closer look from the pool at the bottom of the falls requires several challenging hours of hiking through thickly forested, mountainous terrain. Climbing to the top is strongly discouraged as it is dangerous. Birdwatching is a popular activity. According to eBird, 252 species have been spotted there.

== See also ==
- List of waterfalls
