= Payne's Creek National Park =

National park in Belize

- IUCN category II (national park)
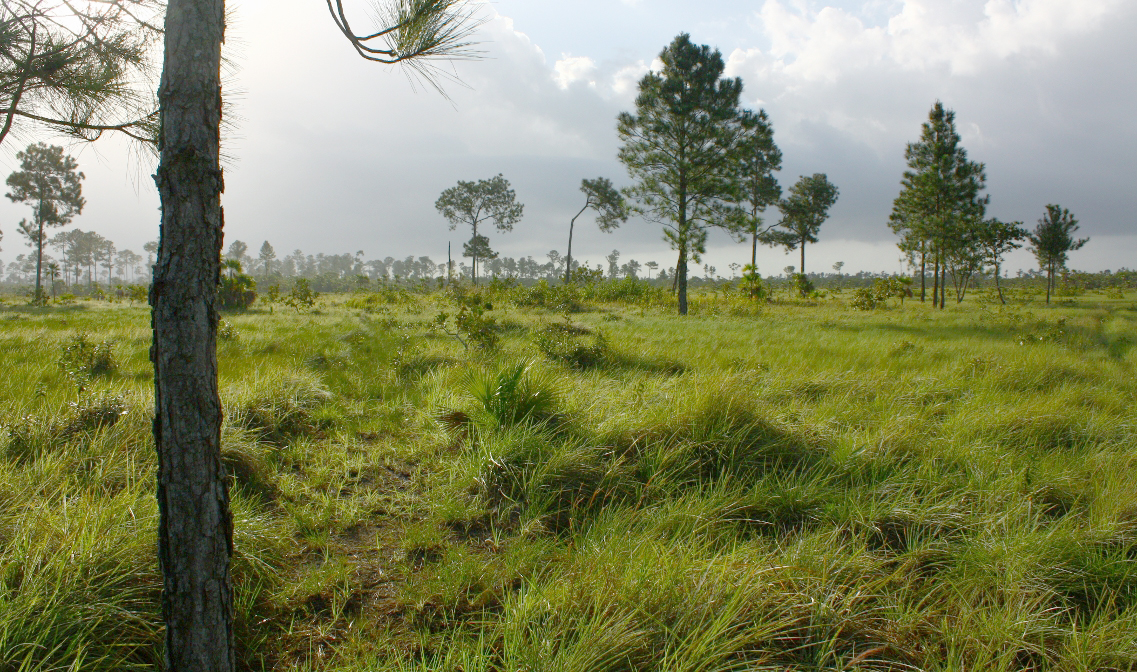
- Caribbean pine trees in the park

- Location within Belize
- Location: Toledo District, Belize
- Coordinates: 16°19′37″N 88°34′37″W
- Area: 37,680 acres (152 km^{2})
- Established: 1994
- Governing body: Toledo Institute for Development and Environment, Belize Forest Department

Payne's Creek National Park (PCNP) is a nature reserve in the Toledo District of southern Belize. The government of Belize created the park in 1994 in response to petitioning from community groups in the Monkey River and Punta Negra areas. It is co-managed by the Toledo Institute for Development and Environment and the Belize Forest Department.

== Geography ==
The national park lies a bit south of the Monkey River, with its southern boundary at Punta Ycacos Lagoon and its western side marked by the Deep River. While it initially contained Punta Ycacos Lagoon, in 2004 the lagoon, Punta Negra Lagoon and most of the park's coastal ridges were removed, while pine savanna from Deep River Forest Reserve to the north and northeast was added.

It comprises 37,680 acres (152 km^{2}) of land consisting of "hypersaline, saline, brackish and freshwater habitats, mangroves, broadleaf forest and savannah".

The following ecosystem types were identified in the park:

- Saline wetlands
- Coastal ridge
- Freshwater / low-salinity wetlands
- Broad-leafed forest
- Savana with / without pines
- Shrublands

== Fauna ==
It harbors felines such as the jaguar, ocelot, margay, and jaguarundi; white-lipped peccary; paca; Baird's tapir; white-tailed and red brocket deer; Hawksbill turtle; Morelet's crocodile; and boa constrictor. Under 300 species of birds, such as the jabiru stork, Muscovy duck, and aplomado falcon, either reside in or use the park as wintering grounds.

There are 20 endangered or vulnerable species in residence, including the West Indian manatee, Atlantic goliath grouper, yellow-headed parrot and Yucatán black howler monkey. Howler monkey troops are abundant here, each troop maintaining a home range of 40,000 to 70,000 square metres (430,000 to 750,000 sq ft) in this forest.

== Maya sites ==
At least four Maya archaelogical sites have been discovered in Payne's Creek National Park to date. One site is underwater, with rare wooden artifacts, including the first intact Maya paddle ever found, and portions of wooden buildings, preserved by anerobic peat.

The excavations of submerged Mayan saltworks here, dating back to 300–900 AD, highlight the usage of stone tools for cutting meat or fish, salting and preserving them for transporting to inland markets.
