= Port Honduras Marine Reserve =

Marine nature reserve in Toledo District, Belize

- IUCN category IV (habitat/species management area)
- Location within Belize
- Location: Gulf of Honduras, Belize
- Nearest city: Punta Gorda
- Coordinates: 16°12′11″N 88°38′02″W
- Area: 40,470 hectares (100,000 acres)
- Established: January 2000
- Governing body: Belize Fisheries Department; Toledo Institute for Development and Environment

Port Honduras Marine Reserve is a national protected marine reserve in the Toledo district of Belize. It was established in January 2000, and covers 40,470 hectares (100,000 acres) of mangrove and coastal ecosystems. It encompasses over one hundred small, mangrove-fringed cayes, benthic habitats comprising soft-bottom seagrass beds and fringing reefs.

The reserve is co-managemened by the community-based Non Governmental Organization the Toledo Institute for Development and Environment. It is divided into three zones: a general use zone, a preservation zone and a conservation zone.
