= Bacalar Chico National Park and Marine Reserve =

National park in Belize

- IUCN category IV (habitat/species management area)
- Location within Belize
- Location: Ambergris Caye, Belize District, Belize
- Coordinates: 18.141°N 87.863°W
- Area: 15,530 acres (62.8 km^{2})
- Established: 1996

Bacalar Chico National Park and Marine Reserve (BCNPMR) is a protected area and UNESCO World Heritage Site on the northern part of Ambergris Caye in Belize.

== History ==
BCNPMR had its inception in the early 1990s when the Broadhead Group sought to construct a community for retirees in northern Ambergris Caye. An environmental impact assessment by the Belize Center for Environmental Studies found the Bacalar Chico region to have an unusually high biodiversity for a barrier island. In 1995, the Natural Resources Management Plan and the Protection Project first developed a comprehensive management plan for the various vegetative assemblages within Belize. This plan specifically recommended the extreme northern portion of the island for inclusion based on the merits of its salt marsh ecosystem. At this time, fishermen in San Pedro and the mainland village of Sarteneja were growing concerned over the accelerating depletion of marine resources on Ambergris Caye.

Community support for the creation of a reserve in Bacalar Chico was largely influenced by the Hol Chan Marine Reserve's success in generating revenue from entrance fees and sustaining tour guiding operations. In 1995, the San Pedro NGO Greenreef Environmental Institute developed a management plan for the area, and a year later Bacalar Chico was officially recognized as a national park and marine reserve. The park remained protected in name only for the next three years. The Coastal Zone Management Authority and Institute (CZMAI) began paying salaries and operational expenses for marine protected areas designated under the World Heritage criteria in 1999. Funding from the CZMAI expired in 2004, when the financial and managerial responsibility for BCNPMR was transferred to the Government of Belize, which now furnishes US$100,000 a year for operational expenses and the salaries of the park's four rangers. An additional 10% of the park's budget is provided through small grants from organizations including the Nature Conservancy and the MesoAmerican Barrier Reef Systems Project.

== Governance ==
BCNPMR comprises two distinct legal areas with their own set of laws. The national park is managed under the National Park Systems Act, with the ministerial responsibility held by the Ministry of Natural Resources, Environment and Industry. This section encompasses 12,640 acres (51.2 km^{2}) of land, of which 20% are privately owned lands. The strip of privately held land within BCNPMR is administered through the Ministry of Housing. One parcel given to the location of the current ranger headquarters. The remainder of the private holdings in the park consists of several parcels that comprise the majority of the park's windward shoreline.

The marine reserve, which is 15,530 acres (62.8 km^{2}) of ocean and lagoon, is managed under the Ministry of Agriculture and Fisheries. As with most parks in Belize, Bacalar Chico National Park and Bacalar Chico Marine Reserve are co-managed by NGOs. A Memorandum of Understanding gives co-management responsibilities to Sarteneja Alliance for Conservation and Development (SACD) for the management of the national park, and Hol Chan for the co-management of the marine reserve. SACD is legally responsible for education efforts involving the park and Hol Chan for the marine reserve, and both are in part responsible for research and surveys carried out within the park and marine reserve respectively, for legal lobbying, and for the procurement of grants. An advisory committee consisting of representatives from the government, environmental organizations, local businesses, and fishing and guiding cooperatives periodically meets for review and consultation on decisions regarding BCNP and BCMR.

== Wildlife and habitat ==
The park exhibits a high degree of diversity of habitats, encompassing swamps, grasslands, and various tropical forest assemblages including a medium semi-deciduous forest and a rare littoral, or beach, forest, which elsewhere in Belize has diminished due to coastal development. BCNPMR's marine habitats include extensive tracts of mangrove and sea grass beds, patch and barrier reef, and the largest lagoon on the island of Ambergris caye, Laguna de Cantena. The reef lies within the Mesoamerican Barrier Reef System, the world's second longest barrier reef after the Great Barrier Reef in Australia. It stretches from the middle of the Yucatán Peninsula, down the entire coast of Belize, and terminates in Honduras. Rocky Point, within Bacalar Chico, is the only location in Belize where the barrier reef meets the shore. The point is 'rocky' because a fossilized Pleistocene reef lies exposed at the surface.

Within the park, all five species of cats native to Belize have been recorded, including the jaguar and puma. The forests are also home to a population of the endangered White-lipped Peccary. The mangroves and sea grass beds are home to manatees and crocodiles. Near Rocky Point lies the largest nesting beach for loggerhead and green sea turtles in Belize, and one of the largest for hawksbill turtles.

== Conservation ==
The corals are still recovering from the collapse of the keystone grazer of algae, the long-spined sea urchin, which occurred in the 1980s and 90s and resulted in widespread coral die-offs across the Caribbean. The corals themselves are subject to black and white band diseases, damage from hurricanes, and bleaching and reduced calcification brought on by increased sea surface temperatures and ocean acidification associated with global warming. The reefs of Belize were subjected to the catastrophic global bleaching event of 1998. Persisting high sea surface temperatures that year, coupled with the devastation of Hurricane Mitch, resulted in a 50% loss of living corals in some locations along the barrier reef. As of January 1999, less than 1% of elkhorn, staghorn, and lettuce corals remained alive within the Basil Jones area (within Bacalar Chico), while 90% of boulder star coral was afflicted with black-band disease immediately after the bleaching event. In fact, the threat posed by climate change was one of the primary reasons the UNESCO World Heritage committee awarded its designation to the seven marine protected areas in Belize. In addition, BCNPMR is among the five marine protected areas in Belize that can be classified as overfished.
