= Bladen Nature Reserve =

Nature reserve in Toledo, Belize

- IUCN category Ia (strict nature reserve)
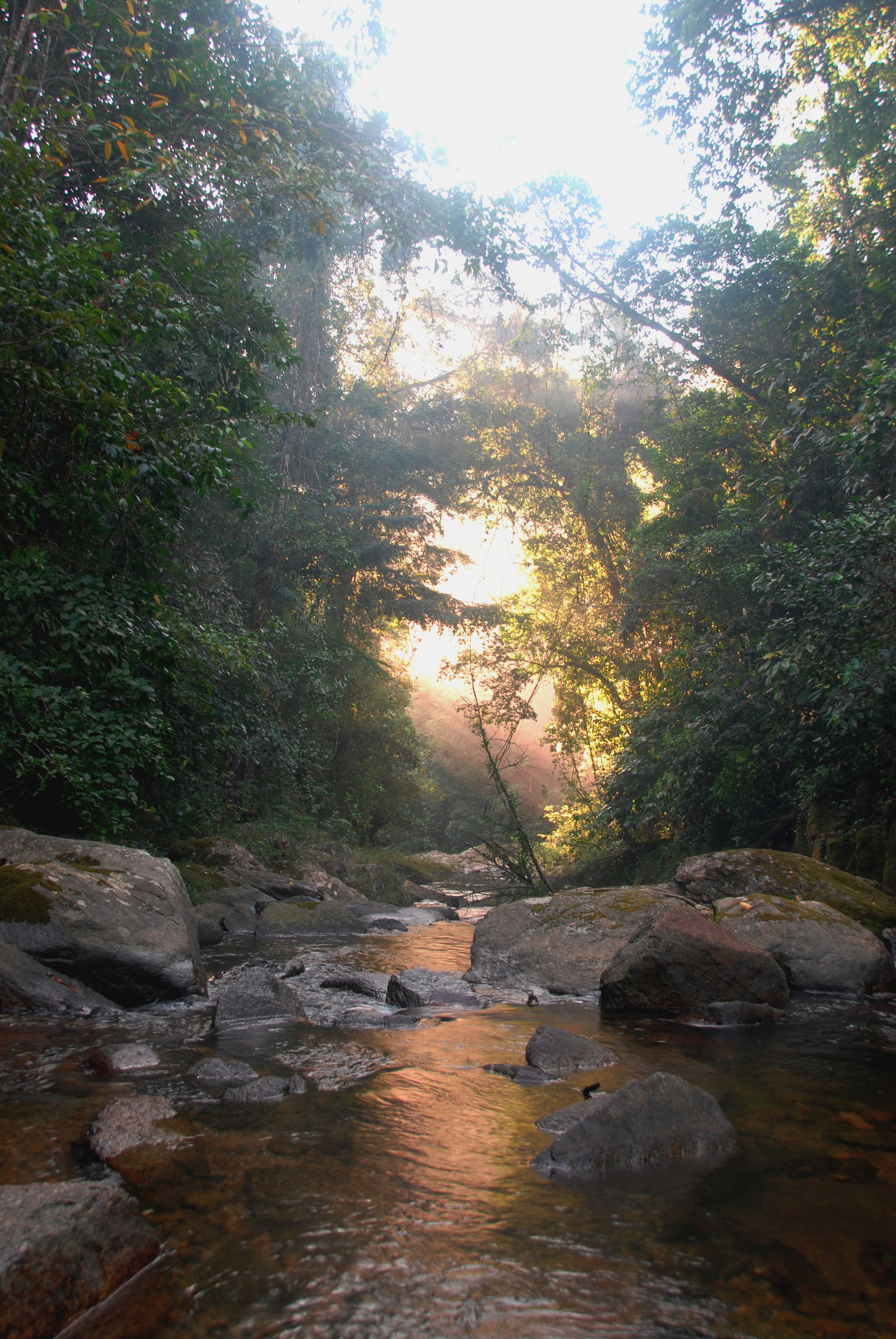
- Central River at sunrise

- Location within Belize
- Location: Toledo, Belize
- Coordinates: 16.491°N 88.886°W
- Area: 99,796 acres (40,386 ha)
- Website: yaaxche.org

Bladen Nature Reserve in Belize is a landscape of caves, sinkholes, streams and rivers, old growth rainforest and an abundance of highly diverse flora and fauna which includes a great deal of rare and endemic species.

Widely described as the crown jewel of Belize's protected areas, Bladen is considered to be one of the most biodiversity-rich, and geographically unique areas within the Mesoamerican Biological Corridor. At 99,796 acres (40,386 ha) Bladen forms a significant portion of the Key Biodiversity Area of the Maya Mountains which was identified as one of the most important blocks of protected areas within Belize. Mesoamerica, itself a region considered a world ‘hotspot for species diversity’ and considered critical for the preservation of the biodiversity of the Western Hemisphere is another protected area included in Belize.

At its most sheltered points, west of the rugged karst (limestone) hills, Bladen has protection from many of the destructive storms that hit the Caribbean coastline, resulting in a forest with a little-disturbed structure, tall trees of impressive stature and intact ecosystems. The large number of ecosystems encompassed within the nature reserve highlights its importance as a strictly protected conservation area. Bladen protects species diversity across a great range of elevations, which according to recent evidence includes several potential new and endemic species.

Within the Maya Mountains, Bladen forms a crucial link between Cockscomb Basin Wildlife Sanctuary to the northeast and Columbia River Forest Reserve to the southwest. Chiquibul National Park and Forest Reserve lie to the northwest, connecting to the protected areas system in Guatemala. With the rapid clearance of forested areas throughout Central America, this is part of the last remaining large, relatively intact block of forest within the region – the Selva Maya - stretching from Belize through to Guatemala and Mexico.

This large expanse of primarily forested uplands and valleys is essential for the survival of species such as the jaguar, scarlet macaw, white-lipped peccary and harpy eagle, which need large contiguous forest stretches in order to maintain viable populations.

== Management ==
Bladen is one of three nature reserves within Belize, and is managed through partnership between the Government of Belize and the Ya'axché Conservation Trust (Ya’axché). Ya’axché took over management in December 2008 and has a letter of intent from the Belize Forest Department to co-manage the protected area. Ya'axché now assumes responsibility for the day-to-day management of the reserve.

== Characteristics ==
=== Ecosystem services ===
Bladen Nature Reserve provides global environmental benefits by providing clean air, functioning as a carbon sink, rainfall generation, and preserving genetic diversity. On a more local scale Bladen functions as a sanctuary for birds and mammals which are subject to hunting for bushmeat, with this large contiguous block of undisturbed rainforest these game species are able to increase population size thus creating a ‘spillover effect’ onto community lands where they may be hunted as a source of protein by indigenous Mayan communities which buffer Bladen and who have traditionally lived off the products of these forests.

Bladen Nature Reserve's role in watershed protection within the area is also important, with the river system providing water for local communities and large agricultural areas on the coastal plain. The watershed drains into the Caribbean Sea 26 km (16 mi) to the east, with the Belize Barrier Reef - the second largest barrier reef in the world - lying offshore, reliant on the quality of the water. Bladen, along with Cockscomb Basin Wildlife Sanctuary protects the upper waters and tributaries of the Monkey River, ensuring that it provides the major benefits of watershed protection and management to the coastal plain areas, including water supply, water quality, flood control, sediment control, quality of fish stocks, biodiversity, and habitat preservation. Furthermore, Bladen protects the steeper slopes of the watershed areas, which, if cleared, would cause rapid erosion and sedimentation problems, not only within the river system downstream, but also on the sea grass and out on the fragile coral reef.

=== Geology and landforms ===
Bladen Nature Reserve encompasses much of the Upper Bladen Watershed, and is composed essentially of two geomorphological areas - the granite / volcanic slopes rising to the crest of the Maya Divide to the north west, and the limestone karst to the south, both draining into the flat, alluvial plain of the Bladen Branch itself. Between these two, lies the Bladen Branch valley, draining to the northeast.

The geology of Bladen follows this general topography, being divided into two geomorphological areas running parallel to each other. The ridge of metamorphosed sedimentary rocks, known as the Santa Rosa Group, with localized granite intrusions, is part of the main Maya Mountain range, which was subjected to tectonic uplift along two major fault systems – the Northern Boundary Fault to the north, and Quartz Ridge / Bladen Fault during the Triassic period, accompanied by intrusion by granite. In the early Cretaceous period oceanic waters flooded the area and fossiliferous limestones were deposited over the entire Maya Mountains.

The beginning of the Paleogene Period (65 million years ago) saw renewed tectonic uplift of the Maya Mountains (Table 5) resulting in the formation of an upland plateau, and shaping the present topography of the Maya Massif. This plateau dips gently to the west, whilst the steep eastern edge of this plateau has been eroded by numerous streams to form the series of steep sided valleys leading down from the Maya Divide, that form the relief in Cockscomb, Bladen and Columbia Forest.

To the east and south-east lies rugged limestone topography of steep, conical hills pocked by vertical-sided sinkholes, underground streams and caves. Water is scarce in this karst landscape, especially during the dry months, resulting in the presence of a vegetation type adapted to seasonally drier conditions, and a seasonal migration of wildlife to the lowlands. Smaller streams that emerge as springs within the hill slopes then disappear underground again after flowing a short distance – a characteristic of this limestone topography. Only the Bladen, flowing over the porphrytic Bladen Volcanic Member (an area composed of lavas and associated extrusive volcanic sediments that lies between the Santa Rosa Group and the limestone hills), runs permanently throughout the year.

=== Soils ===
Two major soil and land use studies have taken place in Belize – the first a comprehensive study of the whole country by Wright et al. (1959), looking at soils and associated vegetation assemblages in great detail. The second is a more recent study by King et al. (1986) based on Wright et al. (1959) but using techniques such as satellite imagery to update the original report. Soils within Bladen are dependent on the underlying geology, and can be divided broadly into soils derived from limestone rocks, and those with granitic origins.

Constantly Lime Enriched Soils and Intermittently Lime Enriched Soils: These are soils of the Toledo Foothills - densely dissected, steeply sloping limestone hills. Much of the land consists of karst topography of sloping towers and sink holes, produced by differential limestone solution. The steeper regions are very prone to erosion, and therefore unsuitable for agriculture.

Acidic Soils: These acidic soils are derived from the granite upland areas of the Richardson Peak Mountains Land System that form the western slopes of the Bladen Basin. These steep mountainous slopes of the Maya Mountains – over 25° angle between 80 and 1,120 metres (260 and 3,670 ft) altitude, overlie Santa Rosa Group metasediment rocks, producing non-alluvial, shallow soils on the slopes, or deeper colluvial deposits that collect at the base of the hillslopes following erosion. Vegetation characteristic of this soil type is evergreen broadleaf forest, shrubland and pine at higher altitudes.

Recent Soils: The most recent soils are in the north-east of Bladen, following the line of the floodplain of Bladen Branch and Richardson Creek, and laid down by these streams as they drain the Richardson Peak Mountains and karst hills to either side, and also the volcanic porphyrite. These fertile, alluvial soils are built up by regular flood events, with the characteristics of the Toledo Floodplain soils, and have led to incursions into the area by people wanting to settle new farming areas.

== Hydrology ==
The Upper Bladen drainage is a tributary of the Monkey River, the fourth largest watershed catchments in Belize with an estimated drainage area of 1,275 km^{2} (492 sq mi). In the upper reaches, on the south-east slope of the Maya Divide, the water flows off steep terrain, carving deep valleys through the landscape, and is protected within three contiguous protected areas – Bladen Nature Reserve, Cockscomb Basin Wildlife Sanctuary and Maya Mountain Forest Reserve. To the south, this drainage basin is bordered by karstic ridge crests. Within Bladen, this trellis of fast flowing streams meet to form Bladen Branch, draining the extruded Bladen volcanic rock and limestone to the one side, and the granite and sedimentary rock to the other, flowing through an alluvial plain and meandering eastwards, exiting the protected area, and flowing on to join the Swasey on entering the coastal plain.

To the south-east, a limited number of the karstic streams form the headwaters of Golden Stream, and to the south east, the Rio Grande watersheds.

Of the three water system categories – upper reaches (headwaters), middle reaches, and lower reaches (estuarine) - only two (upper and middle reaches) are represented within Bladen, as the protected area has no direct contact with the coastal areas. The majority of the streams and creeks draining the hill slopes within Bladen fall within the upper, or ‘headwaters’ category, characterized by fast running streams, waterfalls, pools and riffles, often carved deep into the bedrock, with tropical broadleaf forest on either bank, branches meeting overhead and shading the water.

These upper reach streams then join to form Bladen Branch further downstream in the middle reaches of the river system, the water flowing through a narrow floodplain, with little variation in gradient. The character of the waterway changes from the fast moving streams of the headwaters to slower, wider, deeper, meandering rivers, interspersed in places with shallower riffles.

Dependent on the geology of the area, the river systems of the Monkey River watershed can be divided into two different categories - those rivers that drain granite and Santa Rosa Group metasediments (tributaries of South Stann Creek, Swasey Branch and Trio), and those that drain the Bladen volcanic rock and surrounding limestone (Richardson Creek and other southern tributaries of Bladen Branch). The water of rivers draining the granite and metasediments is rich in phosphorus, though with low nitrogen levels, low conductivity and a basic pH. Conversely Bladen Branch, draining the volcanic rock and adjacent limestone, is low in phosphorus, but has a higher level of nitrogen, high conductivity, and a neutral pH.

The differing phosphorus levels have a very strong bearing on the flora and fauna found within these rivers (Esselman, pers. com.). Phosphorus is particularly important as a plant growth promoter in freshwater systems, resulting in more abundant aquatic plant life (especially Marathrum oxycarpum), providing greater shelter and food resources, enabling greater aquatic invertebrate abundance and biomass – which can be expected to result in an increased abundances and biomass of fish. M. oxycarpum is present at elevated levels in South Stann Creek, Swasey Branch and Trio Branch, all of which drain areas of granite and metasediments, and can be expected to show far greater abundance of plant life than the phosphorus-poor Bladen Branch and Richardson Creek.

=== Habitats ===
The forests of Bladen Nature Reserve are evergreen in the valleys and on the lower slopes, semi-evergreen (25-50% deciduous trees) on the upper slopes, and semi-deciduous (5-75% deciduous trees) on the ridge. Forest stature decreases with increasing elevation from the valleys to the ridges, with a corresponding decrease in the density of large trees. This largely reflects edaphic drought associated with rapid drainage on the steep limestone topography. Recent studies of phytogeography have demonstrated a significant affinity between the flora of the Greater Antilles and the upper limestone ridges of the Bladen Nature Reserve, indicating a far more complex regional phytogeography than previously suspected.

Twenty ecosystems have been identified within the Bladen area, ranging from broadleaf lowland hill forest to submontane forest, riparian shrubland and short grass savannah.

At the ecosystem level, the Bladen Nature Reserve plays a critical role as a core conservation area, protecting over 5% of the national extent of 11 ecosystems. 10 of these ecosystems have more than 15% of their total national coverage within the protected area, 5 of which have over one third of the total national coverage occurring within the boundaries of Bladen Nature Reserve. Each of these ecosystems is confined to rugged terrain in the higher rainfall areas of southern Belize.

== Flora ==
With its diversity of altitude, geology, aspect and hydrology, Bladen Nature Reserve offers perhaps the most diverse range of conditions for plant life of any protected area in Belize (Figure 7). A significant portion of the plants recorded to date are specialists – associated with a narrow ecological zone. This complexity is enhanced by the seasonality experienced by the limestone substrata and associated soils (Brewer et al. 2003). Whilst the 1994 REA recognized only 9 ecosystems (as compared with the 20 mapped by Meerman & Sabido), they found that 73% of the approximately 300 plant species they identified were specific to single ecosystems. This suggests a far higher prevalence of ecological specialization in the flora of Bladen than is typical in Belize. Plant associations are reported to link the flora of some of the upper elevations within Bladen with the flora of the Antillean archipelago (S. Brewer, pers. com.). A number of plant species that occur in these upper elevations of Bladen and the contiguous portions in Chiquibul National Park are found nowhere else in Belize (J. Marlin, pers. com.).

Whilst the lowlands of Bladen were repeatedly logged, albeit at low levels, up until about 1970, the steep terrain of much of the reserve was not conducive to extensive logging far beyond the most accessible valleys and adjacent slopes. Snake Creek, in SW Bladen, was the most remote portion that was logged. As a result of this limitation to the extent of logging activities, and the fact that legal commercial logging has not taken place for 35 years, Bladen is now considered as one of the most pristine environments in Belize.

== Fauna ==
This large expanse of primarily forested uplands and valleys is essential for the survival of species such as the scarlet macaw, white-lipped peccary and harpy eagle, which need large contiguous forest stretches in order to maintain viable populations.

93 species of mammal, 337 species of birds and 92 herptiles are considered confirmed for Bladen, either through being recorded within the protected area, or being recorded in both the contiguous protected areas to the north and south (Cockscomb Basin Wildlife Sanctuary and Columbia River Forest Reserve - Bladen is expected to have significant species overlap with these two adjacent protected areas). Bladen is also expected to share some of the species recorded in the montane forest areas of Doyle's Delight, and the majority of those of the more intensively studied BFREE property.

The majority of species of concern listed for Cockscomb and Columbia River Forest Reserve are considered to be protected by Bladen as well, though in some cases this needs verification through further fieldwork in the area. Of these, 19 are considered of international concern at species level under the IUCN Red List (critically endangered, endangered, vulnerable or at least risk/near threatened). A further two are considered of international concern at sub-species level; the Central American spider monkey (Ateles geoffroyi spp. yucatanensis) and the tayra (Eira barbara ssp. senex).

=== Mammals ===
With its forested slopes, riparian vegetation, valleys and rugged limestone landscapes, Bladen Nature Reserve is home to a wide variety of mammal species typical of tropical moist broadleaf forest. Of the 163 species of mammal recorded within Belize that could potentially be found in the protected area based on the assumption of similar ecosystems, 93 species are recorded as present within Bladen Nature Reserve itself.

When the entire Maya Mountain block of east-slope protected areas of contiguous ecosystems is considered (Cockscomb Basin Wildlife Sanctuary, Bladen Nature Reserve and Columbia River Forest Reserve), the number of species that could be present increases to 110 species – 67% of the total number of mammal species recorded for Belize, partly as a result of specialized species surveys into groups such as the small rodents and bats. Bladen is therefore highlighted as a vital conservation area within the protected areas system, making a major contribution towards the maintenance of biodiversity in Belize. Its isolated nature and the lack of access have led to buffering it has with the presence of the other protected areas and the BFREE lands should enable it to continue its role in protecting both threatened and non-threatened species.

The Yucatan black howler monkey (Alouatta pigra), one of the two primate species recorded from the area, is endemic to a small area of the Yucatan Peninsula, Belize and the Peten. This species was decimated by a yellow fever epidemic in 1956/1957 that swept through the Alouatta population throughout most of the country. Pockets of viable populations remained, including those in Columbia River Forest Reserve and Bladen Nature Reserve, whilst in other areas further north, such as Cockscomb Basin Wildlife Reserve, the epidemic was compounded by other impacts such as the effects of Hurricane Hattie in 1961, and by local hunting pressure, extirpating the local population by 1978. There was a notable lack of howler monkeys in Bladen during both the 1987 and 1994 surveys, attributed to the yellow fever - however enquiries into the howler monkey populations in the area, among traditional users – chicleros and hunters – suggest that this species has been continuously present in the area, and it is presently considered to have a healthy population (Marlin, pers. com.). This may be important for the replenishment of the coastal population following the population crash and social disorganization experienced after Hurricane Iris in 2001. With increasing habitat fragmentation and loss throughout its range, Alouatta pigra has recently been upgraded to endangered in the IUCN Red Book.

The second species, the Central American spider monkey (Ateles geoffroyi), appears to be more restricted to the forested hill slopes, overlapping less with the coastal areas of human impact. The Belize sub-species, Ateles geoffroyi yucatanensis, is listed as vulnerable (IUCN, 2005), reflecting the decreasing population in the region, primarily through habitat destruction.

Baird's tapir (Tapirus bairdii) is the largest herbivore present in Bladen, and tends to be associated particularly with riparian areas where it grazes on the herbaceous vegetation. Both the 1984 and the 1997 studies reported frequent sightings of tracks, suggesting that this species is widespread through the lowland areas of the nature reserve (Brokaw et al.). Whilst listed as an endangered species internationally, it is widespread in Belize, where it is seldom hunted, however, there have been recent reports of a tapir carcass killed adjacent to the protected area, with indications that it had been killed for the meat (Muschamp, pers. com, 2005), and there are reports that tapir is considered a traditional delicacy by the Garifuna communities (community consultations). The main threat to this species in Belize is the increasing land use change, with the destruction of suitable habitat - the protection of significant tracts of unfragmented riparian vegetation and other suitable habitat is now considered a priority for its continued survival.

The Neotropical river otter (Lontra longicaudis) has been recorded within the protected area, this species being closely associated with the river system, where its presence indicates healthy fish stocks and little human disturbance. All five of the cat species found in Belize, jaguar, ocelot, jaguarundi, puma and margay are reported to be present within the Bladen area, suggesting that there is a good prey base to support these key predators (Marlin, pers. com.).

Two peccary species are recorded from Bladen, the collared peccary (Tayassu tajacu) and the white-lipped peccary (Dicotyles pecari). Whilst there is some illegal hunting pressure, populations are considered good. The larger D. pecari, travels in large herds, and requires extensive contiguous areas of unfragmented broadleaf forest (20,000 hectares being estimated as the minimum dynamic area to support a viable population) – the Maya Mountain block of contiguous protected areas contributes significantly to the conservation of these species, ensuring that there is sufficient broadleaf forest in the overall area to maintain this key species. Records of white-lipped peccary in the higher altitude areas of the Maya Divide in Columbia River Forest Reserve. suggest that they may also move from one drainage system to another over the mountain passes of the Maya Divide, maintaining a genetically diverse population throughout the Maya Mountain block of protected areas.

Mammal distribution in the karst area is reported as seasonal, with many larger species such as white lipped and collared peccary migrating to the coastal plains along the riparian forest routes as the water sources start to dry up in the steep limestone hills during the dry season. As the coastal savannas become flooded during the wet season, these species then move back to the foothills once again. Predators, principally jaguar, are thought to follow this migration. Whilst this has been possible in past years, the current rate of fragmentation of forest habitat and increase in human presence, with the agricultural development along the Southern Highway and the associated hunting pressure, is making this migration less viable, isolating the eastern hill slopes from the coastal areas, with their more accessible water sources. Initiatives such as YCT's Golden Stream corridor and TIDE's Block 127 provide the crucial link between the two, and will be an important factor in the long term viability of larger mammal species in this southern area of Bladen.

=== Birds ===
Bladen Nature Reserve is considered to have a particularly rich and diverse avifauna. 337 species have been recorded to date within the boundaries (based on surveys conducted within the protected area), this is anticipated to climb to as many as 357 species, from knowledge of species recorded in adjacent protected areas of similar ecosystem types (Columbia River Forest Reserve Cockscomb Basin Wildlife Sanctuary and Doyle's Delight) – representing 62% of the total bird species currently recorded for Belize.

Bladen Nature Reserve contains a wide variety of ecosystems, ranging from the fertile floodplain vegetation to the higher elevations of the Maya Mountains. This has resulted in the high species richness observed within the area. The majority of the species are lowland broadleaf forest generalists, found throughout much of Belize. The floodplain of Bladen Branch also attracts many of the riverine, forest edge and gallery forest species, such as the bare-throated tiger heron (Tigrisoma mexicanum), the agami heron (Agamia agami) and Muscovy duck (Cairina moschata), the white-necked jacobin (Florisuga mellivora) and yellow-tailed oriole (Icterus mesomelas). Other species closely associated with water have also been recorded – the various kingfishers, spotted sandpiper (Actitis macularia) and the two species of waterthrush.

Whilst the higher elevations within Bladen have not yet been studied, those of Columbia River Forest Reserve and Doyle's Delight (within Chiquibul Forest Reserve) have both been the focus of expeditions with experienced ornithologists recording the avifauna. These areas are contiguous with those of Bladen, and from the data at these two sites, there appears to be almost complete species overlap. With these areas being so remote and inaccessible, there has also been the addition of new species records for Belize, such as the scaly-throated foliage-gleaner (Anabacerthia variegaticeps) (Doyle's Delight Expedition, 1989), and tawny-throated leaftosser (Doyle's Delight Expedition, 1993; Little Quartz Ridge, Jones, 1997). Two Neotropical migrants - chuck-will's-widow (Caprimulgus carolinesis) and the warbling vireo (Vireo galvus) - were also recorded for the first time, in Columbia River Forest Reserve in 1992, and may be present in the higher altitude areas of Bladen Nature Reserve.

Bladen has two large resident game bird species, the great curassow (Crax rubra) and crested guan (Penelope purpurascens). Both these species, along with their more common relative, the plain chachalaca, are representatives of the family Cracidae – the most threatened of the Neotropical bird families and common hunting targets. Cracids are important seed dispersers and are a major protein source for local communities. Within Belize, both the curassow and the guan are locally common, and outside of protected areas such as Bladen, they are legal game species for those with hunting permits. However, the increase in agricultural colonists and seasonal Central American workers adjacent to the nature reserve has led to increased illegal hunting within the protected area, resulting in reduced populations of both species. This was noted by the 1992 and 1997 expeditions to Columbia River Forest Reserve directly south of Bladen, with reports that game species were unexpectedly scarce in even the upper elevations, suggesting increasing hunting pressure, with relatively easy access from Guatemala. Whether this is impacting Bladen itself is currently unknown, but the implications are that these areas, once considered pristine, should now be considered under threat. This pronounced negative response to hunting pressure makes these two species especially valuable as indicator species in areas where hunting still occurs.

Of particular note is the presence of a number of species in the protected area considered endangered or vulnerable, and in need of protection within Belize. These include one of the two large game species (the great curassow), and the keel-billed motmot (Electron carinatum). The near threatened harpy eagle (Harpia harpyia) has also been recorded from Bladen (Marlin, pers. com., 2006, 2010) and in December 2010 researchers from Belize Foundation for Research and Environmental Education (BFREE) discovered a breeding pair of harpy eagles with a chick, the first recorded in Belize and also representing the extreme of their northerly range. The rare solitary eagle (Harpyhaliaetus solitarius) has been recorded from the adjacent Cockscomb Basin Wildlife Sanctuary and Doyle's Delight, with a high probability that its range includes Bladen. Other birds highlighted as being of concern include the second large game species crested guan (P. purpurascens), the ornate hawk-eagle (Spizaetus ornatus), and seasonally, the regionally endangered subspecies of the scarlet macaw (Ara Macao).

=== Herpetofauna ===
A total of 92 species have been recorded to date in Bladen Nature Reserve: 24 amphibians, 1 crocodilian, 6 freshwater turtles, 21 lizards and 40 snakes. These include ubiquitous generalists (such as Incilius valliceps and Dendropsophus microcephalus, along with species with ranges restricted to the mid-to upper elevations of the Maya Mountains within their range in Belize – species such as Morelet's tree-frog (Agalychnis moreletii), Lithobates juliani, Smilisca cyanosticta and most of the eleutherodactylids. Through analysis of the known and predicted ranges of Belize's herpetofauna, and of their habitat requirements, it can be estimated that the total number of species likely to occur within Bladen Nature Reserve is between 108 and 114 species (with a maximum possibly as high as 124).

Ten species are considered to be of international concern (IUCN Red List), and of the additional 22-32 species that are likely to occur in the protected area (but which have not yet been recorded there), a further four are considered to be of international concern (IUCN Red List) – the endangered Sanderson's rainfrog (Craugastor sandersoni), and the near threatened Doflein's salamander (Bolitoglossa dofleini), broad-headed rainfrog (Craugastor laticeps), and blue-spotted Mexican tree frog (Smilisca cyanosticta). A series of expeditions in Bladen in 2011 is expected to confirm the presence of some or all of these species.

== Status and access ==
Bladen's status as an IUCN category 1a nature reserve means that it is afforded the highest level of protection possible to a protected area. It is one of only three nature reserves in Belize and, in addition to the 24-hour presence of trained rangers, only researchers with valid permits issued by the Forest Department and student groups (within a designated education zone) are permitted within the boundaries of the reserve. Tourism is strictly forbidden.

== Cultural heritage ==
For many years it was assumed that the steep and rugged terrain of Bladen would have been of little interest to the Ancient Maya, with difficult access and little cultivatable land. Exploration in the early 1900s by chicleros and mahogany extractors suggested however that the Maya had indeed settled the Bladen system, later confirmed by the Maya Mountain Archaeological Project (MMAP), which worked in the Bladen area for two successive years (1993 and 1994).

It would appear that the Bladen area was an important extraction area particularly for mineral resources. Whilst the density of settlement is considered to have been low in comparison with the coastal plain, during the Late Terminal Classic (AD 700 – 900) virtually all inhabitable land is considered to have been occupied, though Dunham estimates that there would have been no more than 10,000 people residing in the Bladen watershed at any one time during the Maya occupancy. The discovery of a Mixtec style vessel during the 1994 fieldwork indicates that the settlements had wide-ranging contacts, even when much of the southern lowland populations were in decline. Three areas have been highlighted by the MMAP: Quebrada de Oro, Snake Creek and the Esperanza Valley.

Two sites in the Quebrada de Oro area were discussed during early fieldwork in Bladen. Both sites were located on the alluvial soils of the valley, one a minor settlement, the second a more structured site of plazas and structures, with outlying mounds. This second site lies on the steep bank of the Quebrada, which in 1984 was eroding inwards towards the site. Looting activity was observed at both sites. These sites were later revisited during the Maya Mountain Archaeological Project.

In 1994, further work by the MMAP located three unlooted sites of considerable complexity within the Snake Creek and Esperanza areas. Whilst the south-eastern lower valley of Snake Creek is steep sided and was uninhabited in Maya times, the good agricultural soils of the north-western upper valley was found to have supported a modest Late Terminal Classic community with well constructed house mounds in complex groupings, with two main plazas flanked by an extensive range of structures. This site, named "Saach'olil" by the MMAP, is located on the creek bank, which is eroding its banks to gradually destroy the site.

During the same field season, Esperanza valley was discovered to have three sites, two of which are inside Bladen Nature Reserve, in its southwesternmost corner. "Chac Bolai", situated on the valley floor of the Central River, is a moderately sized site found to consist of a large civic plaza, connected by a causeway to low temple mounds, with minor adjoining causeways. To the south lies "K'antulai", located on the primary access route, straddling the mountain pass, and thought to have regulated the movement of people and goods into the Esperanza area during the Late Terminal Classic era. Unlike the majority of other sites, this fortress-like settlement, consisting of a long chain of structures (including a main, central plaza flanked by large structures), lies in an area of poor soils, distant from the nearest water supplies.

All three of these structures were unlooted in 1994; however, with the increasing knowledge of these sites, and the continued access by hunters to the area and Guatemalan Xateros from the west, it is unlikely that they are still intact. Anecdotal reports from as far as Gales Point suggest major looting activity within the Bladen Nature Reserve a few years ago, highlighting the need to maintain effective patrolling, and greater targeted monitoring of activity at the archaeological sites within the reserve.

In 2022 a study of DNA found in multiple Bladen rock shelters was reported. 50 individuals were directly dated with radiocarbon, and found to have lived between 1000 and 9600 years ago. The oldest appeared have migrated from North America, but the majority had migrated from South America, bringing improved maize plants with them.

== Threats ==
Despite the environmental and social importance of Bladen, threats such as expansion of adjacent agricultural areas, hunting, illegal extraction and development ventures have the potential to severely impact the integrity of the reserve and must be accounted and planned for appropriately. The most pressing threats are currently the advancing illegal xaté palm collectors, known as Xateros, who are causing widespread extirpations of xaté and impacting populations of game species by illegally hunting during xaté palm collecting expeditions. As mentioned above, looting of Mayan archaeological sites is also an important issue.

Another major threat comes from poorly planned and unsustainable development particularly from hydroelectric speculators. In 2009 Bladen was illegally entered by a hydroelectric company who were conducting a feasibility study for a potential hydroelectric dam on the Central River which forms the boundary between Bladen and Columbia River Forest Reserve. A litigation imposed by Ya’axché is currently pending an appeal in the courts.
