= Geography of Belize =

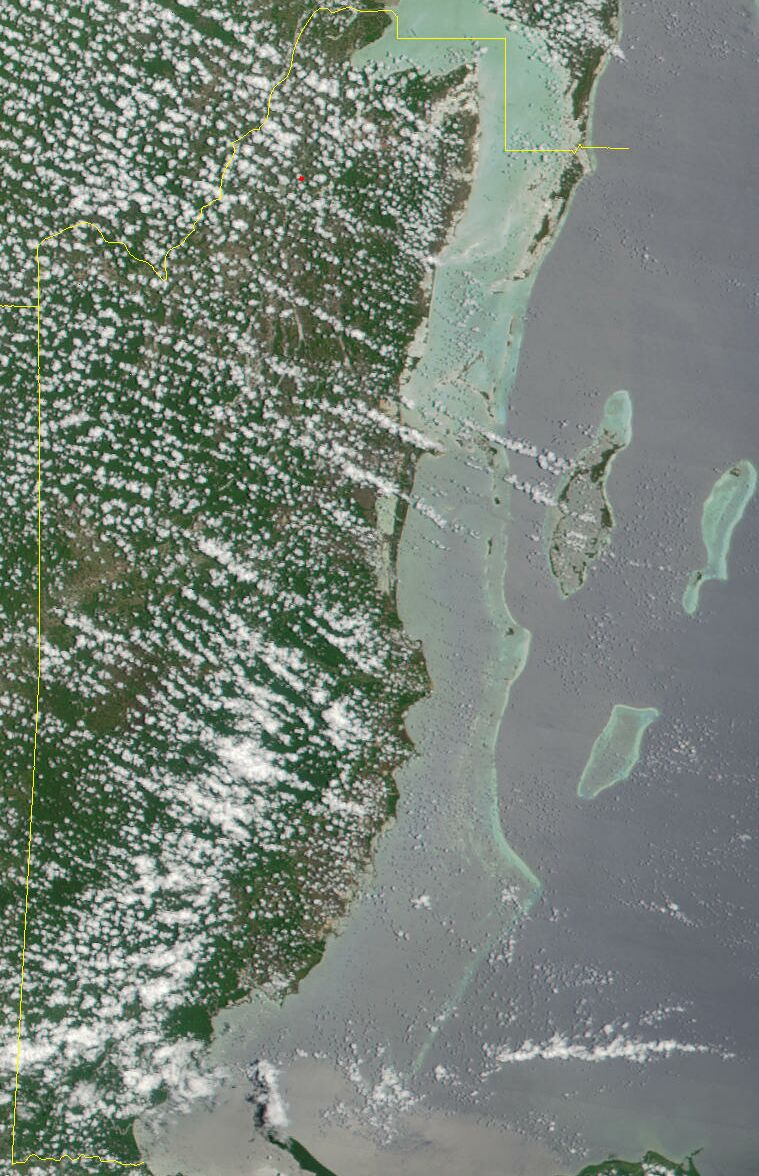
- Continent: Americas
- Region: Central America
- Coordinates: 17°15′N 88°45′W
- Area: Ranked 147th
  - Total: 22,966 km^{2} (8,867 sq mi)
  - Land: 99.3%
  - Water: 0.7%
- Coastline: 386 km (240 mi)
- Borders: Total land borders: 542 km (337 mi); Guatemala 266 km (165 mi), Mexico 276 km (171 mi)
- Highest point: Doyle's Delight; 1,124 m (3,688 ft)
- Lowest point: Caribbean Sea; 0 m (0 ft)
- Longest river: Belize River; 290 km (180 mi)
- Largest lake: New River Lagoon; 13.5 km^{2} (5.2 sq mi)
- Exclusive economic zone: 35,351 km^{2} (13,649 mi^{2})

Belize is a small Central American nation, located at 17°15' north of the equator and 88°45' west of the Prime Meridian on the Yucatán Peninsula. It borders the Caribbean Sea to the east, with 386 km of coastline. It has a total of 542 km of land borders—Mexico to the north-northwest (272 km) and Guatemala to the south-southwest (266 km). Belize's total size is 22,966 km^{2} (8,867 sq mi), of which 22,806 km^{2} (8,805 sq mi) is land and 160 km^{2} (62 sq mi) is water.

Belize is the only country in Central America without a Pacific coastline. Many coral reefs, cays, and islands to the east—such as Ambergris Caye, Lighthouse Reef, Glover's Reef, and the Turneffe Islands—are part of Belize's territory, forming the Belize Barrier Reef, the longest in the western hemisphere stemming approximately 322 km (200 mi) and the second longest in the world after the Great Barrier Reef. Belize's largest river is the eponymous Belize River. Belize's lowest elevation is at sea level. Its highest point is Doyle's Delight at 1,124 m (3,688 ft).

The climate in Belize is tropical, with a rainy season from June to November and a dry season from January to May. Natural hazards include hurricanes (mostly in the late Atlantic hurricane season, September to December) and coastal flooding, especially in the south.

Earthquakes also occurred in southern Belize but infrequent despite located beyond North American plate–circum-Caribbean plate at the southeastern edge.

== Physical features ==
Topographical feature divide the Belizean landscape into two main physiographic regions. The most visually striking of these regions is distinguished by the Maya Mountains and the associated basins and plateaus that dominate all but the narrow coastal plain in the southern half of the country. The mountains rise to heights of about 1,100 metres, with the highest point being Doyle's Delight (1,124 m) in the Cockscomb Range, a spur of the Maya Mountains in Western Belize. Covered with shallow, highly erodible soils of low fertility, these heavily forested highlands are very sparsely inhabited.

The second region comprises the northern lowlands, along with the southern coastal plain. Eighteen major rivers and many perennial streams drain these low-lying areas. The coastline is flat and swampy, with many lagoons, especially in the northern and central parts of the country. Westward from the northern coastal areas, the terrain changes from mangrove swamp to tropical pine savanna and hardwood forest. The country's largest lake is the approximately 13.5 km^{2} (5.2 sq mi) New River Lagoon.

Map of Belize's exclusive economic zone

Belize claims an exclusive economic zone of 35,351 km^{2} (13,649 mi^{2}) with 200 nautical miles (370.4 km; 230.2 mi) and a territorial sea of 12 nautical miles (22.2 km; 13.8 mi). From the mouth of the Sarstoon River to Ranguana Cay, Belize's territorial sea is 3 nmi (5.6 km; 3.5 mi); according to Belize's Maritime Areas Act, 1992, the purpose of this limitation is to provide a framework for the negotiation of a definitive agreement on territorial differences with Guatemala.

Belize is the only country in Central America without a coastline on the North Pacific Ocean.

=== Rivers ===
The interlocking networks of rivers, creeks, and lagoons have played a key role in the historical geography of Belize. The largest and most historically important river is the Belize River, which drains more than one-quarter of the country as it winds along the northern edge of the Maya Mountains across the center of the country to the sea near Belize City. Also known as the Old River, the Belize River is navigable up to the Guatemalan border and served as the main artery of commerce and communication between the interior and the coast until well into the twentieth century.

Other historically important rivers include the Sibun River, which drains the northeastern edge of the Maya Mountains, and the New River, which flows through the northern sugar-growing areas before emptying into Chetumal Bay. Both of these river valleys possess fertile alluvial soils and have supported considerable cultivation and human settlement.

=== Forests ===
In Belize forest cover is around 56% of the total land area, equivalent to 1,277,050 hectares (ha) of forest in 2020, down from 1,600,030 hectares (ha) in 1990. In 2020, naturally regenerating forest covered 1,274,670 hectares (ha) and planted forest covered 2,390 hectares (ha). Of the naturally regenerating forest 0% was reported to be primary forest (consisting of native tree species with no clearly visible indications of human activity) and around 59% of the forest area was found within protected areas.

=== REDD+ forest reference level and monitoring ===
Under the UNFCCC REDD+ framework, Belize has submitted national forest reference level benchmarks for results-based payments. On the UNFCCC REDD+ Web Platform, Belize’s 2020 submission is listed as having an assessed reference level, while a 2024 submission is listed as under technical assessment; the platform also lists a national strategy, safeguards information, and a reported national forest monitoring system for the 2024 package.

The first assessed national FRL was submitted in 2020 and technically assessed in 2021. It covered all five REDD+ activities at national scale and set projected annual benchmark values for 2016–2020, rising from 4,606,875 to 5,583,087 t CO2 eq per year, based on linear extrapolation of historical net emissions and removals for 2001–2015. The technical assessment reported that the FRL included above-ground and below-ground biomass and accounted for CO2, methane (CH_{4}) and nitrous oxide (N_{2}O) from biomass burning, while excluding dead organic matter (including litter) and soil organic carbon.

Belize has also reported a National Forest Monitoring System (NFMS) covering 2001–2020. The NFMS document describes a system that combines remote sensing and ground-based forest inventory approaches, and says it is designed to support forest management, REDD+ measurement, reporting and verification, greenhouse-gas inventories, and related reporting. It states that Belize’s NFMS version 1.0 integrates a permanent plot network with a satellite land monitoring system using systematic virtual plots to detect annual land-use change, and that this information feeds into the country’s greenhouse-gas inventory, FRL submissions, biennial update report and REDD+ technical annexes.

== Climate ==
Köppen climate classification zones of Belize.

Belize has a tropical climate with pronounced wet and dry seasons, although there are significant variations in weather patterns by region. Temperatures vary according to elevation, proximity to the coast, and the moderating effects of the northeast trade winds off the Caribbean. Average temperatures in the coastal regions range from 24 °C (75 °F) in January to 27 °C (81 °F) in July. Temperatures are slightly higher inland, except for the southern highland plateaus, such as the Mountain Pine Ridge, where it is noticeably cooler year round. Overall, the seasons are marked more by differences in humidity and rainfall than in temperature.

Average rainfall varies considerably, ranging from 1,350 millimeters (53.1 in) in the north and west to over 4,500 millimeters (177.2 in) in the extreme south. Seasonal differences in rainfall are greatest in the northern and central regions of the country where, between January and April or May, fewer than 100 millimeters (3.9 in) of rain fall per month. The dry season is shorter in the south, normally only lasting from February to April. A shorter, less rainy period, known locally as the "little dry," usually occurs in late July or August, after the initial onset of the rainy season.

Climate data for Belmopan (1991–2020)
Month	Jan	Feb	Mar	Apr	May	Jun	Jul	Aug	Sep	Oct	Nov	Dec	Year
Mean daily maximum °C (°F)	28.2 (82.8)	29.7 (85.5)	31.2 (88.2)	33.5 (92.3)	34.1 (93.4)	32.7 (90.9)	32.2 (90.0)	32.6 (90.7)	32.5 (90.5)	31.2 (88.2)	29.4 (84.9)	28.6 (83.5)	31.3 (88.3)
Daily mean °C (°F)	23.7 (74.7)	24.4 (75.9)	25.5 (77.9)	27.6 (81.7)	28.6 (83.5)	28.3 (82.9)	27.7 (81.9)	27.9 (82.2)	27.9 (82.2)	26.8 (80.2)	25.1 (77.2)	24.2 (75.6)	26.5 (79.7)
Mean daily minimum °C (°F)	19.1 (66.4)	19.2 (66.6)	19.8 (67.6)	21.7 (71.1)	23.1 (73.6)	23.8 (74.8)	23.3 (73.9)	23.2 (73.8)	23.2 (73.8)	22.5 (72.5)	20.7 (69.3)	19.8 (67.6)	21.6 (70.9)
Average rainfall mm (inches)	135.2 (5.32)	51.3 (2.02)	48.5 (1.91)	41.4 (1.63)	119.3 (4.70)	259.9 (10.23)	245.3 (9.66)	226.1 (8.90)	221.8 (8.73)	244.2 (9.61)	201.9 (7.95)	134.9 (5.31)	1,929.8 (75.97)
Average rainy days (≥ 1.0 mm)	11	6	5	3	7	14	16	14	15	14	13	13	131
Mean monthly sunshine hours	170.5	189.3	241.8	255.0	248.0	189.0	201.5	207.7	171.0	182.9	165.0	150.0	2,371.7
Mean daily sunshine hours	5.5	6.7	7.8	8.5	8.0	6.3	6.5	6.7	5.7	5.9	5.5	5.0	6.5
Source: National Meteorological Service of Belize (sun 1981–2010)

Climate data for Belize City 1991–2020, extremes 1866–present
Month	Jan	Feb	Mar	Apr	May	Jun	Jul	Aug	Sep	Oct	Nov	Dec	Year
Record high °C (°F)	34.2 (93.6)	34.7 (94.5)	37.3 (99.1)	37.0 (98.6)	37.0 (98.6)	35.7 (96.3)	33.8 (92.8)	35.0 (95.0)	35.3 (95.5)	34.0 (93.2)	33.3 (91.9)	34.0 (93.2)	37.3 (99.1)
Mean daily maximum °C (°F)	27.9 (82.2)	28.8 (83.8)	29.8 (85.6)	31.2 (88.2)	31.9 (89.4)	31.7 (89.1)	31.5 (88.7)	31.8 (89.2)	31.8 (89.2)	30.6 (87.1)	29.2 (84.6)	28.3 (82.9)	30.4 (86.7)
Daily mean °C (°F)	24.3 (75.7)	25.2 (77.4)	26.1 (79.0)	27.7 (81.9)	28.5 (83.3)	28.7 (83.7)	28.4 (83.1)	28.5 (83.3)	28.3 (82.9)	27.2 (81.0)	25.6 (78.1)	24.7 (76.5)	26.9 (80.4)
Mean daily minimum °C (°F)	20.6 (69.1)	21.5 (70.7)	22.4 (72.3)	24.2 (75.6)	25.2 (77.4)	25.7 (78.3)	25.3 (77.5)	25.3 (77.5)	24.9 (76.8)	23.9 (75.0)	22.0 (71.6)	21.2 (70.2)	23.5 (74.3)
Record low °C (°F)	11.0 (51.8)	11.5 (52.7)	10.9 (51.6)	15.0 (59.0)	19.0 (66.2)	20.8 (69.4)	20.7 (69.3)	21.0 (69.8)	19.3 (66.7)	16.1 (61.0)	14.4 (57.9)	12.0 (53.6)	10.9 (51.6)
Average rainfall mm (inches)	141.4 (5.57)	64.7 (2.55)	41.0 (1.61)	58.0 (2.28)	131.8 (5.19)	236.4 (9.31)	180.2 (7.09)	195.0 (7.68)	229.8 (9.05)	305.5 (12.03)	235.8 (9.28)	150.9 (5.94)	1,970.5 (77.58)
Average rainy days (≥ 1.0 mm)	10	6	4	4	7	12	14	14	16	16	13	12	128
Average relative humidity (%)	83	82	79	77	79	82	83	84	84	83	84	84	82
Mean monthly sunshine hours	199	203	239	256	257	197	226	237	178	196	180	190	2,558
Source 1: National Meteorological Service of Belize, Meteo Climat (record highs and lows)
Source 2: Deutscher Wetterdienst (sun, 1961–1990, humidity 1975–1989) (Note: Station ID for Belize/Phillip Goldston INTL. Airport is 78583 Use this station ID to locate the sunshine duration)

=== Hurricanes ===
Hurricanes have played a devastating role in Belizean history. In 1931 an unnamed hurricane destroyed over two-thirds of the buildings in Belize City and killed more than 1,000 people. In 1955 Hurricane Janet leveled the northern town of Corozal. Six years later, Hurricane Hattie struck the central coastal area of the country, with winds in excess of 300 kilometers per hour (186 mph) and 4-meter (13.1 ft) storm tides. The devastation of Belize City for the second time in thirty years prompted the relocation of the capital some 80 kilometers (50 mi) inland to the planned city of Belmopan. A hurricane that devastated Belize was Hurricane Greta, which caused more than US$25 million in damages along the southern coast in 1978.

There was a period of 20 years that Belize was considered as a hurricane-free zone by many until Hurricane Mitch (October 1998) gave rise to hurricane awareness and the National Emergency Management Organization (NEMO). One year later Hurricane Keith hit Belize, followed the following year by Tropical Storm Chantal.

In 2001, Hurricane Iris swept through the southern part of Belize causing damage that ranged in the hundreds of millions due largely to wiping away the banana industry, crippling the citrus and tourism in the area. Six years later, the fury of Category Five Dean landed on the Yucatán coast at Mahahual and Corozal in northern Belize, was not spared the brunt of reportedly Category 3 to 4 winds. Hurricane Dean did tens of millions in damages, especially to the infantile papaya industry and to a lesser extent to the endemic sugar cane industry.

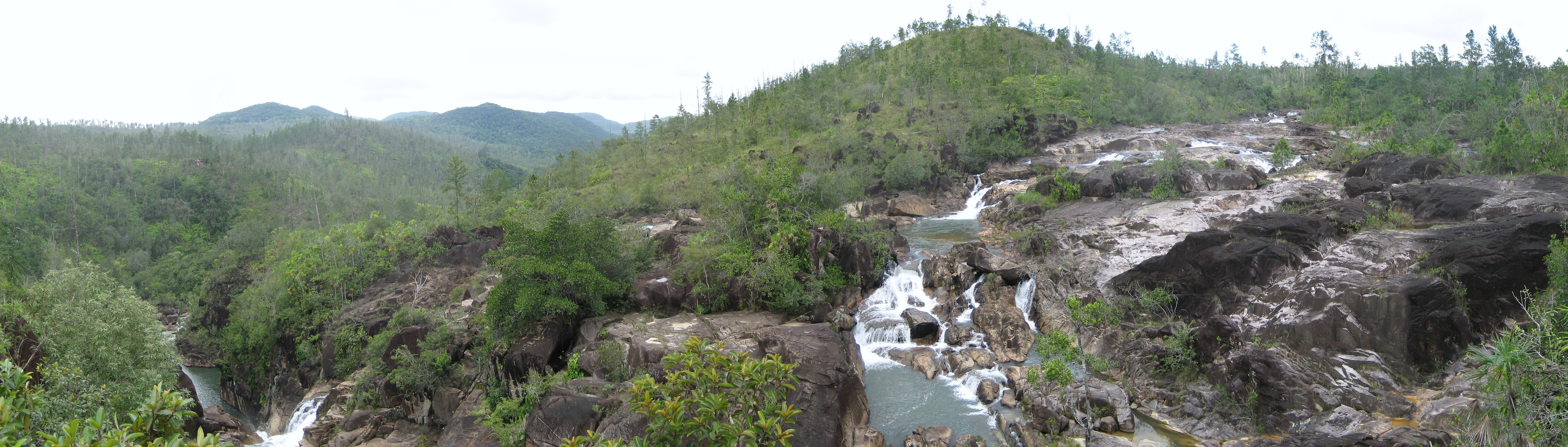
The Mountain Pine Ridge Forest Reserve, Belize.

== Geology ==
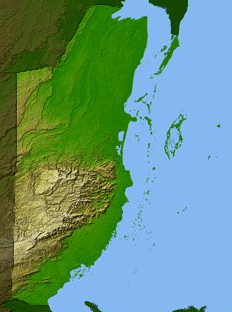
Topography of Belize

Belizean geology consists largely of varieties of limestone, with the notable exception of the Maya Mountains, a large uplifted block of intrusive Paleozoic granite and sediments running northeast to southwest across the south-central part of the country. Several major faults rive these highlands, but much of Belize lies outside the tectonically active zone that underlies most of Central America. During the Cretaceous Period, what is now the western part of the Maya Mountains stood above sea level, creating the oldest land surface in Central America, the Mountain Pine Ridge plateau.

The hilly regions surrounding the Maya Mountains are formed from Cretaceous limestone. These areas are characterized by a karst topography that is typified by numerous sinkholes, caverns, and underground streams. In contrast to the Mountain Pine Ridge, some of the soils in these regions are quite fertile and have been cultivated during at least the past 4,000 years.

Much of the northern half of Belize lies on the Yucatán Platform, a tectonically stable region. Although mostly level, this part of the country also has occasional areas of hilly, karst terrain, such as the Yalbac Hills along the western border with Guatemala and the Manatee Hills between Belize City and Dangriga. Alluvial deposits of varying fertility cover the relatively flat landscapes of the coastal plains.

== Environmental issues ==
Environmental degradation issues in Belize include deforestation, water pollution from sewage, industrial effluents, agricultural runoff, and solid waste disposal.

Belize is party to the Basel Convention, Convention on Biological Diversity, Ramsar Convention, CITES, Convention on the Prevention of Marine Pollution by Dumping of Wastes and Other Matter, International Convention for the Regulation of Whaling, Montreal Protocol, MARPOL 73/78, United Nations Convention on the Law of the Sea, United Nations Convention to Combat Desertification, and United Nations Framework Convention on Climate Change.

=== Climate change ===
Belize is highly vulnerable to climate change due to its low-lying coastal areas, diverse ecosystems, and economic reliance on tourism and agriculture. Rising sea levels and coastal erosion threaten coastal communities and coral reefs. Warming ocean temperatures are causing coral bleaching, which impacts biodiversity and fisheries. Extreme weather events, such as hurricanes and floods, have become more frequent and intense, damaging infrastructure and livelihoods.

As a country, Belize's 2023 greenhouse gas emissions are relatively low (7.46 million tonnes), however, it ranks as the 13th highest country for per capita emissions, at 18.13 tonnes per person. Land use change and forestry together is the highest source of emissions in Belize. The government has committed to net zero emissions by 2050 and has developed climate resilience and adaptation plans.

== Natural resources ==
Although a number of economically important minerals exist in Belize, none has been found in quantities large enough to warrant their mining. Those minerals include dolomite, barite (source of barium), bauxite (source of aluminum), cassiterite (source of tin), and gold. In 1990 limestone, used in road building, was the only mineral resource being exploited for either domestic or export use.

The similarity of Belizean geology to that of oil-producing areas of Mexico and Guatemala prompted oil companies, principally from the United States, to explore for petroleum at both offshore and on-land sites in the early 1980s. Initial results were promising, but the pace of exploration slowed later in the decade, and production operations never commenced. As a result, Belize remains almost totally dependent on imported petroleum for its energy needs.

Belize has considerable potential for hydroelectric and other renewable energy resources, such as solar and biomass. In the mid-1980s a Belizean businessman proposed the construction of a wood-burning power station for the production of electricity, but the idea foundered in the wake of ecological concerns and economic constraints. In late 2005, a company named Belize Natural Energy found oil in commercial quantities in the Spanish Lookout area of Belize.

== Extreme points ==
- Northernmost point – Subteniente Lopez
- Southernmost point – Southwestern border with Guatemala, near Chocon
- Westernmost point – Border with Guatemala, at Sarstoon River
- Easternmost point – Lighthouse Reef
- Highest point – Doyle's Delight: 1124 m
- Lowest point – Atlantic Ocean: 0 m

== See also ==
- Great Blue Hole
