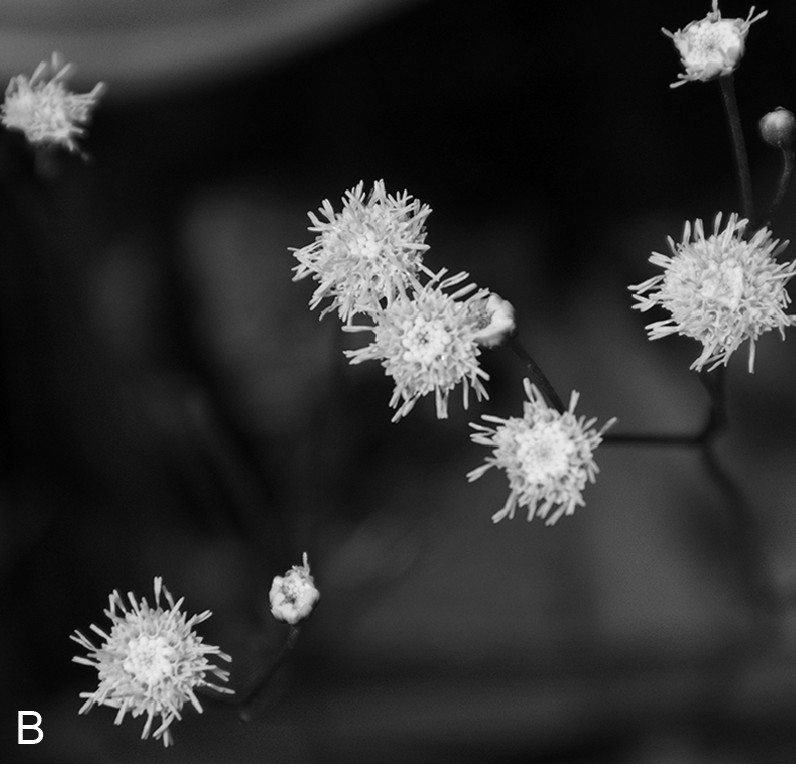
- Zyzyura mayana - capitula on erect flowering branches of living plant showing denser floral material near centers of capitula (Brewer & Pau 3349)

Scientific classification
- Kingdom: Plantae
- Clade: Tracheophytes
- Clade: Angiosperms
- Clade: Eudicots
- Clade: Asterids
- Order: Asterales
- Family: Asteraceae
- Subfamily: Asteroideae
- Tribe: Eupatorieae
- Genus: Zyzyura; H.Rob. & Pruski
- Species: Z. mayana

Binomial name
- Zyzyura mayana (Pruski) H.Rob. & Pruski

Synonyms
- Fleischmannia mayana Pruski (type species)

= Zyzyura =

Genus of flowering plants

Zyzyura is a genus of flowering plants in the tribe Eupatorieae within the family Asteraceae.

There is only one known species, Zyzyura mayana, native to Victoria Peak in Belize.
