= Vaca Forest Reserve =

Nature reserve in Belize

Coordinates: 16.94°N 89.12°W

Vaca Forest Reserve is a nature reserve in the Cayo District of western Belize. The reserve covers an area of 35,701 acres (14,448 ha). It is bordered to the west by Guatemala, to the east by Mountain Pine Ridge Forest Reserve and Nojkaaxmeen Elijio Panti National Park, and to the south by Chiquibul National Park. It forms part of the greater Maya Mountains massif.

Vaca Forest Reserve was established in 1991 and originally consisted of an estimated 52,000 acres (21,000 ha). In 2003, over 11,500 acres (4,700 ha) were removed from the reserve by the Government of Belize to provide more land to farmers from the buffering communities. In 2011, an additional 4,673 acres (1,891 ha) were removed. In recent years, the reserve has been seriously degraded by agricultural encroachment, illegal logging, and forest fires.
