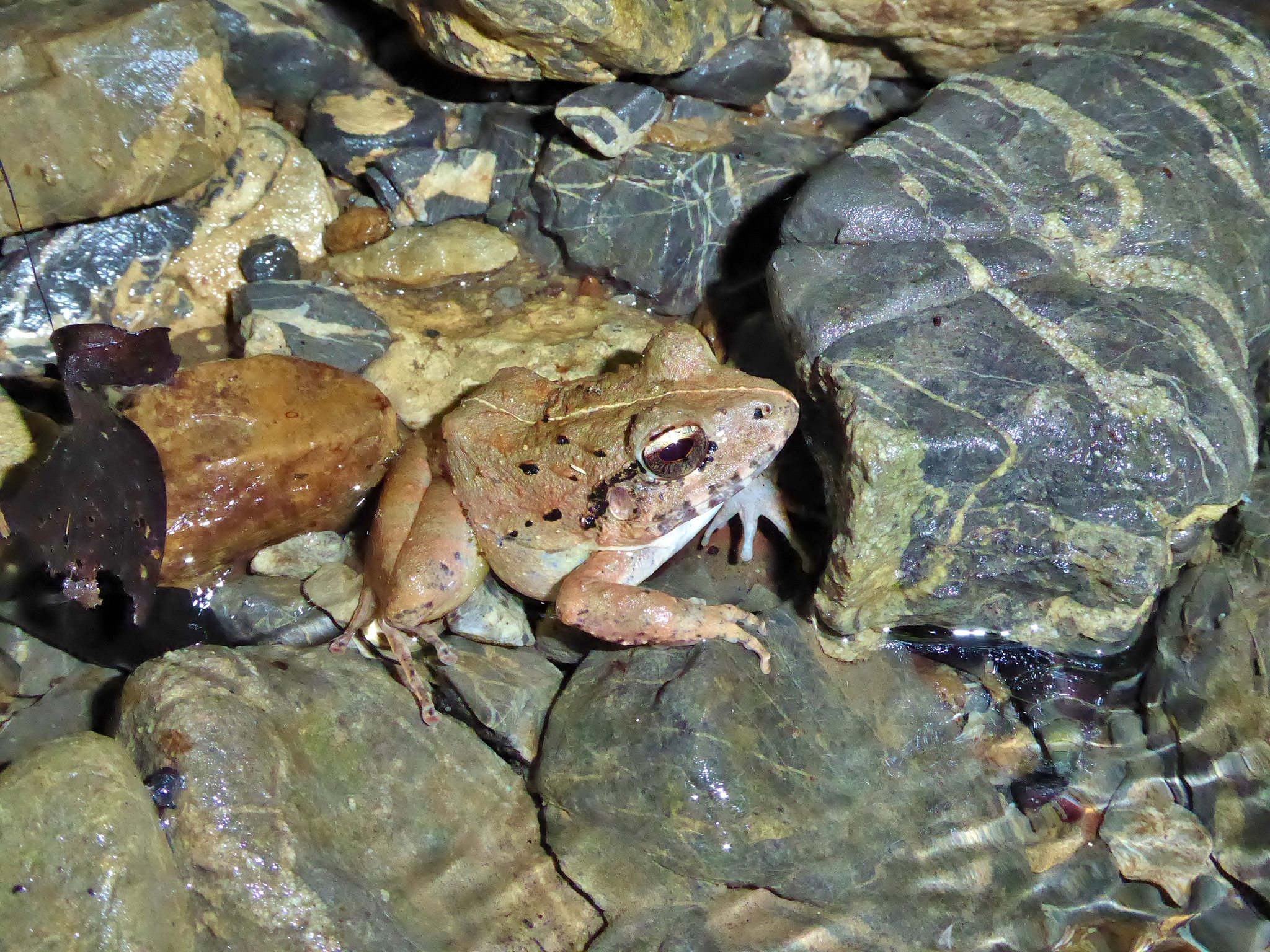

Conservation status
- Endangered (IUCN 3.1)

Scientific classification
- Kingdom: Animalia
- Phylum: Chordata
- Class: Amphibia
- Order: Anura
- Clade: Brachycephaloidea
- Family: Craugastoridae
- Genus: Craugastor
- Species: C. sandersoni

Binomial name
- Craugastor sandersoni (Schmidt, 1941)

Synonyms
- Eleutherodactylus sandersoni Schmidt, 1941

= Craugastor sandersoni =

Species of frog

Craugastor sandersoni is a species of frog in the family Craugastoridae. It is found in Belize and eastern Guatemala, in the Maya Mountains, Sierra de Santa Cruz, Sierra del Mico and the eastern part of the Sierra de las Minas. Its natural habitats are subtropical or tropical moist lowland forests and wetlands, from sea level to 1,160 m asl. It is threatened by habitat loss.
