= Victoria Peak (Belize) =

Mountain in Belize

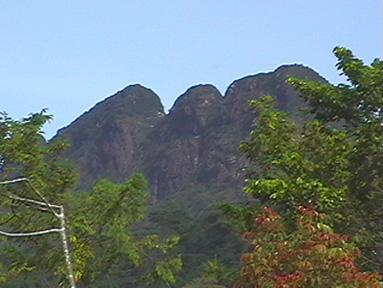
- Victoria Peak view from Hopkins Bay, Stann Creek

Highest point
- Elevation: 1,120 m (3,670 ft)
- Prominence: 530 m (1,740 ft)
- Coordinates: 16°48′44″N 88°37′13″W

Geography
- Location within Belize
- Location: Belize
- Parent range: Maya Mountains

Victoria Peak within the Maya Mountains is the second highest mountain in Belize, at a height of 1,120 metres (3,675 ft). The highest peak in the country, Doyle's Delight, at a height of 1,124 metres (3,688 ft), is located 57 kilometres (35 mi) southwest of Victoria Peak. Victoria Peak is situated in the Stann Creek District of Belize, in the Cockscomb Basin Wildlife Sanctuary, and is home to many flora and fauna common to Belize. It was pronounced a natural monument in 1998, comprising about 4,847 acres bordered by the Sittee River Wildlife Reserve, Cockscomb Basin Wildlife Sanctuary, and Chiquibul National Park.

== Ecology and climate ==
Victoria Peak is situated in a broad-leaved montane elfin forest. The tropical evergreen jungle has been damaged by hurricanes such as Hurricane Hattie in 1961, and fires caused by occasional lightning. These environmental factors have caused the ecosystem to become stunted. Along with averages of 100 inches of rainfall per year, Victoria peak is often windswept and cloud covered and the soil is poor as the various surrounding vegetation takes up all of the nutrients. The mountain is found covered with non-calcareous rock, along with the growth of many different plant species.

== Flora ==
Many of the plants that thrive in this diverse forest are used for medicinal practices, food, or even as guides and trail markers ensuring the Maya hunters do not become lost in the forest. The vegetation begins at the base of the mountain with moist, tropical forest, transforming into elfin shrubland, characterized by sphagnum moss and a tree canopy of about 2–3m (6–10 ft) high. Just ahead of the summit is a rich, humid forest that is dense with secondary growth among mature tree stands, yet with a relatively clear forest floor. The base of the mountain is compiled of sedge marsh that eventually turns to orange groves as the elevation increases slightly. The many species of trees inhabiting the peak include mahogany, cedar, banak, waika, swivelstick, quamwood, yemeri, negrito, santa maria, rosewood and many more.

Frequent species of plants that are characteristic to Victoria Peak and the Cockscomb range are Clusia sp. and Myrica cerifera, two plants species which form thick stands that average about 1–2 m (3–6 ft) tall. Shrubs such as these are very often accompanied by “beard lichen” growing amongst the branches. Bromeliads and orchids are also numerous, such as the orange flowering orchid, Epidendrum ibaguense or the scarlet orchid, also known as dragon's tongue. Epidendrum ibaguense, or the fiery-coloured orchid, is a rare species of orchid that only grows at higher elevations. One of the other more common plant species seen is the hot lips bush, it is most frequently spotted along the trail edges and is characterized by its ‘pouting’ red flower.

Victorian Peak is classified as High Altitude Elfin Forest. With specific areas within this vegetation class containing abundant Clusia cf. massoniana., rare stands of Colpothrinax Cookii palms, and areas of cloud forest where abundant amounts of Sphagnum sp. covered boulders are found in the dips on the main Victoria Peak ridge. Of note, but slightly lower down from the ridge, unusual and large specimens of Cibotium regale can be found on the granite substrate.

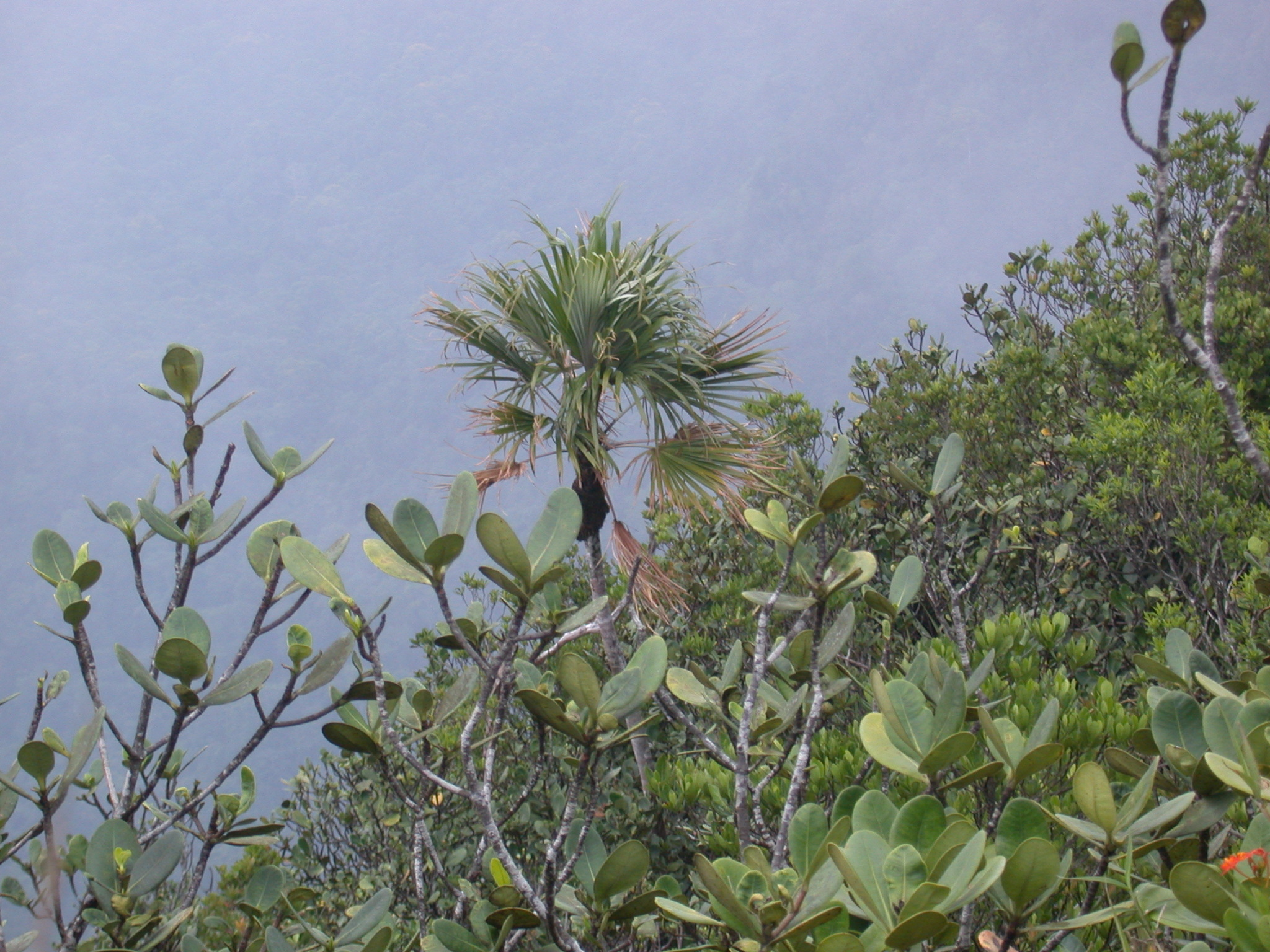
Clusia spp and Colpothrinax cookii

== Fauna ==
Avians

As many as 300 species of birds can be spotted in the Cockscomb Basin itself. There are many native species that reside in the Belizean forests on Victoria Peak, as well as seasonal migrants that average about 18% of the bird population. Of those, there are critically endangered species present such as the ornate hawk-eagle, keel-billed motmot, and the scarlet macaw.

Other common birds of Victoria Peak and the Cockscomb Basin include: great curassow, crested guan, clay-coloured robins, social flycatchers, collared seedeaters, crimson-collared tanagers and masked tanagers, bat falcons, Montezuma oropendola, as well as white-collared manakins, pauraque, the slaty-breasted tinamou, chestnut headed oropendolas, parrots, toucans, and Agami heron to name a few.

Mammals

Cockscomb Wildlife Sanctuary in the Victoria Peak region hosts the world’s densest jaguar population. Panthera onca (jaguar) is the third largest member of the cat family in the world and is considered endangered in the majority of its habitat ranges. Other common mammals of the Victoria Peak region that are thriving in the protected area and Cockscomb Sanctuary are: jaguarundi, ocelot, puma, margay, peccary, paca, as well as brocket deer, nine-banded armadillo, tayra, otter, coatimundi, gibnut, and agouti.

Some of the animals listed on the IUCN Red List of seriously endangered mammals that inhabit Victoria Peak and area are the ocelot, margay, jaguarundi, puma as well as Baird's tapir, all of which have populations beginning to increase in size.

Other

There are many reptiles, amphibians and insects that frequent the broad-leaved montane elfin forest. Recently, Smilisca cyanostica (formerly S phaeota), a species of frog, along with Gastrophryne elegans, a toad that had not previously been seen in Belize, has also been observed on the peak. A week-long diversity survey recorded 44 species of butterfly in the area.

The forest carpet is often covered in leaf-cutter ants that create long travelling routes, while tarantulas often remain hidden under leaves at trail edges. Botflies are also present, due to the presence of cattle ranchers further north that settle throughout Belize, and infect mosquitoes with their eggs to then be transferred to a bovine host and to hatch into larvae right underneath the epidermal layer.

== History ==
Victoria was thought to be the highest mountain in Belize at 1,120 m (3,670 ft), until very recently when Doyle’s Delight was measured at 1,124 m (3,688 ft). The first exploration of Victoria Peak occurred in British expeditions of 1888 and 1889, but the explorers actually scaled a nearby peak that they mistakenly labeled Victoria Peak. Several expeditions followed in 1927-1928. The name “Victoria Peak” was given in honor of Queen Victoria for the highest peak in the Cockscomb Basin Wildlife Sanctuary Range. On May 2, 1998, Victoria Peak was declared a natural monument, adding it to the list of protected areas in Belize.

Rowan Garel, a 12-year-old visually impaired boy, climbed to the top of Victoria Peak along with his father in 2011. His efforts, with assistance from Delta Air Lines and his father, raised money for a summer camp put on by the Belize Council for the Visually Impaired.

== Tourism ==
There is a Victoria Peak Trail in Cockscomb Basin Wildlife Sanctuary that is open during the dry season in Belize from February–June. The hike takes approximately 3–4 days and is 29 km (18 mi) one way. Groups are limited to a maximum of 8 and licensed tour guides that are found in the local communities are required to accompany hikers on the trail. There are two campsites, one at 12 km (7.5 mi) and a second at 19 km (12 mi), where hikers often stay overnight. The majority of the hiking is class 3 (scrambling and a rope may be required), however, there are certain areas with class 4 hiking where a rope is required. There are areas of up and down grades ranging from 20-60 degrees, making the hiking strenuous.
