= Cockscomb Basin Wildlife Sanctuary =

Nature reserve in Belize

- IUCN category IV (habitat/species management area)
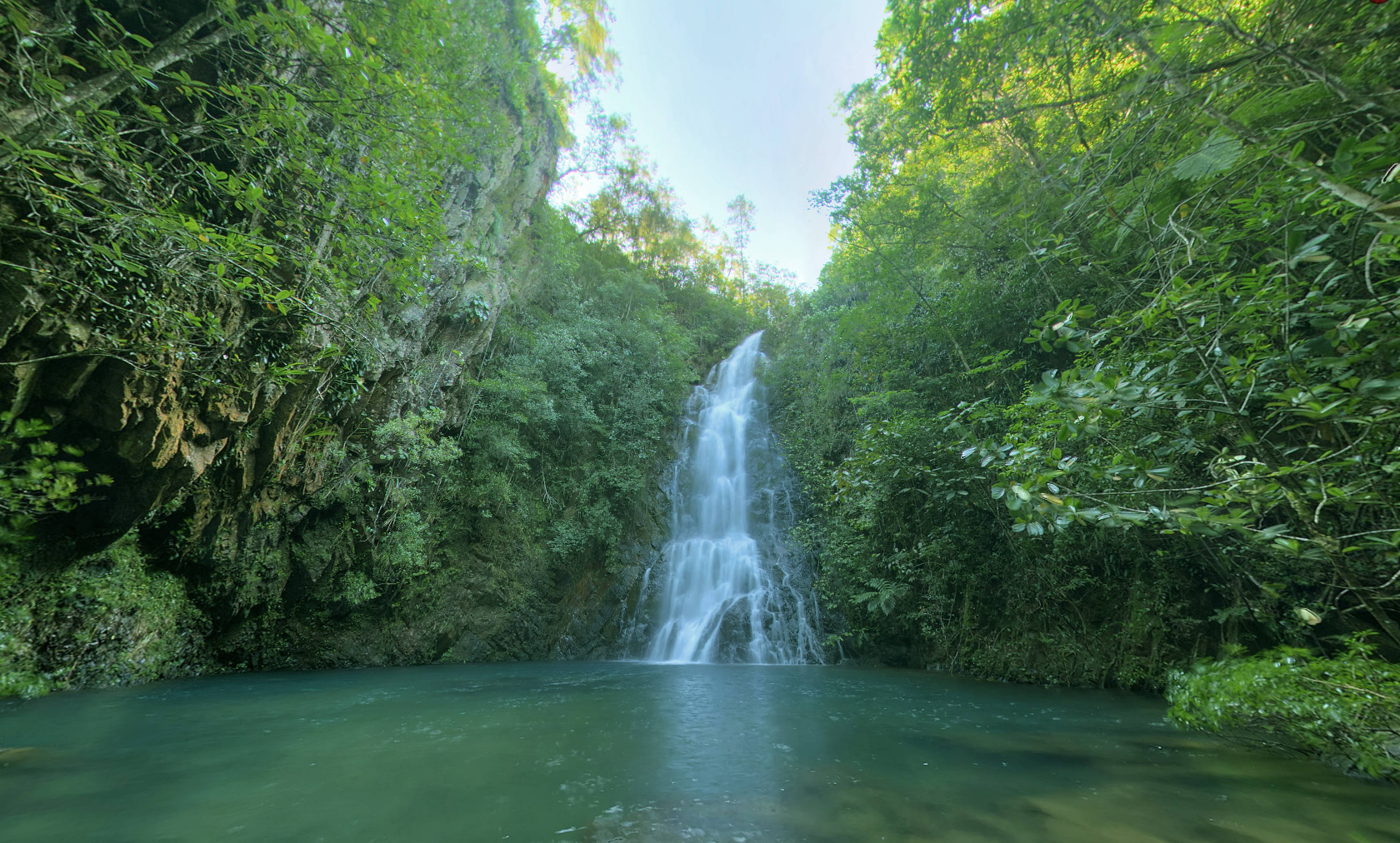
- Waterfall in a tributary of South Stann Creek in Cockscomb Basin Wildlife Sanctuary

- Location within Belize
- Coordinates: 16.7162°N 88.6608°W
- Area: 353.36 km^{2} (136.43 sq mi)
- Designation: Wildlife sanctuary
- Designated: 1984
- Operator: Belize Forest Department/Belize Audubon Society

The Cockscomb Basin Wildlife Sanctuary is a nature reserve in the Stann Creek District of south-central Belize. It was established to protect the forests, fauna and watersheds of an approximately 400 square kilometres (150 sq mi) area of the eastern slopes of the Maya Mountains.

The reserve was established in 1986 as the first protected area for protection of the jaguar (Panthera onca). It is regarded as a premier site for jaguar preservation in the world.

The name 'Cockscomb' derives from the appearance of the Cockscomb Mountain ridge, that resembles a rooster's comb, which is situated at the northern fringe of the reserve and which is easily visible from the coastal plain of the Caribbean Sea. Habitation by the ancient Mayas occurred in the Cockscomb Basin as early as 10,000 BCE. However, the first modern exploration in the recorded history of the basin did not occur until 1888.

== Geography ==
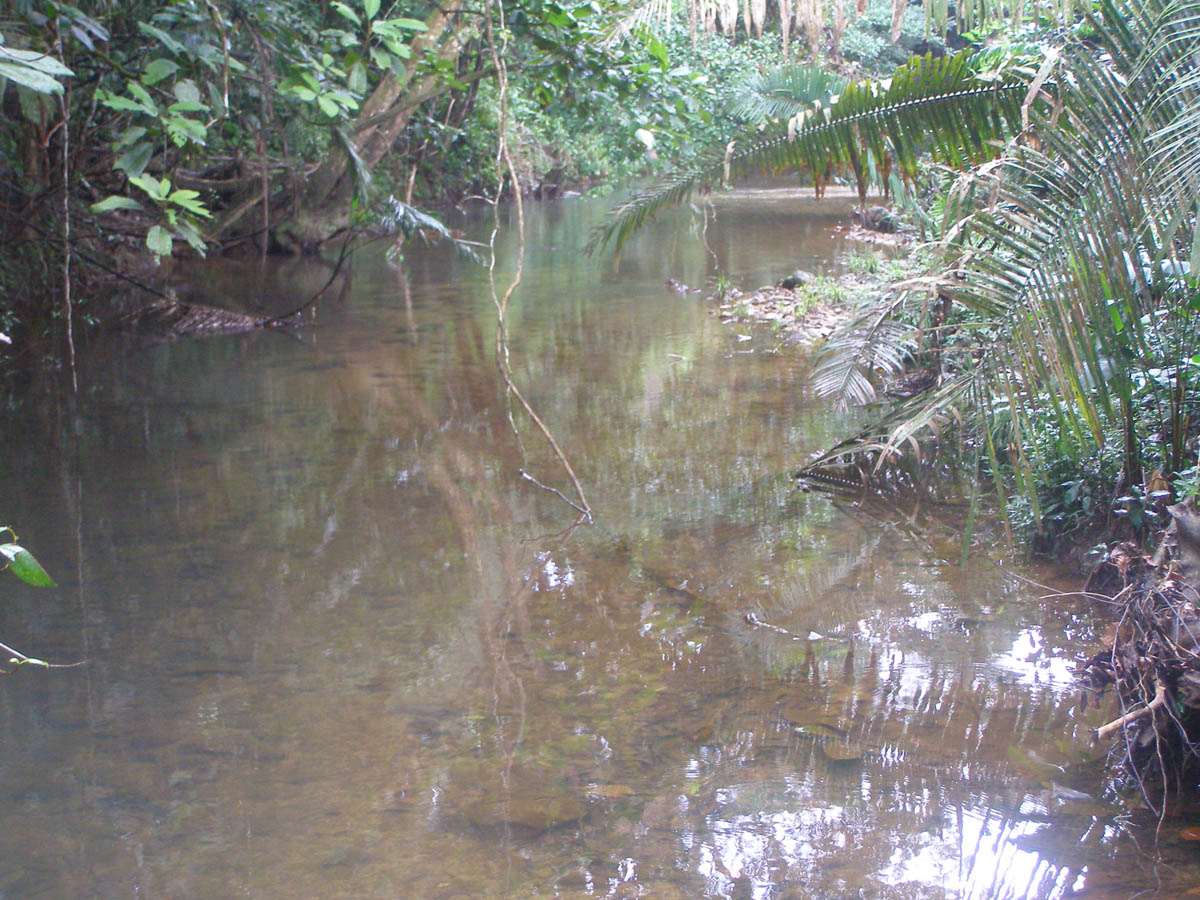
South Stann Creek, in the Cockscomb West Basin section

The Cockscomb Basin Wildlife Sanctuary is actually comprised by two adjacent geographic basins. The West Basin is drained by the Swasey Branch, which is one of the main tributaries to the Monkey River. The East Basin consists of the upper watershed of South Stann Creek. The West Basin, being more difficult to access given distance from trailheads and higher forest density, is as of the current time still relatively unexplored from the standpoint of species mapping, Mayan ruins and other environmental details.

The reserve is generally lozenge-shaped, spanning an east–west dimension of approximately 36 km (22 mi) and a north–south dimension of approximately 14 km (9 mi). Elevation extremes are 50 m (160 ft) above sea level in the lower reaches of South Stann Creek to 1,160 m (3,810 ft) atop Victoria Peak.

The West Basin is bounded by the ridge of the Maya Mountains on the west, Cockscomb Mountains on the north, a prominent transverse ridge of the Maya Mountains at the south (of about elevation 1,000 m (3,300 ft)) and a low-lying north–south ridge at the east, which separates the West from East Basin. The Swasey Branch exits through the south transverse range via a deep 300 m (980 ft) gorge. The East Basin is also bounded on the north by the namesake Cockscomb ridge, to the west by the low-lying north–south ridge separating the two basins, to the east by Cabbage Haul Ridge and to the south by Stann Creek Ridge. South Stann Creek flows out of the East Basin on the south in a meandering gentle gradient that was easily navigated by the British explorers in the 1880s.

The site consists of two distinct adjacent watersheds and is accessible via a low-intensity trail system to accommodate visitors and research environmental scientists.

== Natural history ==
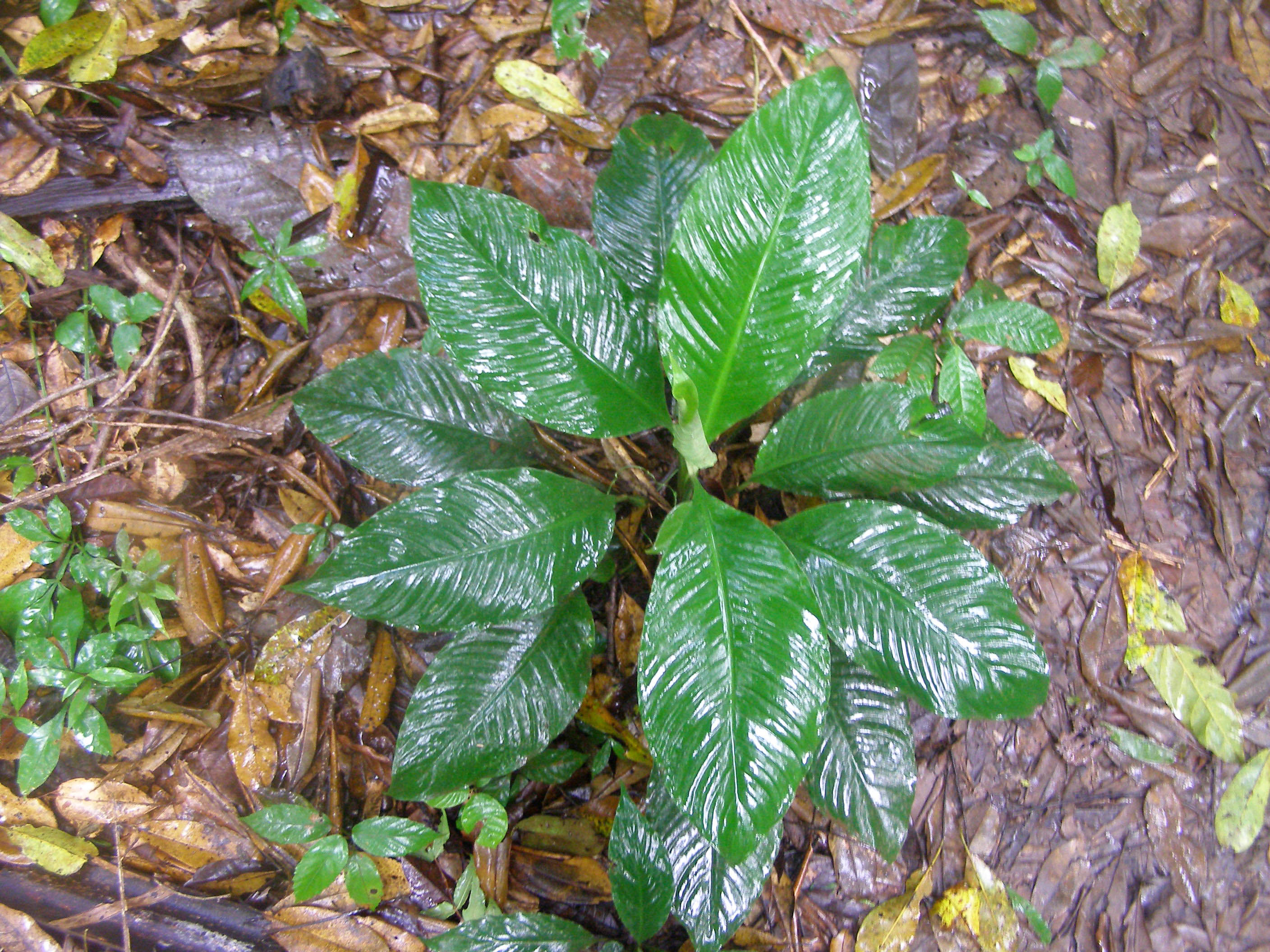
Plant on the forest floor of the Cockscomb West Basin section

The Maya Mountains and foothills are among the oldest surface rock formations of Central America; these Paleozoic sediments were uplifted about 200 million years ago in the later part (Pennsylvanian) of the Carboniferous period and the Early Permian period. The principal uplifted rock formations in the Sanctuary are quartzite and sandstone.

=== Flora ===
Principal plant communities and habitats are Belizean pine forests, elfin scrub, Petén–Veracruz moist forests, sheltered valley forests, and floodplain thickets.

The principal forest type is tropical moist broadleaf forest, which covers moderate to steep slopes, and in some cases sheltered mountain valleys. While much of this forest is secondary due to Mayan era farming as well as modern logging, some of the steeper reaches exhibit primary forest characteristics. Dominant trees in this forest type are mahogany (Swietenia macrophylla) and cedar (Cedrela odorata), which were prized and hence heavily logged from the early 1900s to late in the 20th century.

=== Water ===
Fast flowing clear mountain streams flow to the valley floors of the two basins to yield a more turbid water quality, especially during periods of peak rain. This site is known worldwide as the premier habitat for the jaguar (Panthera onca), which is most often found in the vast almost unexplored West Basin wilderness.

The riparian zone forest areas generally feature lush broadleaf rainforest intruding into the verges of fast flowing steep mountain streams as well as the languid meandering valley drainages. There are particularly interesting assemblages of vegetation along the rocky bedded mountain streams which have frequent rapids, waterfalls and deep pools. Due to the density of vegetation and frequent precipitation events, the forest floor often appears fresh and verdant even after several rainless days.

== History ==
=== Mayan ===
Throughout much of the foothills of the eastern slopes in southern Belize, there is evidence of Mayan habitation since at least 10,000 BCE. The Pearce Ruin was the first Mayan site to have been catalogued in modern history archives in a report to the British Museum in 1931; however, the ruin was not re-sighted until 1995 with the Dunham surveys. At that late date two other Mayan sites were documented: Hun' Tul Mo' (one macaw) and Xa'a Yul Ha' (many rivers).

=== 19th century ===
The first modern explorations that led to recorded features of the Cockscomb Basin were conducted by the British in expeditions of 1888 and 1889. These adventures began with river excursions up the South Stann Creek and resulted in attainment of what these explorers thought to be Victoria Peak, the highest point in Belize; in fact, later reconstructions showed that the mounting of a nearby peak to Victoria had been scaled.

=== 20th century ===
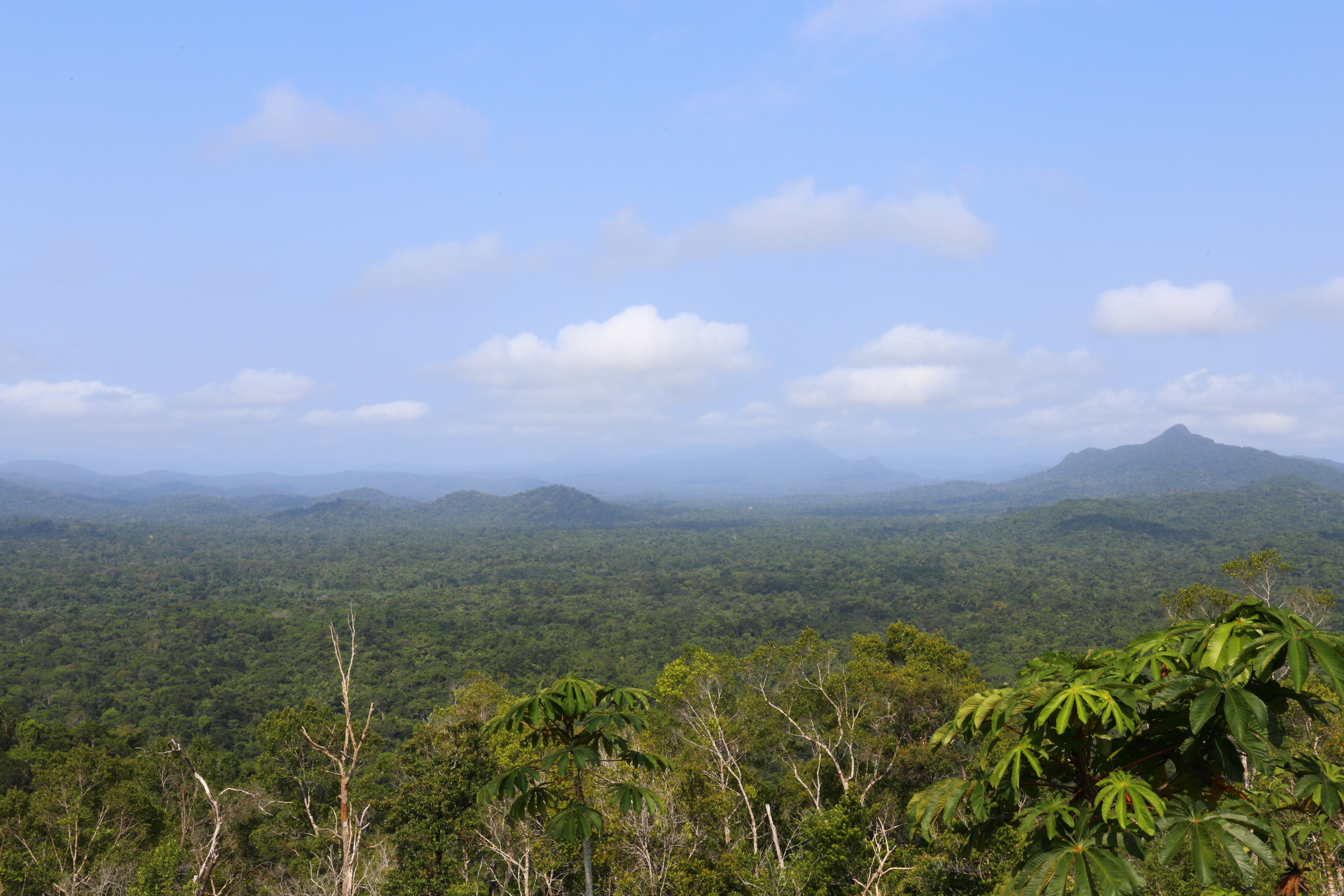
View of Cockscomb Basin

Further exploration of the Cockscomb Basin did not transpire until 1927, when further British expeditions were launched to assess timber reserves; subsequently, logging began to occur until the year 1984, primarily with extraction of cedar (Cedrela odorata) and mahogany (Swietenia macrophylla). At about the same time as exploitation of these resources was virtually complete, a nationwide study of the jaguar was initiated. This scientific investigation led by Alan Rabinowitz, a recent recipient of the PhD degree from the University of Tennessee, found that the Cockscomb Basin was a particularly important habitat for the jaguar, not only in Belize, but from a Central America perspective.

In 1986, Rabinowitz and Archie Carr III convinced the government of Belize to establish a no hunting zone with respect to jaguars in a portion of the Cockscomb Basin. By 1990, after further convincing, the Belize government expanded the Sanctuary substantially, and in 1995 another 160 km^{2} were added to connect the holding to the Bladen Branch Nature Reserve.

In 1988, the IUCN declared the Cockscomb Basin Wildlife Sanctuary "The major achievement in cat conservation for the triennium". In that year, Prince Philip as president of World Wide Fund for Nature—WWF, honoured Ignacio Pop for his work in encouraging creation of the reserve. In 1998, the Victoria Peak National Monument area was established embracing 19.59 km^{2} of protected land.

== See also ==
- List of protected areas of Belize
- North American jaguar
