= Chiquibul National Park =

National park in Belize

- IUCN category II (national park)
- Location within Belize
- Location: Cayo District
- Nearest city: Belmopan
- Coordinates: 16°42′37″N 88°56′15″W
- Area: 1,073 km^{2} (414 sq mi)
- Established: 1995
- Website: www.pactbelize.org

Chiquibul National Park is Belize's largest national park. It is 1,073 km^{2} (414 sq mi) in size. The park is located in Belize's Cayo District. The national park surrounds Caracol, a Mayan city. Caracol has been designated as an archaeological reserve and is not included within the park's total area. Chiquibul Forest Reserve is adjacent to the park.

== Establishment of the park ==
Chiquibul National Park was originally part of Chiquibul Forest Reserve, which was designated in 1956. In 1991, due to lobbying from conservationists, the three-quarters of the forest reserve that did not have active logging concessions was re-designated as a national park under Belize's National Parks System Act. The park's borders were re-defined in 1995. Caracol became surrounded by the national park.

== Geology and geography ==
The western side of the park lies along Belize's border with Guatemala. The park lies west of the Maya Mountains. The park's landscape includes south Vaca Plateau and eastern slopes of the Maya Mountains. Doyle's Delight, the highest mountain in Belize, is located in the park. The park is located on a layer of limestone strata, the largest area of protected karst in Belize. The park incorporates portions of the Chiquibul Cave System, the longest known cave system in Central America. The cave system is made up of caves linked by water flows, including the Chiquibul River. The Chiquibul River flows through Belize, goes underground into the cave system, and resurfaces in Guatemala. The cave system includes the largest known underground passages and cave chamber discovered in the Western Hemisphere.

== Flora and fauna ==
The forest has been mostly unbroken since the Maya left it centuries ago. The park has high biodiversity. Species found in the park include keel-billed motmots, kinkajous, jaguars, jaguarundis, king vultures, margays, ocelots, ocellated turkeys, Yucatan spider monkeys, and Baird's tapirs. It has Belize's largest breeding population of scarlet macaws. New insect and crustacean species have been discovered in the park. The biological diversity of the park has not yet been fully explored. In 1993, a botanist from Missouri Botanical Garden collected more than 130 plant species previously unreported in Belize. Three of these species had never before been reported in Central America.
