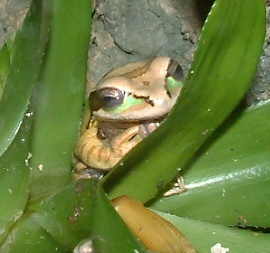

Conservation status
- Least Concern (IUCN 3.1)

Scientific classification
- Kingdom: Animalia
- Phylum: Chordata
- Class: Amphibia
- Order: Anura
- Family: Hylidae
- Genus: Smilisca
- Species: S. cyanosticta

Binomial name
- Smilisca cyanosticta (Smith, 1953)

Synonyms
- Hyla phaeota cyanosticta Smith, 1953; Smilisca phaeota cyanosticta (Smith, 1953)

= Blue-spotted Mexican tree frog =

Species of amphibian

The blue-spotted Mexican tree frog (Smilisca cyanosticta) is a species of frog in the family Hylidae found on the Atlantic slopes of southeastern Mexico, Belize, and Guatemala, between Jalapa de Díaz in Mexico and Sierra del Mico in Guatemala. Its natural habitats are humid mid-altitude and montane forests, and it can also occur in secondary forest. Breeding takes place in temporary pools and streams and in depressions in logs that fill up with water. It is threatened by habitat loss and, potentially, chytridiomycosis.
