= Doyle's Delight =

Highest mountain in Belize

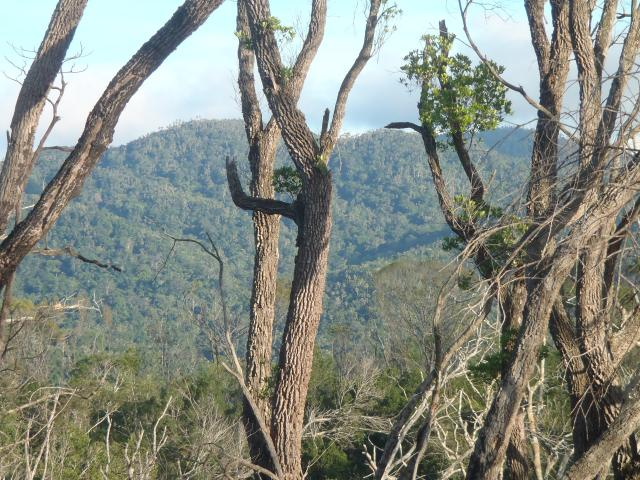
- Doyle's Delight in 2014

Highest point
- Elevation: 1,124 m (3,688 ft)
- Prominence: 936 m (3,071 ft)
- Listing: Country high point
- Coordinates: 16°29′39″N 89°02′45″W

Geography
- Location within Belize
- Location: Belize
- Parent range: Maya Mountains

Doyle's Delight is the highest peak in Belize at 1,124 m (3,688 ft). It lies on the Maya Divide, the main ridge line of the Maya Mountains in southwestern Belize.

The name Doyle's Delight was coined by Sharon Matola in a 1989 report. The name is based on Sir Arthur Conan Doyle's book The Lost World (1912), which contains the quote "there must be something wild and wonderful in a country such as this, and we're the men to find it out!"

This name has meanwhile achieved widespread acceptance. The official Government of Belize website lists Doyle's Delight as the highest point in Belize. The capital of Belize, Belmopan, has a "Doyle's Delight Street". Recently there has been an attempt to rename the peak to "Kaan Witz" which is Maya for "Sky Mountain", but the new name has not gained widespread acceptance.

Although Victoria Peak was for many years touted as the highest point in Belize, recent assessments determined that it is apparently slightly lower at 1,120 metres (3,675 ft). Victoria Peak is located east of the Maya Mountain Divide in the Stann Creek District, and in clear weather its dramatic peak is visible from the coast. Doyle's Delight is located in the heart of the Maya Mountains and is part of a more gently sloping range, with no dramatic peak.

== Expeditions ==
There is a clearing on the peak that is maintained by the Belize Defence Force and the British Armed Forces as a helicopter landing. In 1970, a survey marker was placed at the high point of the ridge.

In 2004 and 2007 ecologists reached the summit by using a helicopter and surveyed Doyle's Delight and adjacent ridges to better understand the ecology and biodiversity of the region. These efforts focused on plants, fungi, insects, amphibians, birds, and small mammals, and produced preliminary inventory data for the area.
