= Big Rock =

Big Rock may refer to:

== Belize ==
- Big Rock Falls, a waterfall

== Canada ==
- Big Rock (glacial erratic), a glacial erratic situated just southwest of Okotoks, Alberta
- Big Rock Brewery, a beer brewery located in Calgary, Alberta

== New Zealand ==
- Big Rock (Canterbury), a rock formation near Mount Herbert
- Big Rock (Otago), a bluff near Brighton
- Big Rock (West Coast), a sea stack near Rapahoe
- Big Rock (Stewart Island), an island in Halfmoon Bay
- Big Rock Beach, north of the mouth of the Kōhaihai River, West Coast Region
- Big Rock Stream, an inflow to Lake Pukaki, Canterbury
- The Big Rock (Otago), a rock formation near Middlemarch

== United States ==
=== Populated places ===
- Big Rock, Illinois, a village
  - Big Rock Township, Kane County, Illinois
- Big Rock, Ohio, an unincorporated community
- Big Rock, Tennessee, an unincorporated community
- Big Rock, Texas, an unincorporated community
- Big Rock, Virginia, an unincorporated community

=== Geographic locations ===
- Big Rock, a rock pillar in Glacier County, Montana
- Big Rock, a mountain in Silver Bow County, Montana
- Big Rock (ski resort), a resort in Mars Hill, Maine
- Big Rock Creek (Minnesota), a stream in Minnesota
- Big Rock Creek (Missouri), a stream in Missouri
- Big Rock Point Nuclear Power Plant, a former nuclear power plant in Charlevoix, Michigan
- Glen Rock (boulder), also referred to historically as "Big Rock"
- Big Rock Interchange, a highway interchange in Little Rock, Arkansas
- Big Rock Nature Preserve, a park in Charlotte, North Carolina
- Big Rock Ranch, a corporate resort in California built by Lucasfilm
- The Big Rock Formation in New Mexico
