= Big Rock Creek =

Big Rock Creek may refer to:

- Big Rock Creek (Minnesota), a stream in Beltrami and Clearwater counties, Minnesota, United States
- Big Rock Creek (Missouri), a stream in Harrison County, Missouri, United States
- Big Rock Creek (California), a river in California, United States
