= Mars Hill (Maine) =

Mountain in Maine, United States

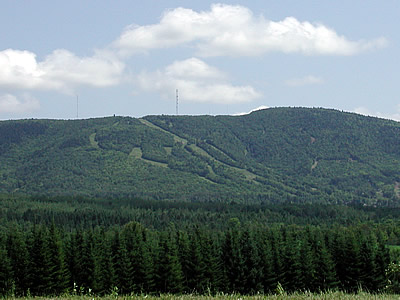

Highest point
- Elevation: 1,748 ft (533 m)
- Prominence: 1,210 ft (370 m)
- Coordinates: 46°31′16″N 67°48′49″W

Geography
- Location within Maine
- Location: Aroostook County, Maine
- Topo map: USGS Mars Hill

Mars Hill is a mountain in Mars Hill, Maine, that gave the town its name.

The mountain plays an important role in the Mars Hill community, and overlooks the Saint John Valley. Mount Katahdin is visible from the top of Mars Hill over 85 miles (135 km) away. Mars Hill also has a ski area, called Big Rock Ski Area.

By virtue of its height and Northeast location, the summit of Mars Hill is the first place in the contiguous United States to see the Sun rise for nearly half of the year, from March 25 to September 18. The first 50-star flag to see the Sun in the U.S. was raised on July 4, 1960, at 4:33 AM. Fifty national guardsmen gave it a 50-gun salute.

== Wind farm ==
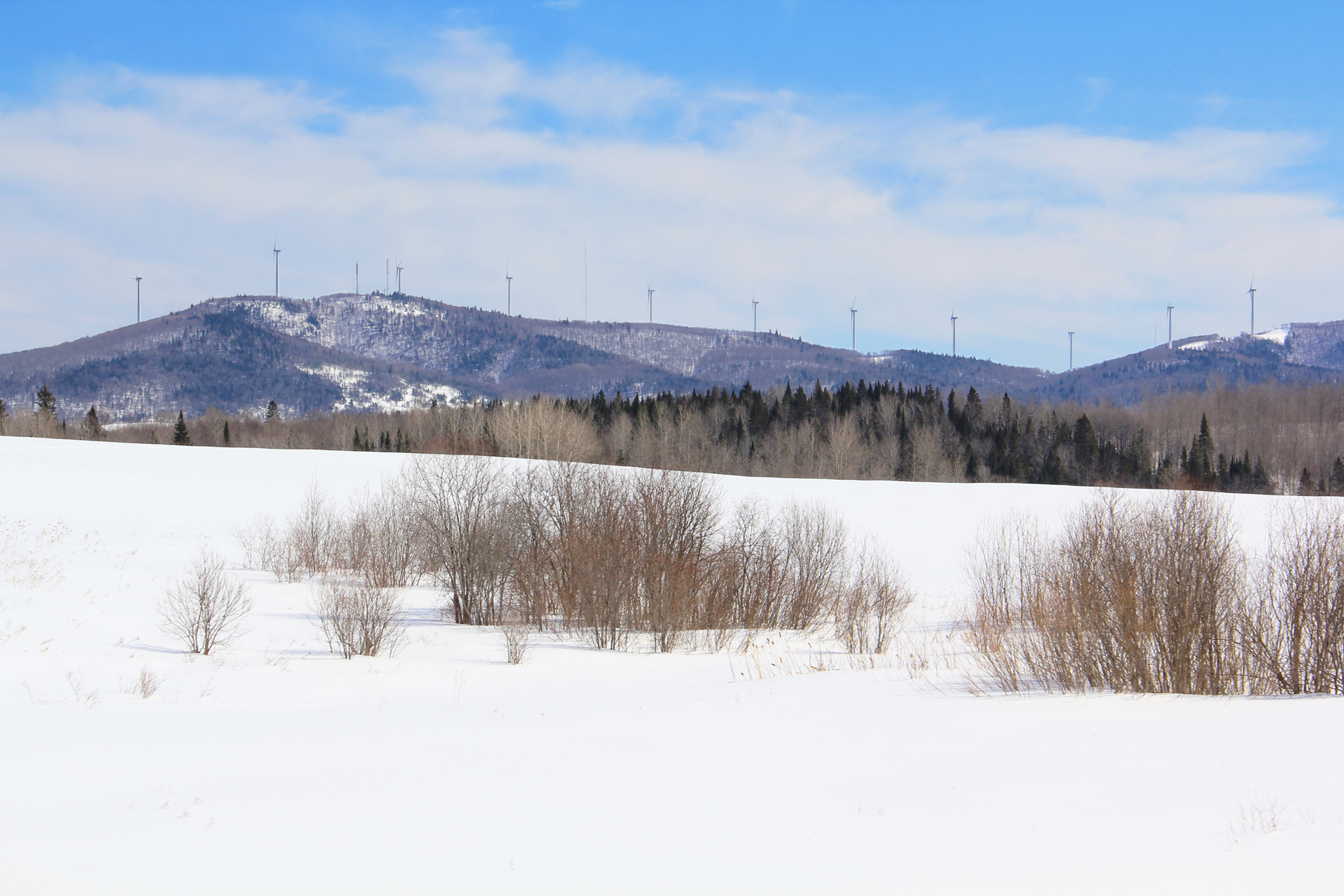
Mars Hill in late winter as seen from US Highway 1

Mars Hill underwent an $85 million wind power project in the fall of 2006. First Wind installed 28 General Electric 1.5 megawatt turbines along the top and northern sections of the mountain. With a capacity factor of 35%, the wind farm generates about 130 million kilowatt hours (kW·h) per year (15 MW·yr/yr). The wind turbines are assembled in multiple parts. The towers, which are composed of three support sections stacked one on top of another with a combined weight of 20,000 pounds, are 262 ft (80 m) tall. The three blades (together, a rotor) attached to the hub of the turbine each span approximately 115 ft (37.5 m), for a rotor diameter of approximately 250 feet — comparable to the wingspan of a Boeing 747 jet-liner.

== See also ==
- List of mountains in Maine
- Wind power in Maine
