= Mars Hill, Maine =

Town in Maine, United States

- Town
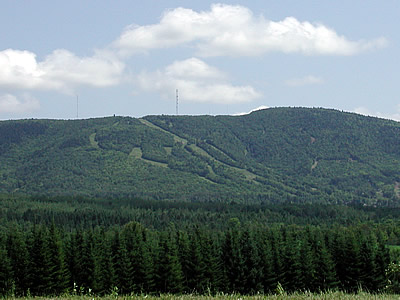
- Mars Hill mountain

- Seal

- Location of Mars Hill, Maine
- Coordinates: 46°33′15″N 67°52′17″W
- Country: United States
- State: Maine
- County: Aroostook
- Incorporated: February 21, 1867
- Village: Mars Hill

Area
  - Total: 35.20 sq mi (91.17 km^{2})
  - Land: 35.13 sq mi (90.99 km^{2})
  - Water: 0.069 sq mi (0.18 km^{2})
- Elevation: 610 ft (190 m)

Population (2020)
  - Total: 1,360
  - Density: 39/sq mi (14.9/km^{2})
- Time zone: UTC-5 (Eastern)
  - Summer (DST): UTC-4 (Eastern)
- ZIP code: 04758
- Area code: 207
- FIPS code: 23-43710
- GNIS feature ID: 582582
- Website: www.marshillmaine.org

Mars Hill is a town in Aroostook County, Maine, United States, nestled at the foot of Mars Hill Mountain. The town borders Wicklow Parish, New Brunswick, Canada. The region is mainly agricultural. The population was 1,360 at the time of the 2020 census.

== History ==
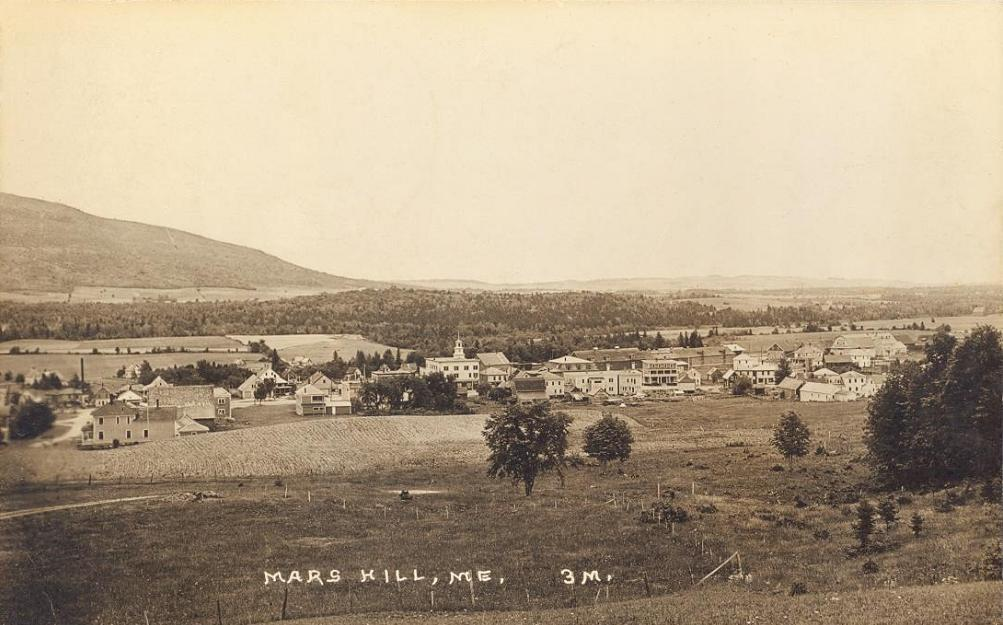
Town view c. 1915

=== Timeline of events ===
The town of Mars Hill is named for Hezekiah Mars, who camped for three years at the base of Mars Hill Mountain. In 1834, the first industry was cutting timber, particularly trees for masts. Farming later became important. Following the end of the Aroostook War in 1839, a boundary line between Maine and New Brunswick was cleared and iron markers were put in place three years later. The first mill opened at Rocky Brook in 1856. In 1860, the first school was established for the community of Mars Hill. Further development of the community was delayed until after the American Civil War. The Bangor and Aroostook Railroad arrived in 1892, allowing shipment of local produce to distant markets.

In 1906, the White Mountain Telephone Company, later known as the Aroostook Telephone & Telegraph Company, opened a new office in Mars Hill. A six-bed community hospital was established in 1912. In 1922, an intense fire devastated the business district in town. Businesses were promptly rebuilt. In 1937, the Walter T.A. Hansen Memorial Library opened. In the 1960s, Big Rock Ski Area was founded on Mars Hill Mountain.

In 2006, Maine's first wind farm was installed along the top and northern side of Mars Hill Mountain.

=== Military presence ===
During and after World War II, Mars Hill and the economies of surrounding towns were dominated by military spending. In 1947, the Limestone Army Air Field was built in Limestone. It opened in 1953 and was renamed the Loring Air Force Base. Aroostook County was chosen due to its strategic location as the closest point in the continental United States to Europe. The 1991 Base Realignment and Closure Commission recommended the closure of the Loring Air Force Base, and it closed in 1994.

=== Big Rock Ski Area ===
During the late 1950s, two hundred acres were purchased to develop a local recreation area, and by 1960 the Big Rock Ski Area was opened. Big Rock Ski Center was purchased in 2000 by the Maine Winter Sports Center (MWSC), through grants by the Libra Foundation.

=== Wind power development ===
On March 27, 2007, a wind farm project was commissioned to be constructed on Mars Hill Mountain by First Wind, a Massachusetts-based renewable energy company. The Mars Hill Wind Farm was projected to have cost $85 million. A total of 28 General Electric 1.5 megawatt turbines were installed along the ridge and in the northern section of the mountain. The wind farm generates about 130 million kilowatt hours (kW·h) per year (15 MW·yr/yr), with a capacity factor of 35%. Mars Hill Wind Farm was the first utility-scale facility in Maine, with projected capacity to produce enough electricity to power 20,000 homes. Mars Hill Wind Farm exports electricity to New Brunswick Power and has become an important component in the local economy.

== Demographics ==
Historical population
| Census | Pop. | Note | %± |
|---|---|---|---|
| 1860 | 201 | | — |
| 1870 | 399 | | 98.5% |
| 1880 | 716 | | 79.4% |
| 1890 | 837 | | 16.9% |
| 1900 | 1,183 | | 41.3% |
| 1910 | 1,511 | | 27.7% |
| 1920 | 1,783 | | 18.0% |
| 1930 | 1,837 | | 3.0% |
| 1940 | 1,886 | | 2.7% |
| 1950 | 2,060 | | 9.2% |
| 1960 | 2,062 | | 0.1% |
| 1970 | 1,875 | | −9.1% |
| 1980 | 1,892 | | 0.9% |
| 1990 | 1,760 | | −7.0% |
| 2000 | 1,480 | | −15.9% |
| 2010 | 1,493 | | 0.9% |
| 2020 | 1,360 | | −8.9% |
U.S. Decennial Census

=== 2010 census ===
As of the census of 2010, there were 1,493 people, 614 households, and 413 families residing in the town. The population density was 42.5 inhabitants per square mile (16.4/km^{2}). There were 687 housing units at an average density of 19.6 per square mile (7.6/km^{2}). The racial makeup of the town was 97.3% White, 0.2% African American, 0.7% Native American, 0.2% Asian, 0.2% from other races, and 1.3% from two or more races. Hispanic or Latino of any race were 1.0% of the population.

There were 614 households, of which 28.0% had children under the age of 18 living with them, 52.8% were married couples living together, 10.4% had a female householder with no husband present, 4.1% had a male householder with no wife present, and 32.7% were non-families. 27.9% of all households were made up of individuals, and 12.8% had someone living alone who was 65 years of age or older. The average household size was 2.33 and the average family size was 2.82.

The median age in the town was 44 years. 21% of residents were under the age of 18; 8.4% were between the ages of 18 and 24; 21.6% were from 25 to 44; 26.8% were from 45 to 64; and 22.2% were 65 years of age or older. The gender makeup of the town was 47.0% male and 53.0% female.

=== 2000 census ===
As of the census of 2000, there were 1,480 people, 614 households, and 413 families residing in the town. The population density was 42.1 inhabitants per square mile (16.3/km^{2}). There were 708 housing units at an average density of 20.2 per square mile (7.8/km^{2}). The racial makeup of the town was 97.50% White, 0.14% African American, 1.49% Native American, 0.20% Asian, 0.20% from other races, and 0.47% from two or more races. Hispanic or Latino of any race were 0.41% of the population.

There were 614 households, out of which 26.9% had children under the age of 18 living with them, 55.0% were married couples living together, 8.1% had a female householder with no husband present, and 32.6% were non-families. 30.0% of all households were made up of individuals, and 18.1% had someone living alone who was 65 years of age or older. The average household size was 2.35 and the average family size was 2.87.

In the town, the population was spread out, with 23.0% under the age of 18, 7.9% from 18 to 24, 25.1% from 25 to 44, 20.7% from 45 to 64, and 23.4% who were 65 years of age or older. The median age was 41 years. For every 100 females, there were 89.7 males. For every 100 females age 18 and over, there were 84.2 males.

The median income for a household in the town was $24,083, and the median income for a family was $33,333. Males had a median income of $27,054 versus $19,500 for females. The per capita income for the town was $13,630. About 13.4% of families and 16.6% of the population were below the poverty line, including 19.3% of those under age 18 and 19.9% of those age 65 or over.

== Geography and climate ==
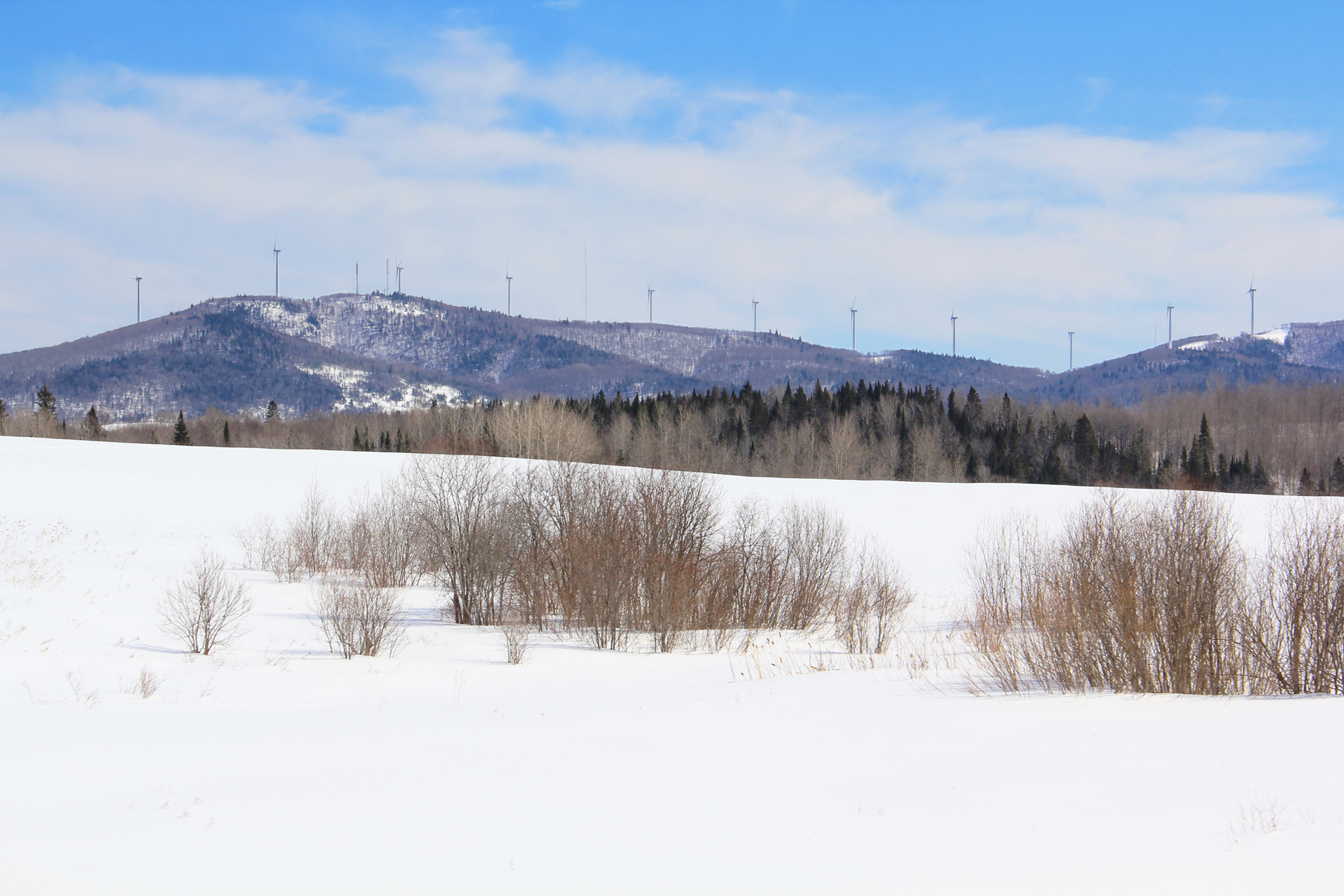
Mars Hill in late winter as seen from US Highway 1

According to the United States Census Bureau, the town has a total area of 35.20 square miles (91.17 km^{2}), of which 35.13 square miles (90.99 km^{2}) is land and 0.07 square miles (0.18 km^{2}) is water. Mars Hill is split partly in half by the Prestile Stream, which runs directly between Fort Street and Silver Street, then crosses beneath the Fort Street Bridge. After passing the bridge, it flows between Pleasant Street and U.S. 1.

Mars Hill is located in the humid continental climate (Köppen climate classification Dfb), with warm, humid summers. Winters are cold and snowy. Daytime highs are generally in the 75–80 °F (24–27 °C) range through July, with overnight lows in the high 50s °F (around 15 °C). January temperatures range from highs near 32 °F (0 °C) to overnight lows averaging below 0 °F (−18 °C).

Climate data for Mars Hill, Maine
| Month | Jan | Feb | Mar | Apr | May | Jun | Jul | Aug | Sep | Oct | Nov | Dec | Year |
|---|---|---|---|---|---|---|---|---|---|---|---|---|---|
| Record high °F (°C) | 55 (13) | 59 (15) | 74 (23) | 84 (29) | 94 (34) | 95 (35) | 96 (36) | 99 (37) | 90 (32) | 84 (29) | 70 (21) | 57 (14) | 99 (37) |
| Mean daily maximum °F (°C) | 20.7 (−6.3) | 25 (−4) | 35.6 (2.0) | 48.3 (9.1) | 64.3 (17.9) | 73.2 (22.9) | 77.2 (25.1) | 75.6 (24.2) | 65.9 (18.8) | 52.9 (11.6) | 38.3 (3.5) | 25.9 (−3.4) | 50.2 (10.1) |
| Mean daily minimum °F (°C) | 1.2 (−17.1) | 4.7 (−15.2) | 16.2 (−8.8) | 29 (−2) | 40.6 (4.8) | 49.8 (9.9) | 55.1 (12.8) | 53.1 (11.7) | 44.6 (7.0) | 34.9 (1.6) | 24.7 (−4.1) | 9.3 (−12.6) | 30.3 (−0.9) |
| Record low °F (°C) | −35 (−37) | −37 (−38) | −30 (−34) | −3 (−19) | 16 (−9) | 26 (−3) | 35 (2) | 29 (−2) | 21 (−6) | 15 (−9) | −15 (−26) | −33 (−36) | −37 (−38) |
| Average precipitation inches (mm) | 2.55 (65) | 1.68 (43) | 2.12 (54) | 2.35 (60) | 3.44 (87) | 3.43 (87) | 3.71 (94) | 3.94 (100) | 3.44 (87) | 3.28 (83) | 2.77 (70) | 2.56 (65) | 35.27 (896) |
| Average snowfall inches (cm) | 18.9 (48) | 17.8 (45) | 17.3 (44) | 7.3 (19) | 0.2 (0.51) | 0 (0) | 0 (0) | 0 (0) | 0.1 (0.25) | 0.6 (1.5) | 8.8 (22) | 17.7 (45) | 88.7 (225) |
| Average precipitation days (≥ 0.01 in) | 11.0 | 7.8 | 9.7 | 10.8 | 12.6 | 12.2 | 12.9 | 11.8 | 11.4 | 12.2 | 11.8 | 11.3 | 135.5 |
| Average snowy days (≥ 0.1 in) | 7.6 | 5.6 | 5.0 | 2.3 | 0.2 | 0 | 0 | 0 | 0 | 0.4 | 3.0 | 6.4 | 30.5 |
Source: NOAA

== Mars Hill Mountain ==
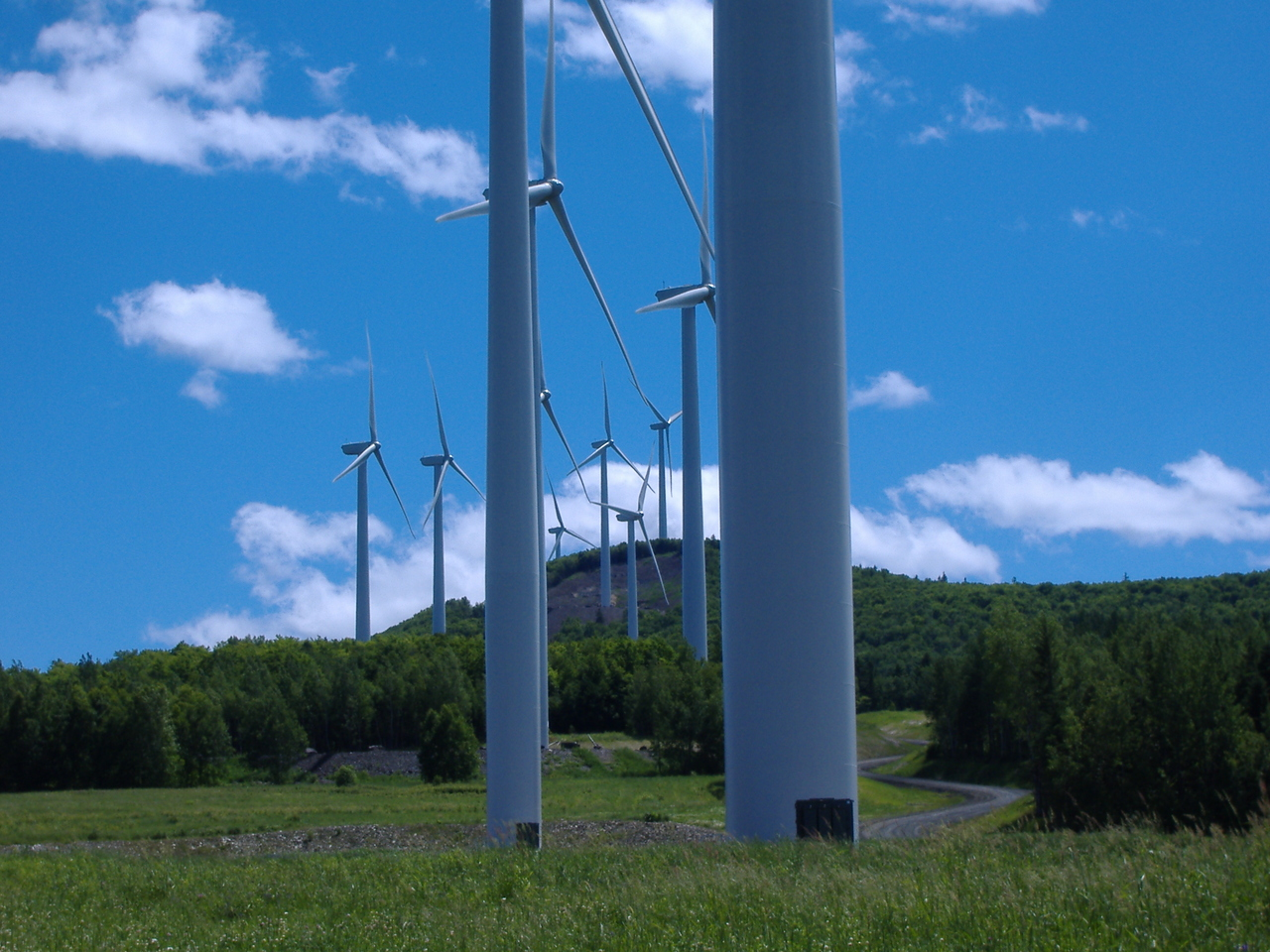
Mars Hill Wind Turbines

Mars Hill Mountain plays an important role in the Mars Hill community, providing a dramatic backdrop for photographs as well as magnificent views from atop its peak. It overlooks the Saint John Valley, in which Mars Hill is located. Maine's tallest mountain, Mount Katahdin is visible from the top of Mars Hill Mountain, over 85 miles (137 km) away.

A wind power project was begun on Mars Hill Mountain in the fall of 2006. A total of 28 GE 1.5 MW wind turbines were installed along the ridge and northern section of the mountain. The windmills are assembled in multiple parts. The towers, which are composed of three sections stacked together have a combined weight of 20,000 pounds, and are 80 meters (260 feet) tall. Each of the turbine's three blades (together, a rotor) are approximately 37 meters (121 feet) long, with a total rotor diameter of approximately 75 meters (246 feet). The rotor diameters of the turbines are comparable to the wingspan of a Boeing 747.

Mars Hill Mountain features a ski area, Big Rock Ski Area.

== Notable residents ==
- Ransford W. Shaw (1857-1945), Maine Attorney General

== See also ==
- Central Aroostook Junior-Senior High School
- Wind power in Maine
