= Big Rock Nature Preserve =

Park in Charlotte, North Carolina

- Big Rock Rockshelter
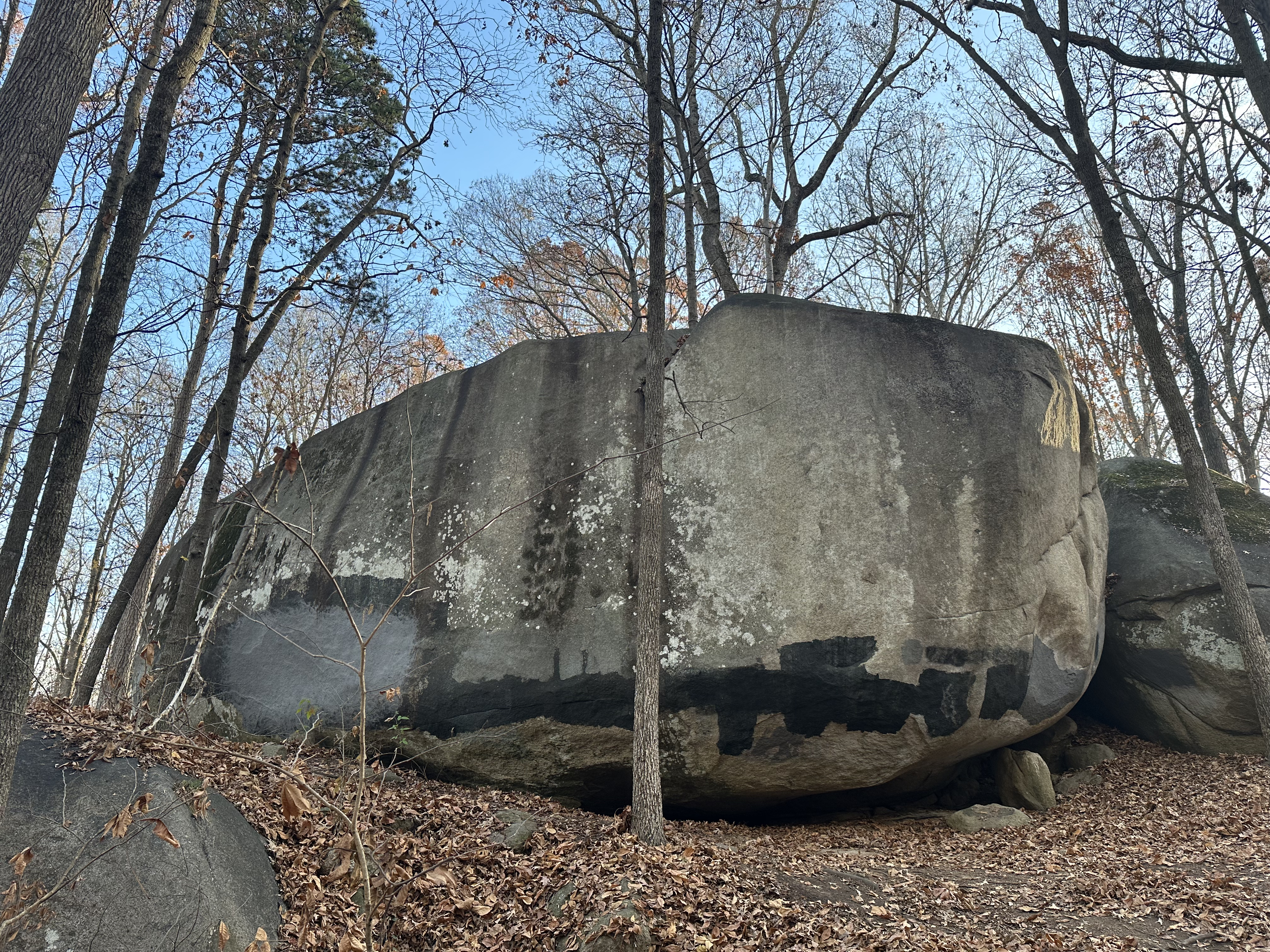
- Interactive map of Big Rock Nature Preserve
- Type: Nature reserve, Historic site
- Location: Charlotte, North Carolina
- Coordinates: 35°3′41.4″N 80°49′39.5″W
- Area: 23 acres (9.3 ha)
- Created: 1994
- Administrator: Mecklenburg County
- Open: Sunrise to sunset

The Big Rock Nature Preserve is a nature preserve and park with a natural rock shelter in Charlotte, North Carolina. Big Rock is known for its "very big and quite significant rocks" which are the largest known exposed boulders in Mecklenburg County. The eponymous rocks are part of a granite pluton and form a natural rock shelter with archaeological evidence of human use dating to 5500 BC.

== Description ==
The park is located in suburban Charlotte. It consists of undeveloped forest and is surrounded by housing developments and Interstate 485. There are three outcroppings of rocks: the two largest are close to the summit of the hill. These rocks are around 6 metres (20 ft) tall and are heavily fractured, forming natural rock shelters around 25 square metres (270 sq ft) in size. A third, smaller outcropping is north of the shelter. There is a natural perennial spring 40 metres (130 ft) north of the rock shelter. This stream eventually flows into a tributary of McAlpine Creek that runs through the property along the bottom of the hill. Parking is available on street and there are trails through the forest.

The forested park is home to oak, hickory, maple, gum, and pine trees in its canopy with dogwood and redbud in the understory. Wild ginger, hearts-a-bursting, peppermint, orchids and ferns can be found growing on the forest floor.

== History ==
The earliest pre-Columbian people to visit Big Rock were Archaic hunter-gatherers who lived a nomadic life and survived by hunting and foraging in the wooded Carolina piedmont. They used the outcrop as a shelter but did not permanently settle at the Big Rock. Later Woodland and Mississippian populations practiced pottery and agriculture and established more permanent settlements at Big Rock. European settlers traveled to the area on the Great Wagon Road starting in the 1740s and by the 1760s the native Catawba people were displaced to their current reservation in South Carolina. These early European settlers mostly ignored Big Rock in favor of practicing farming in the surrounding area. Big Rock was part of James H. Davis' "Big Jim Davis" plantation, one of the largest slave plantations in the region. Mecklenburg County purchased the land that comprises the park in 1994 and 2006. In 2009 it was declared a historic landmark by the Charlotte-Mecklenburg Historic Landmarks Commission.

=== Archaeology ===
The first excavation of the site was done in 1964 by Otto Haas. He excavated the floor of the largest of the shelters, finding potsherds, debitage, tools and a projectile point from the Morrow Mountain culture dated to 5500-4500 BC.

In 1984 Fred W. Fischer did a more thorough excavation at multiple locations around the rocks at the request of the Charlotte-Mecklenburg Historic Properties Commission. While excavating he found four distinct geological strata and enough evidence to create a timeline of the settlement of the site. The deepest stratum, corresponding to the oldest visitors, contained evidence of stone tool work but no pottery, implying that it dates from the Archaic period before the invention of pottery. The relative lack of material found in this layer also implies that these people only used Big Rock as a temporary shelter instead of a permanent settlement. Later settlers from the late Archaic and early Woodland people spent more time at the site and possibly cleared out loose rocks to make the shelter more habitable. In later strata Fischer found potsherds similar to the Mulberry I and Lamar pottery series that are found across the Southeast and dated them to 1300-1450 AD. The uppermost stratum contained projectile points similar to the Caraway Triangular points found in Sugaree and Waxhaw villages in the nearby Yadkin valley dated to 1700 AD. No evidence of Catawba pottery or settlement was found in any stratum.

== Cultural references ==
- ÌBÀ OBÍNRIN, a short film investigating the connection between Black women and their community through dance, was partially filmed at Big Rock Nature Preserve.

== Gallery ==
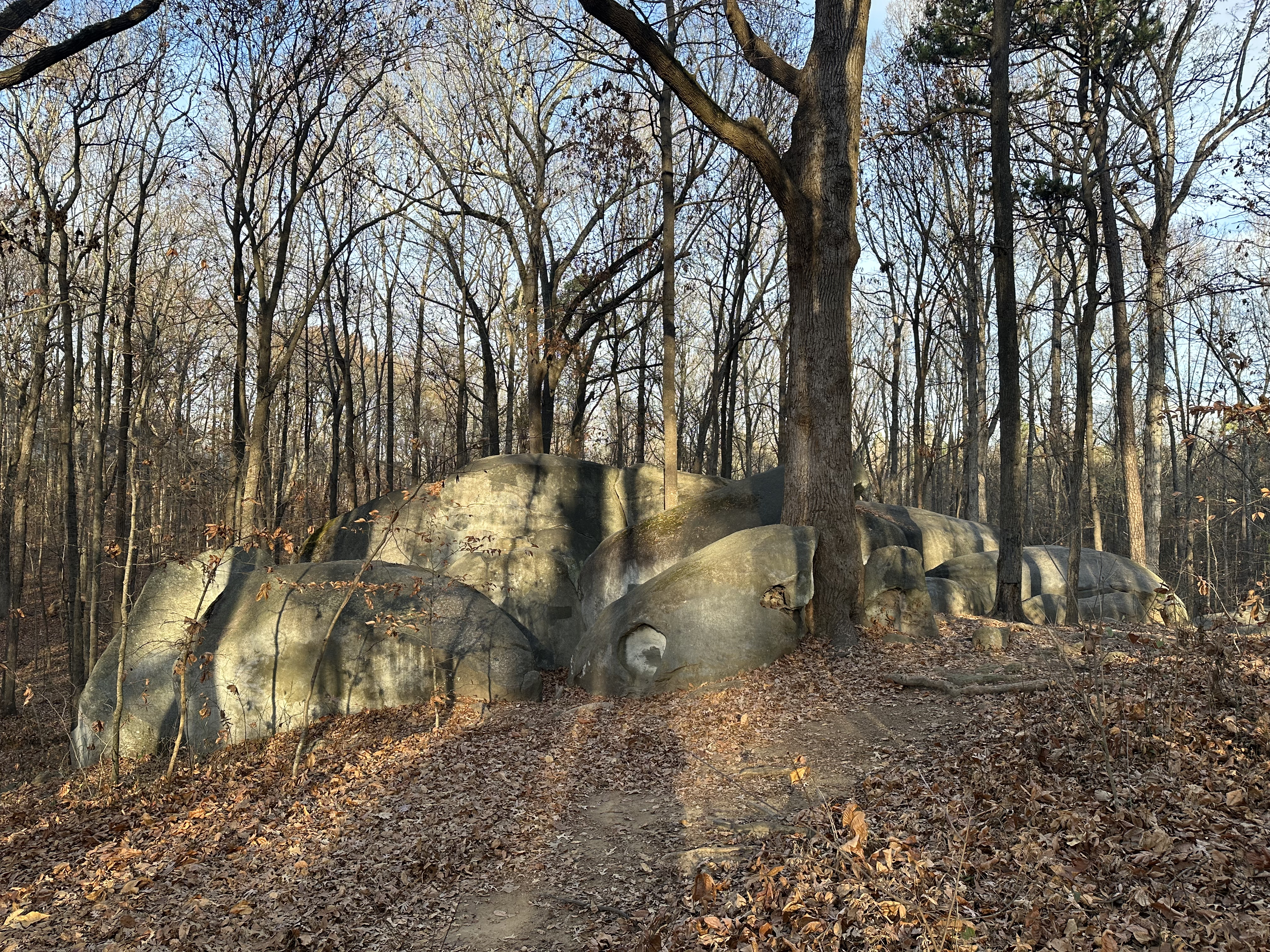
The rocks and the entrance to the rock shelter as you approach from the south

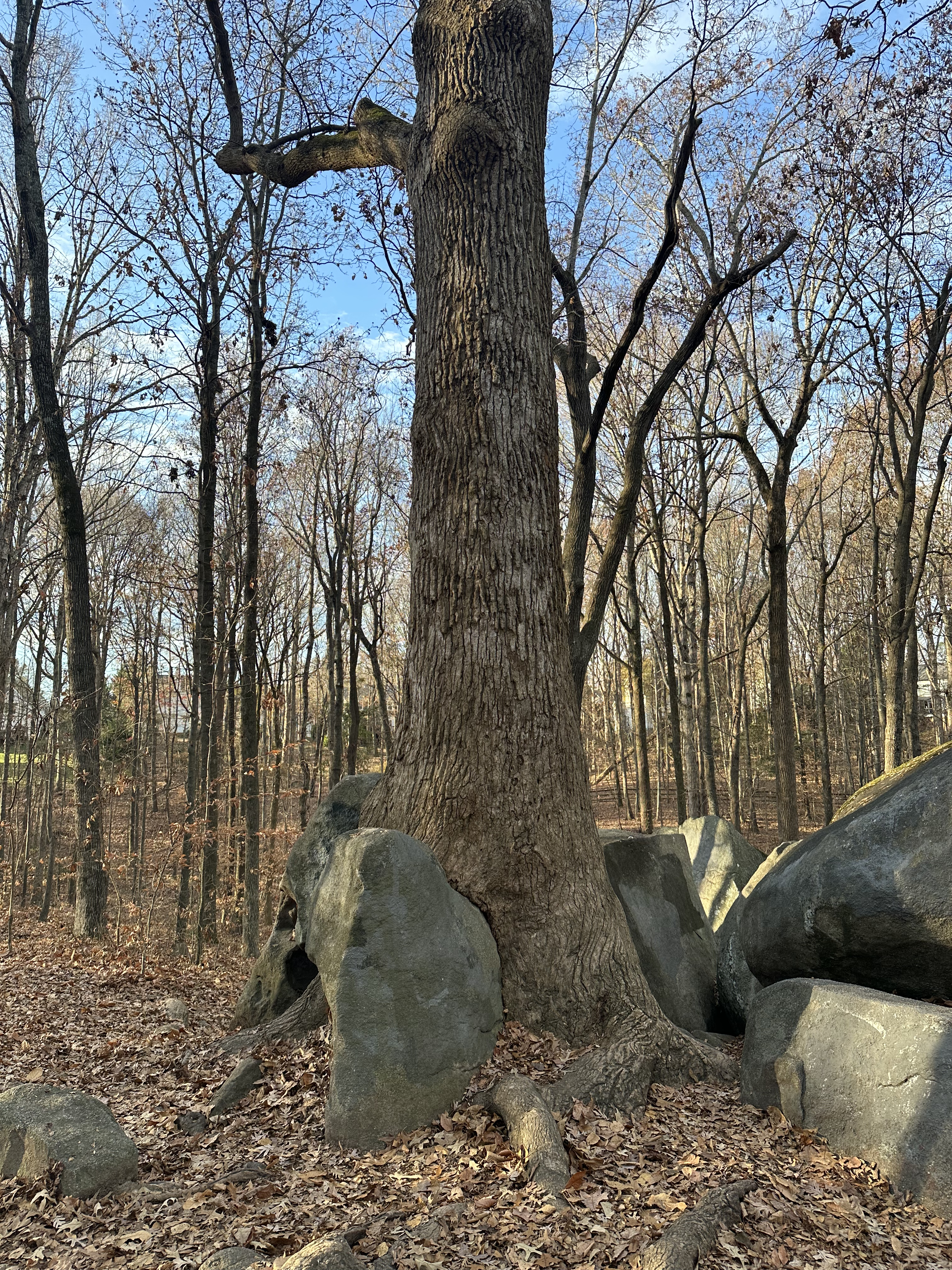
Undisturbed trees grow in and around the rocks to massive size

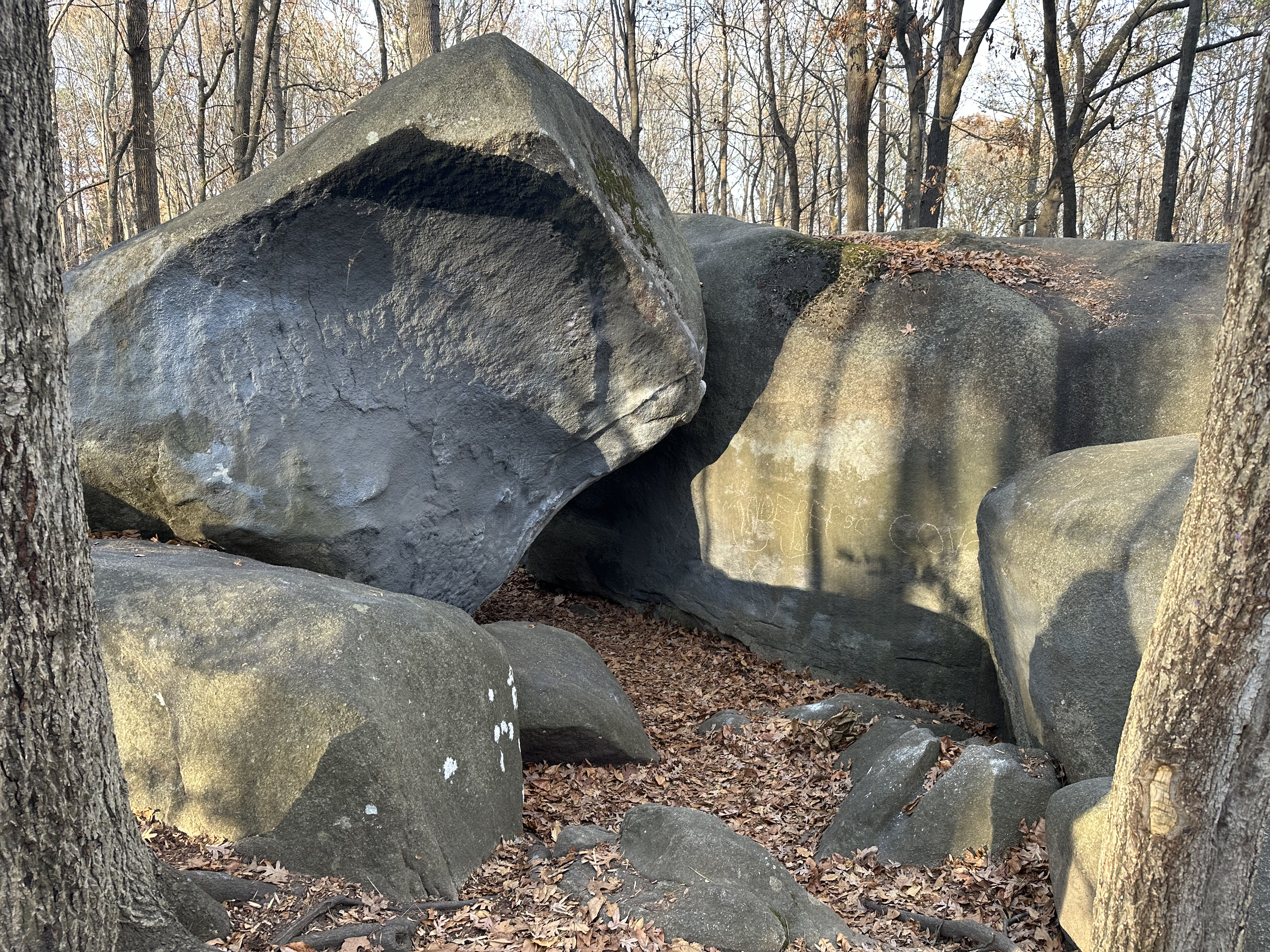
Southern entrance to the rock shelter

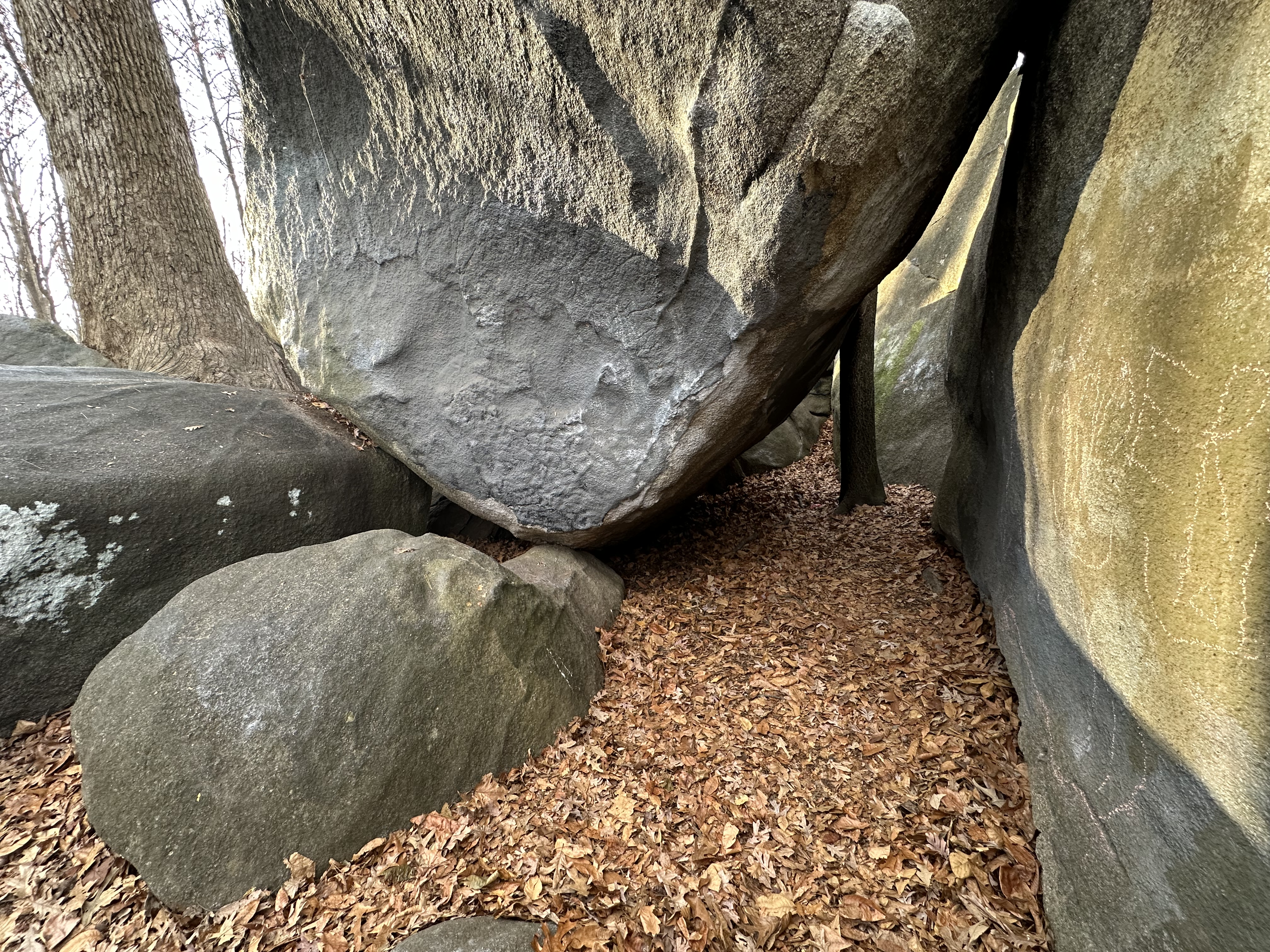
The main rock shelter

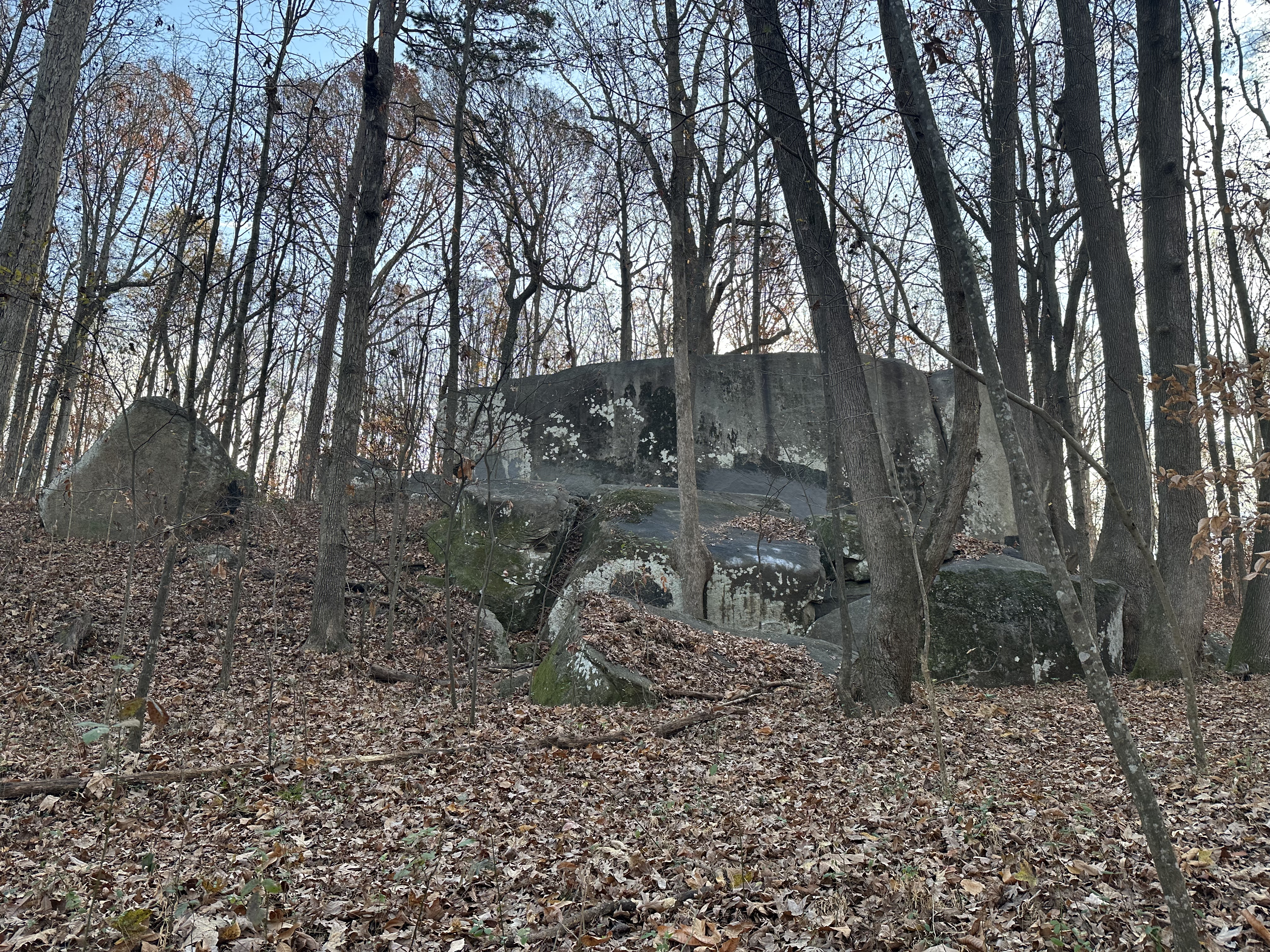
The entire rock complex from the north
