= Central Aroostook Junior-Senior High School =

Central Aroostook High School

Location
- 26 Pleasant Street; Mars Hill, Maine ME 04758; United States
- Coordinates: 46°30′56″N 67°51′40″W

Information
- School type: Public, Elementary and High School
- School district: MSAD 42
- Superintendent: Heidi Garrison
- Principal: Heather Bradbury
- Teaching staff: 19.80 (FTE)
- Employees: 21
- Grades: 7-12
- Enrollment: 166 (2023-2024)
- Student to teacher ratio: 8.38
- Mascot: Panther
- Yearbook: Aroostookan

Central Aroostook High School is a public high school in Mars Hill, Maine, United States, and a part of Maine School Administrative District 42. It has 132 students enrolled as of 2019 and 21 full-time teaching staff providing grades 7–12.

The Maine Department of Education assigns unorganized areas to particular public schools. As of 2025 it assigns Cox Patent (TD R2 WELS) to this school.
