= Big Rock Interchange =

Interchange in Little Rock, Arkansas

- Interactive map of Big Rock Interchange

Location
- Little Rock, Arkansas
- Coordinates: 34°44′54.33″N 92°23′29.24″W
- Roads at junction: I-430; I-630; Chenal Parkway

Construction
- Constructed: 1977
- Maintained by: AHTD

The Big Rock Interchange is the I-430/I-630/Chenal Parkway interchange in west Little Rock, Arkansas. The name is derived from a large rock formation discovered during expansion.

The interchange was originally constructed in 1977, then in the mid-2000s it was decided to expand the interchange in an attempt to alleviate congestion. In 2011 an outcropping of Pennsylvanian Jackfork Formation sandstone and surrounding shale was discovered in the southeast quadrant of the project. The formation was estimated to weigh about 5 million pounds. Due to the size and hardness of the sandstone it was decided to leave the unique and distinctive formation in place as a landmark, rather than use explosives or some other method to try to remove it, and it was dubbed "The Big Rock".

When the original I-430 and I-630 interchange was constructed, about 14,000 vehicles a day traveled down each Interstate, and I-630 ended at a traffic signal at Shackleford Road. With expansion and growth in west Little Rock, and particularly in the Chenal Valley neighborhood, the interchange had become progressively more congested by the early 2000s. In 2004 the Arkansas Highway and Transportation Department began a study to expand the interchange. The first of three phases began January 2009. First phase was construction of an additional I-630 west to I-430 north lane, modification to Financial Centre Parkway (provides access to Chenal Parkway) just west of Shackleford Road, and an additional traffic signal added to Hermitage Drive. Phase two involved preparing the interchange for future work and mainly involved the I-430 bridge over I-630 which was lengthened. Phase three completed the flyover lanes. The $150 million makeover took over six years to complete. Since construction ended, over 200,000 vehicles use the interchange daily.

== Sources ==
- Arkansas Highways
- Arkansas Online
- AMP
- Arkansas Geological
