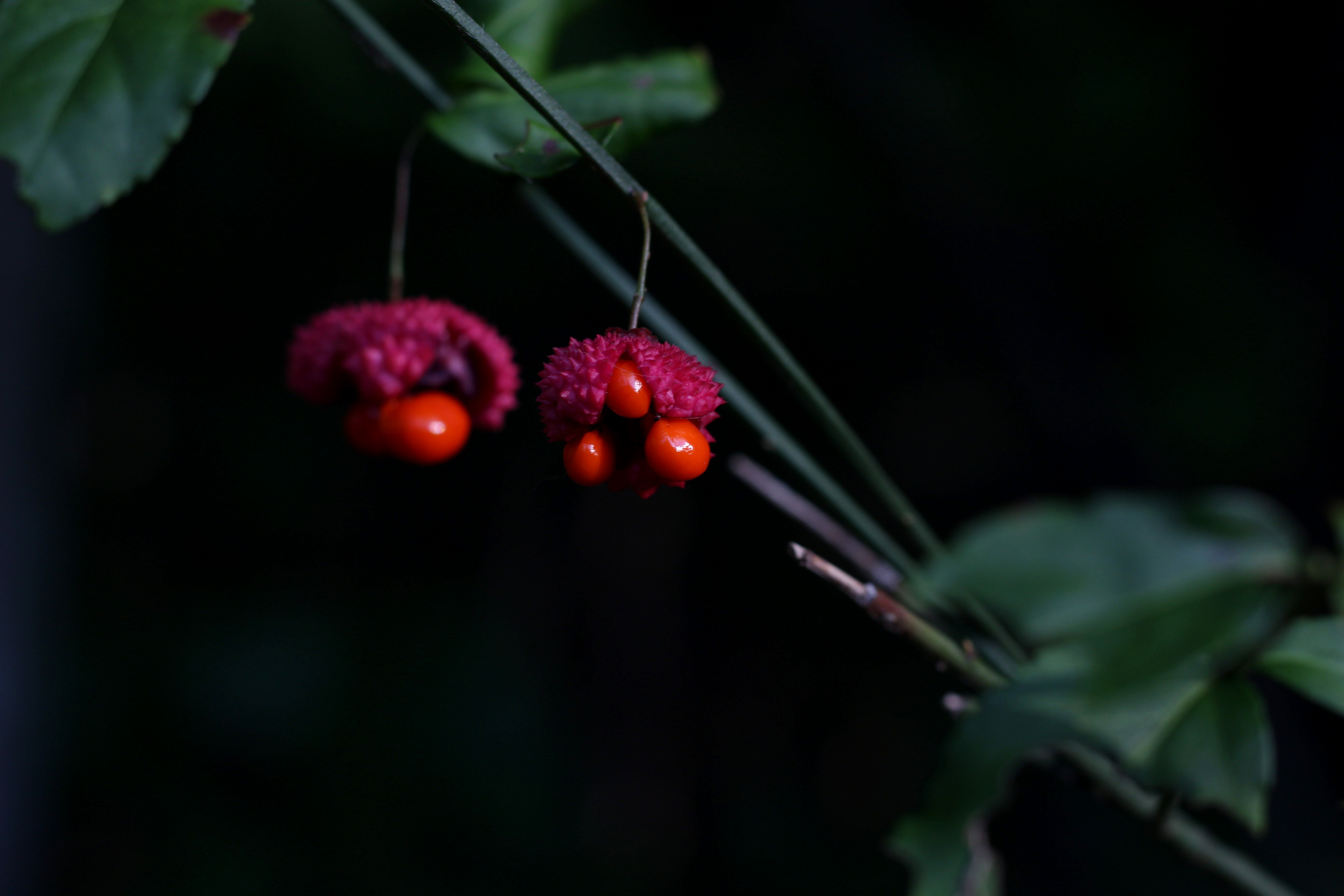
- Euonymus americanus fruit capsule and fruit

Conservation status
- Secure (NatureServe)

Scientific classification
- Kingdom: Plantae
- Clade: Embryophytes
- Clade: Tracheophytes
- Clade: Spermatophytes
- Clade: Angiosperms
- Clade: Eudicots
- Clade: Rosids
- Order: Celastrales
- Family: Celastraceae
- Genus: Euonymus
- Species: E. americanus

Binomial name
- Euonymus americanus L.

= Euonymus americanus =

Species of flowering plant

Euonymus americanus is a species of flowering plant in the family Celastraceae. Common names include strawberry bush, American strawberry bush, bursting-heart, hearts-a-bustin, and hearts-bustin'-with-love. It is native to the eastern United States, its distribution extending as far west as Texas. It has also been recorded in Ontario.

This is a deciduous shrub growing up to 2 metres (6 ft 7 in) tall. The oppositely arranged leaves are leathery or papery in texture and measure up to 10 cm (3.9 in) long. Flowers are borne in the leaf axils on peduncles up to 2.2 cm (0.87 in) long. The yellow-green sepals are 1 or 2 cm (0.39 or 0.79 in) long and the greenish or reddish petals above are smaller. The fruit capsule is about 1.5 cm (0.59 in) wide with a red warty or spiny covering. The capsule splits into five sections, revealing seeds covered in bright red arils.

The seeds are dispersed by animals. Deer have been known to graze on this plant and seem to love the tender leaves and stems. Humans should take the red color of the seeds as a warning; they are known to be a strong laxative and cause severe diarrhea. In fact, this genus of plants in general is considered poisonous to humans.

== Description ==
Euonymus americanus is a deciduous shrub that grows low to the ground only reaching up to 2 metres (6.6 ft) high. Euonymus americanus grows white and green flowers that produce orange and red colored fruits. The white flowers on Euonymus americanus start to form unique pink fruit capsules that look somewhat like the common strawberry and will start to open in the fall months revealing large orange seeds.

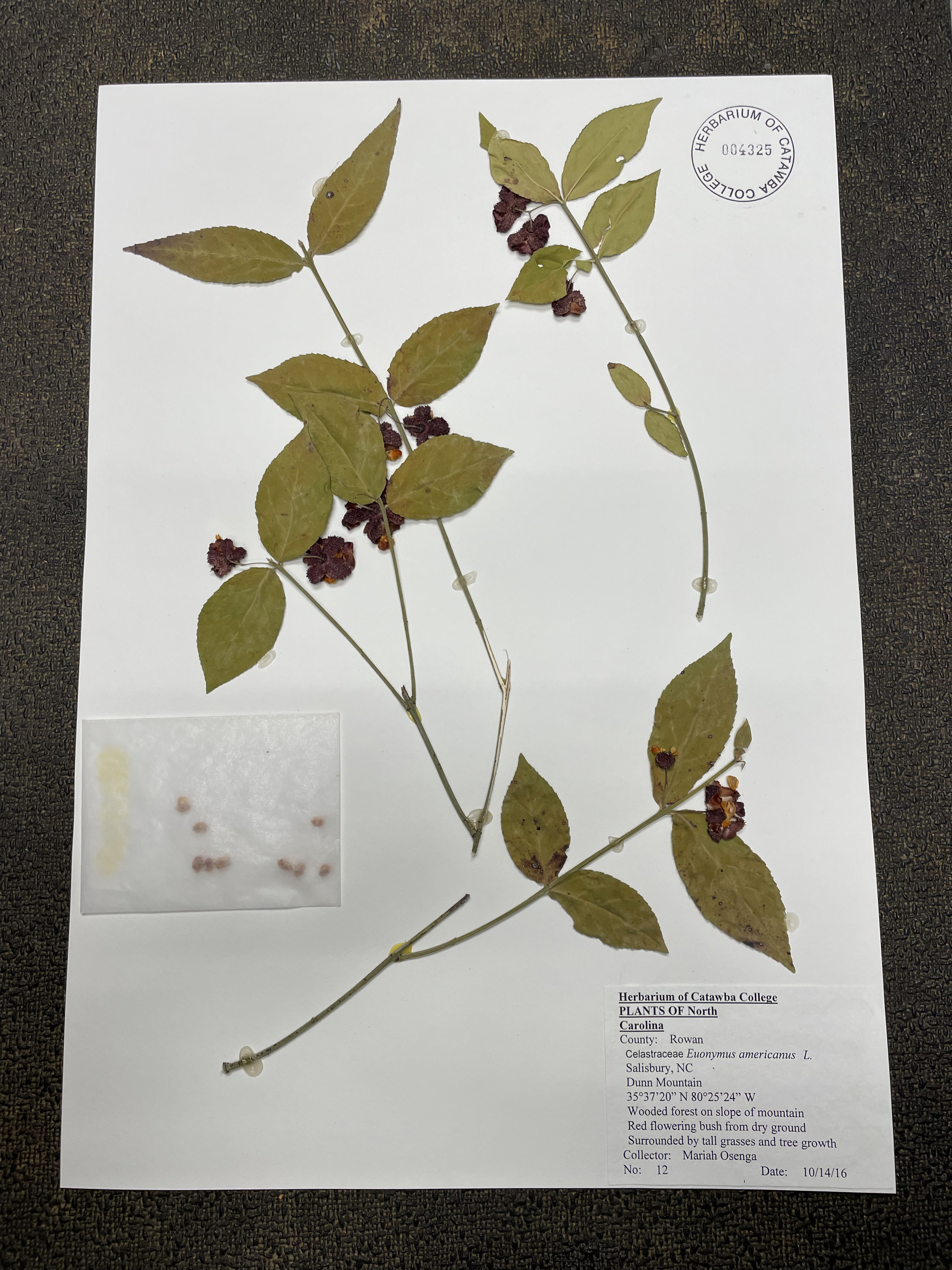
Pressed Euonymus americanus from Catawba College's herbarium

== Taxonomy ==
Euonymus americanus is one out of 1,300 species within the Celastraceae family which is also known as the bittersweet family. Euonymus americanus L. was described by Carl Linnaeus in 1753. Some common names of Euonymus americanus include hearts-bustin'-with-love, bursting-heart, and the american strawberry bush. Euonymus americanus has three subspecies including Euonymus americanus var. angustifolius, Euonymus americanus var. obvatus and Euonymus americanus var. sarmentosus. The American Strawberry Bush also has eight different synonyms including Euonymus alternifolius and Euonymus angustifolius.

== Distribution and habitat ==
Although Euonymus americanus L. is one of the 1,300 species members in the Celastraceae family, it is the only species that is found exclusively in the United States. The American strawberry bush is found in wetland areas such as margins of swamps, shaded stream banks, and sloped wetlands. However, though it resides in moist areas, it is not a flood tolerant species; therefore, only being able to grow in moderately saturated soils. The shrub can grow in shaded conditions.

== Traditional uses ==
Native Americans used the roots of the Euonymus americanus to make a tea that would aid in uterine prolapse, vomiting of blood, stomach aches, malaria, liver congestion, constipation, and urinary tract infections. The bark of the shrub was also used in aiding dandruff control when the bark was turned into a powder-like substance. Additionally, the seed of the American strawberry bush can be used as a strong laxative.

== Conservation ==
The American strawberry bush is common in most of its range. However, it is listed as endangered in the state of New York.

== Wildlife uses ==
Euonymus americanus has vibrant fruits and foliage during the early autumn season which can attract white-tailed deer and rabbits. The white-tailed deer also eats the twigs. The bright orange-red aril that covers the seed provides a source of fat and sugar to songbirds, small mammals, and wild turkeys. The seeds are dispersed by animals like birds and deer. It has been marked as a pollinator plant, supporting and attracting bees, beetles, flies, and ants.

== Diseases and insect pests ==
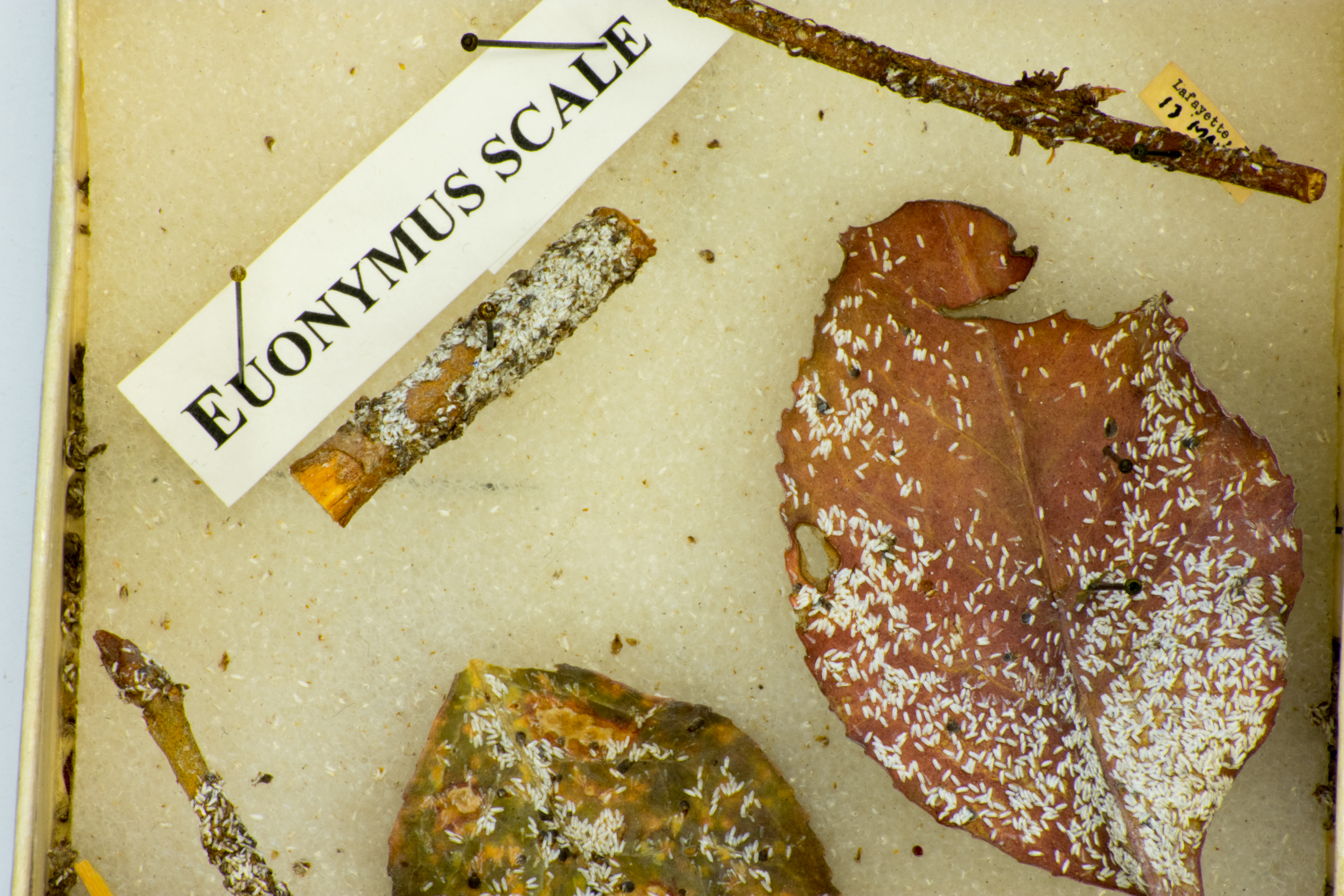
Infested leaves

Unaspis euonymi, also known as euonymus scale, is the most common pest found on Euonymus. Scales have no legs that are visible to the naked eye and are small, motionless insects that vary in appearance depending on the sex and age of the scale. Euonymus scales pierce the leaf or stem of the Euonymus plant and feed on the sap. The initial indication of an infestation of euonymus scale is the development of yellow spots on the leaves. A heavy infestation can be seen as clusters of white on the top and bottom of the leaf as well as the stems. These heavy infestations can kill the branches or even the entire plant.

Some common diseases that are developed in Euonymus include powdery mildew, anthracnose, cercospora leaf spot, scab, and crown gall.

Euonymus is host to webworm larvae of the American ermine moth Yponomeuta multipunctella.

== Gallery ==
Flowers

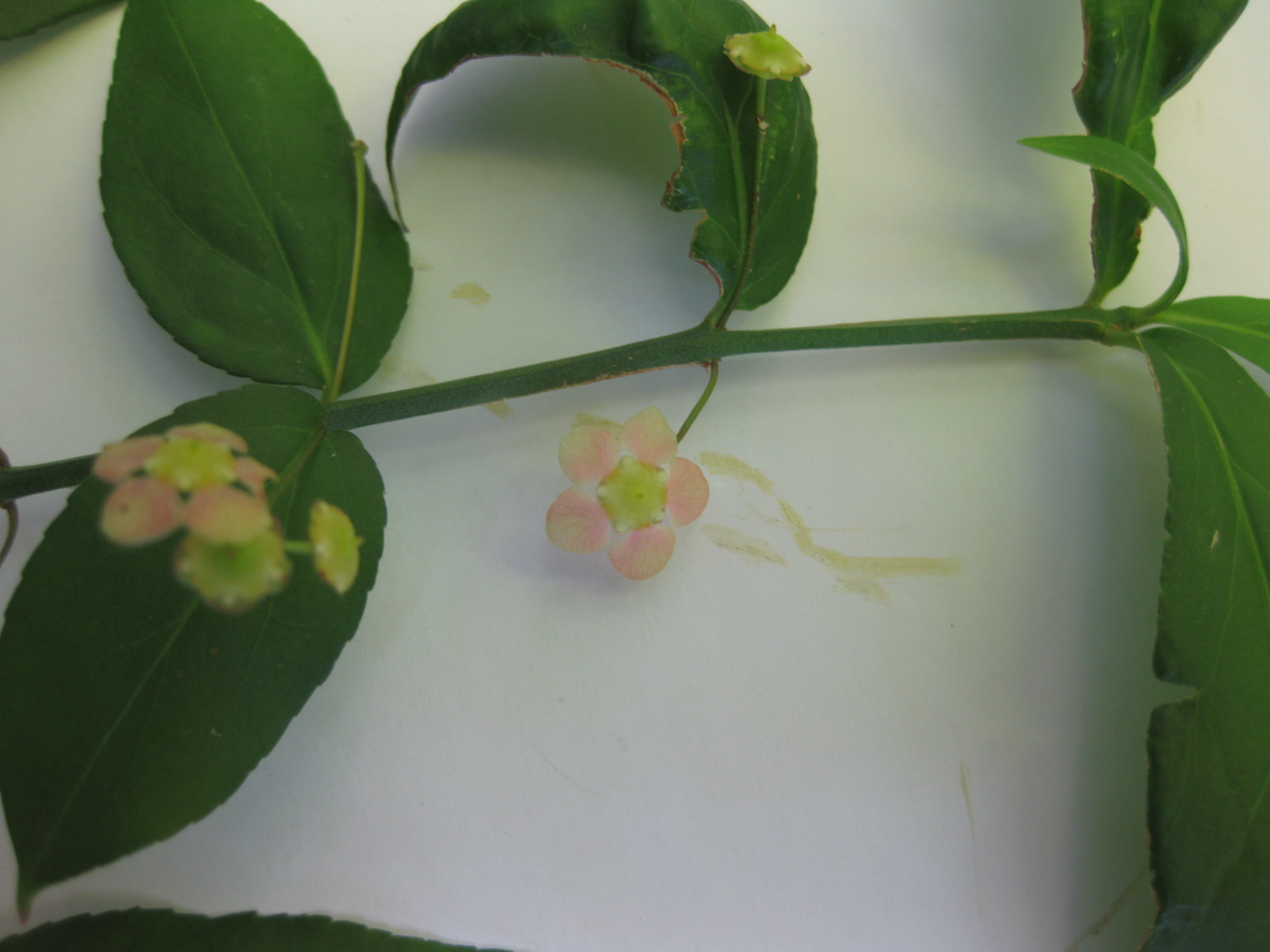
Leaves

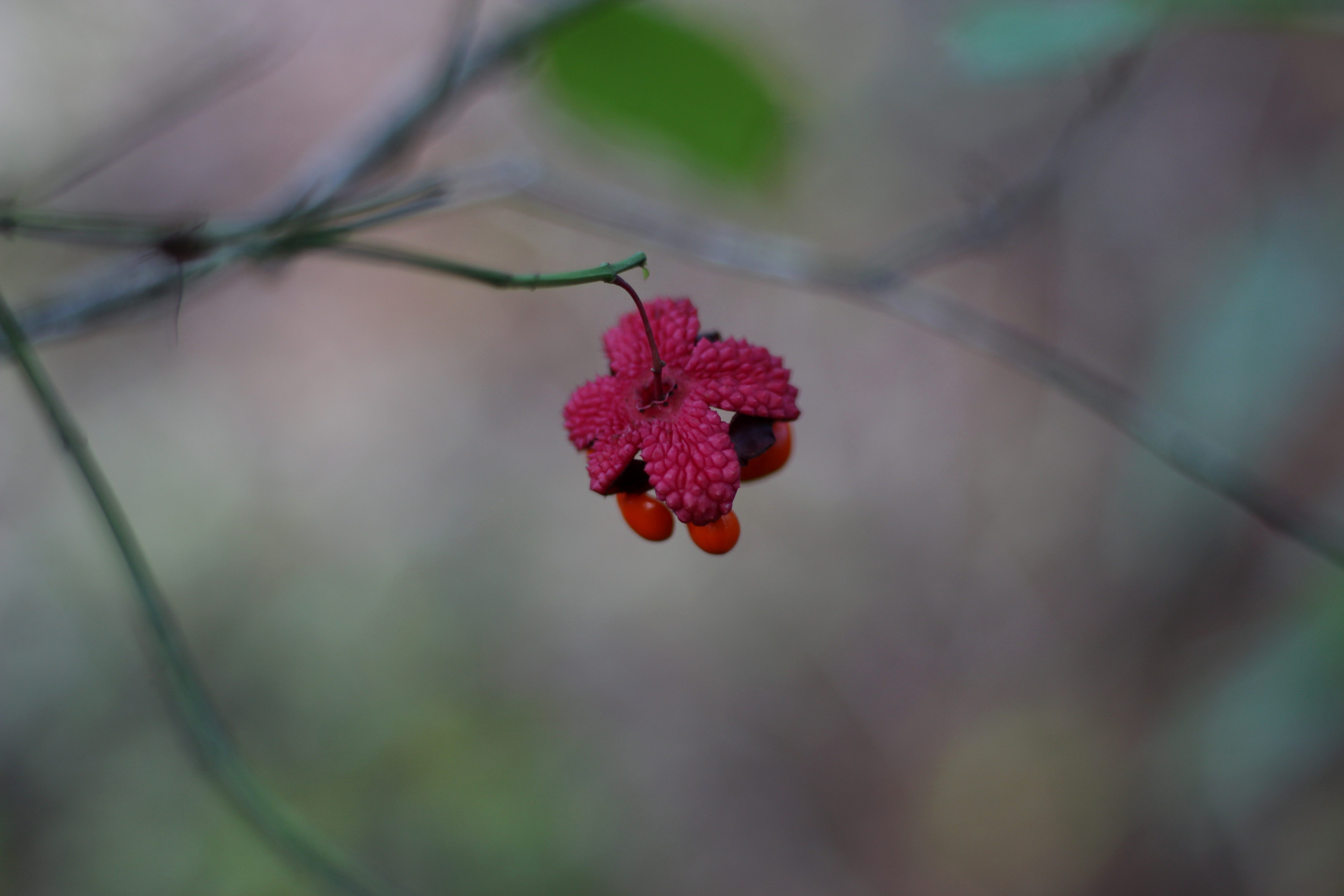
Fruit capsule

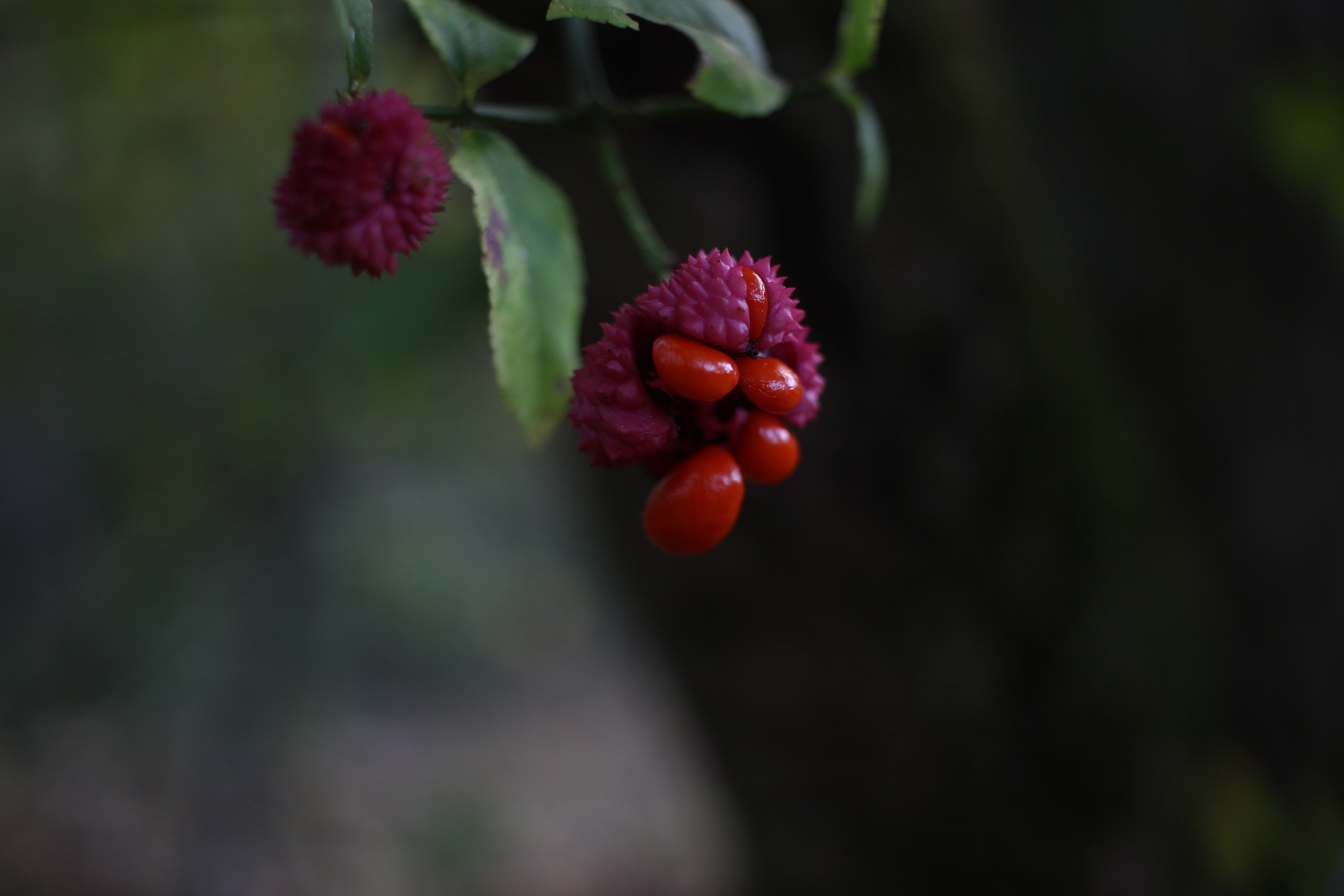
Underview of fruit and fruit capsule

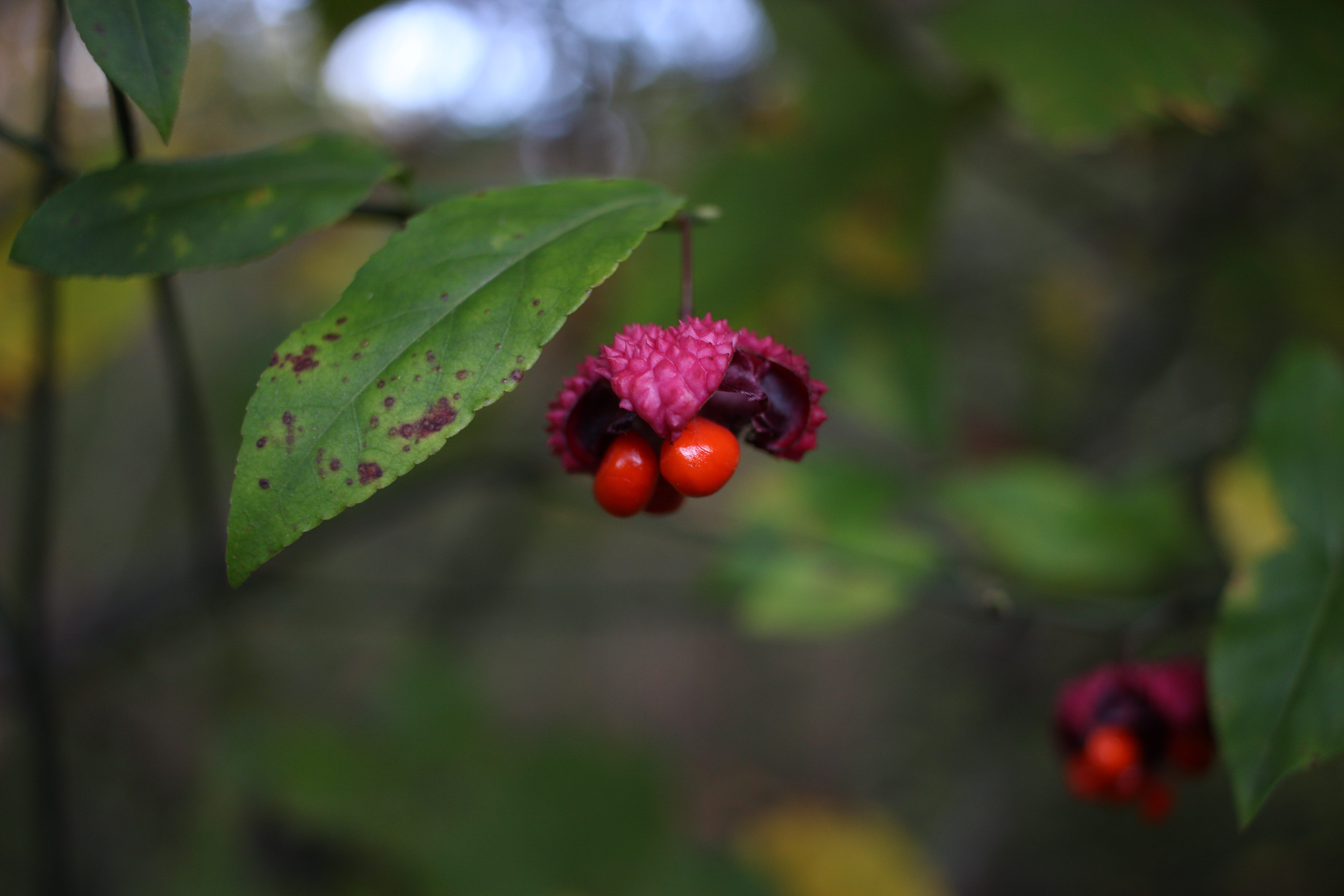
Fruit body with leaf
