= Big Rock Falls =

Waterfall in Belize

Coordinates: 17.0352335716°N 88.9807766676°W

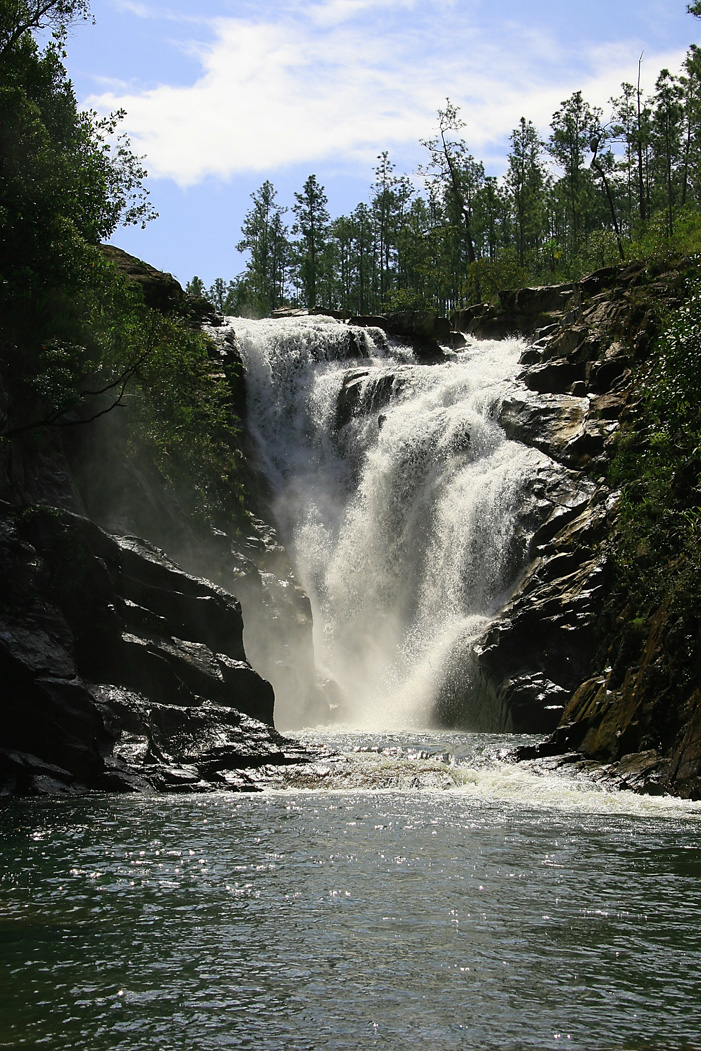
Big Rock Falls

Big Rock Falls is a 150-foot waterfall on Privassion River, in the Mountain Pine Ridge Forest Reserve of the Cayo District of Belize.

== See also ==
- List of waterfalls
