= Mountain Pine Ridge Forest Reserve =

Forest Reserve in Belize

- IUCN category IV (habitat/species management area)
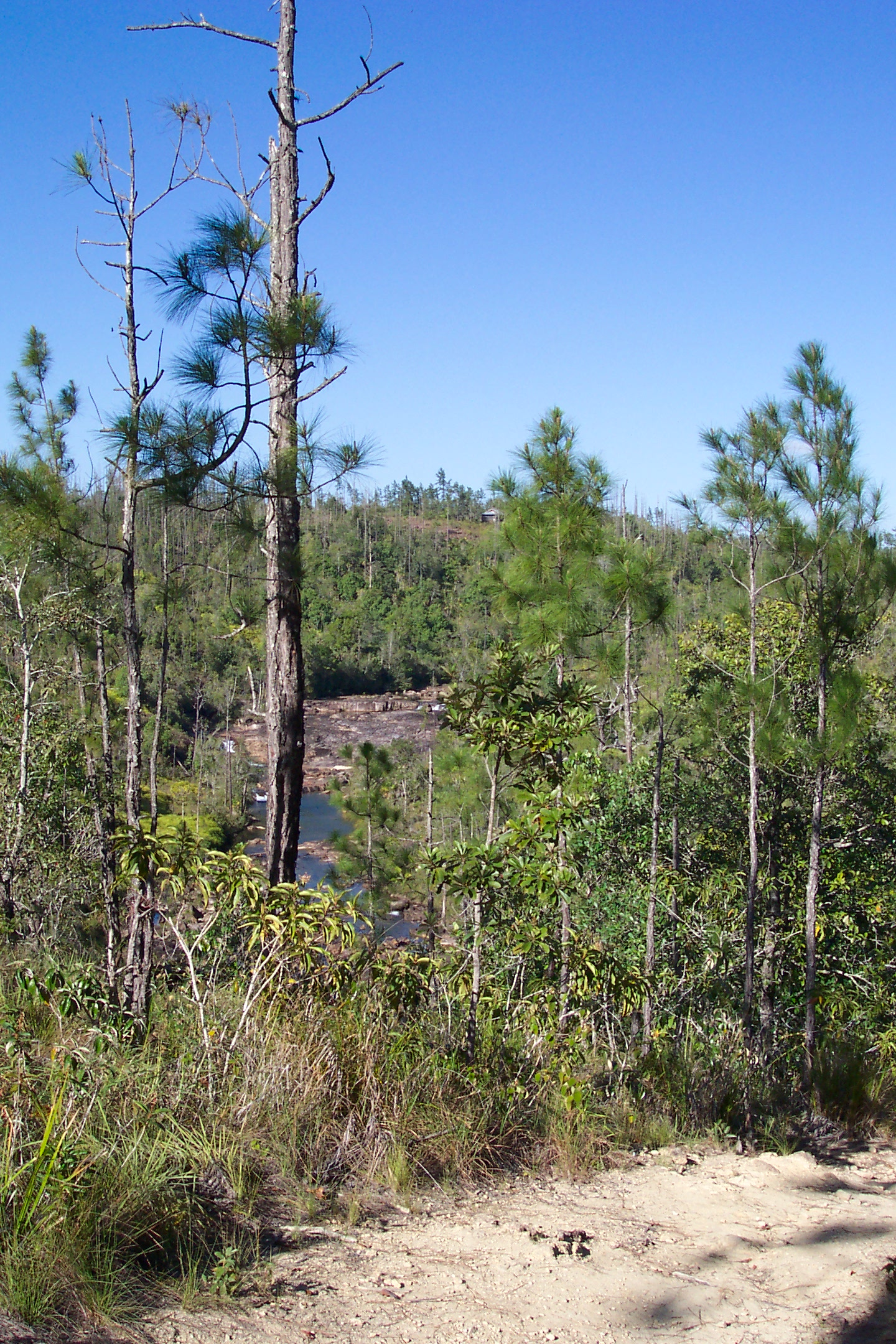
- Mountain Pine Ridge Forest Reserve

- Location within Belize
- Location: Cayo District, Belize
- Nearest city: Belmopan
- Coordinates: 16°57′54″N 88°54′40″W
- Area: 430 km^{2} (170 sq mi)(106,353 acres)
- Established: 1944

Mountain Pine Ridge Forest Reserve is a protected area in the Cayo District of southern central Belize. It was established in 1944 to protect and manage the native Belizean pine forests. Its boundaries are poorly defined, but it is estimated to cover an area of 106,352.5 acres (430 km^{2}), although much of the reserve has been leased.

== Geography ==
The reserve is predominantly pine forest (58.5%), primarily Caribbean pine, Pinus caribaea var. hondurensis, but with a significant broadleaf forest component (36.8%). There are small areas of grassland (3.4%) and wetland (0.6%). Roads, rivers and other features make up the remainder of the area (10.9%). The climate is subtropical with a rainy season from July to February. During the dry season (February to May) temperatures may reach 39 °C (102 °F) with a humidity level of 70%.

The majority of the reserve is situated on a granite massif, with some areas of limestone in the west of the reserve (remnants of a limestone plateau laid during the Jurassic). Sinkholes and caves are common in the limestone areas. The underlying soils are predominantly sandy. The elevation of the reserve averages between 400 and 700 m (1,312 to 2,296 ft) with the highest point being Baldy Beacon at 1,017 m (3,336 ft), and dropping to 120 m (394 ft) at the lowest point on the Macal River.

The Macal River forms the boundaries of the reserve to the west and south and is fed by tributaries including Rio Frio, Rio On, Privassion Creek and Pinol Creek. To the north-east some small streams feed into Barton Creek.

== History ==
Little is known of the early history of the area. The Maya had a city at Caracol on the borders of the modern reserve as early as 1200 BC, and Mayan artifacts discovered in Barton Creek Cave suggest that it was used as a ritual site. There is no mention of Mountain Pine Ridge in Hummell's 1921 report of Belizean forests, but it is believed he may have been the first forester to visit the area in 1897. To control increasing forestry activity in the area, a region of 1,504,000 acres (6,086 km^{2}) was designated as forest reserve in October 1944, but despite fire control measures being established in 1945, much of the forest was destroyed by a fire in 1949. Few trees in the existing forest date to before this period. The reserve was reclassified in 1952 as a production forest and the 1950s saw the provision of roads and a landing strip. In 1959, the area of the reserve was reduced, losing some land to the neighboring Sibun Forest Reserve. Hunting was banned in the reserve in 1978 in recognition of the nature conservation role that could be played by the reserve.

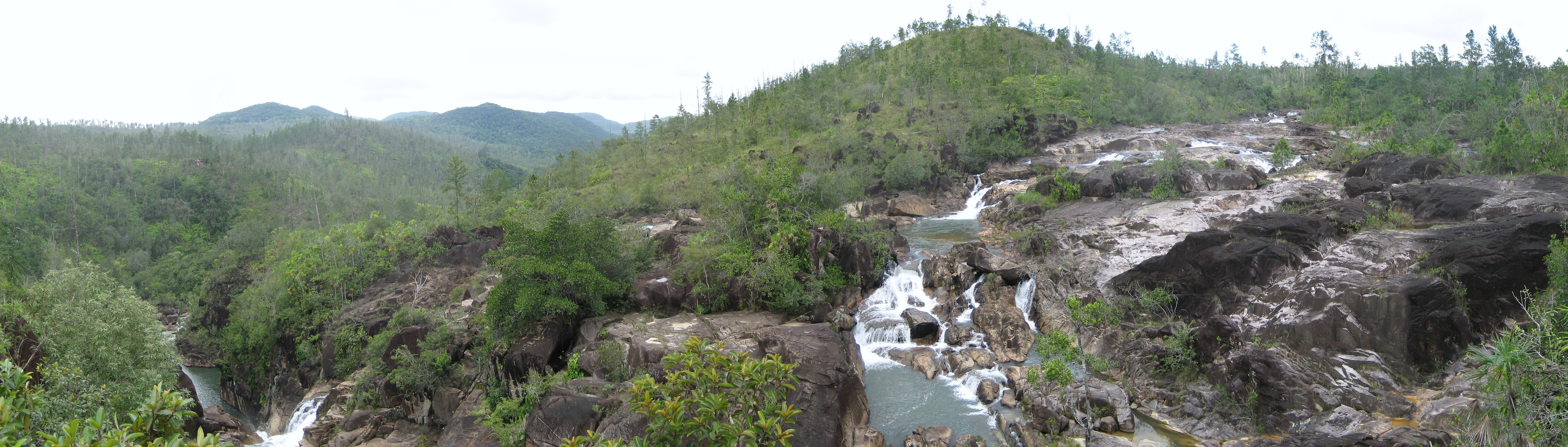
Panoramic view of the reserves numerous mountains

== Fauna ==
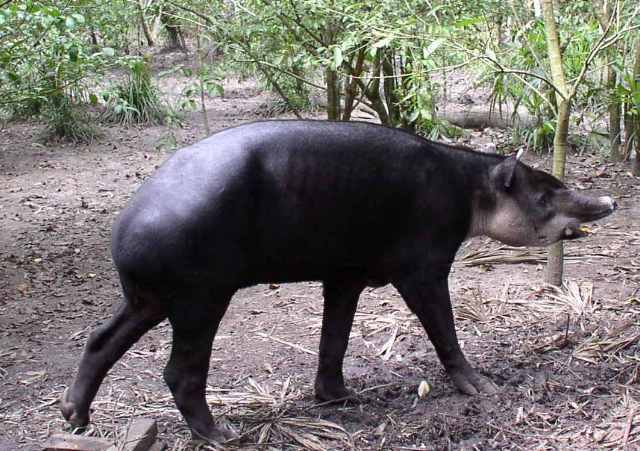
Baird's tapir, the national animal of Belize, may be seen in the reserve

The reserve is home to various large mammals, including cougars, jaguars, ocelots, white-nosed coatis, and Baird's tapirs. There is a small population of Morelet's crocodiles.

Native species of bird include the rufous-capped warbler, common crossbill, pine siskin, eastern bluebird, stygian owl, king vulture, ocellated turkey, acorn woodpecker, Lesson's motmot, plumbeous vireo, keel-billed toucan and red-lored parrot. Winter visitors include the hepatic tanager and chipping sparrow. Orange-breasted falcons are more common in the area than elsewhere in Belize. Other fauna present in the reserve are the frog species Rana juliani (which is restricted to the Maya Mountains) and Eleutherodactylus sandersoni, and the fish species Poecilia teresae. The pine forest has been seriously damaged by the southern pine beetle, Dendroctonus frontalis, with 80% of the trees showing signs of attack.

== Notable features ==
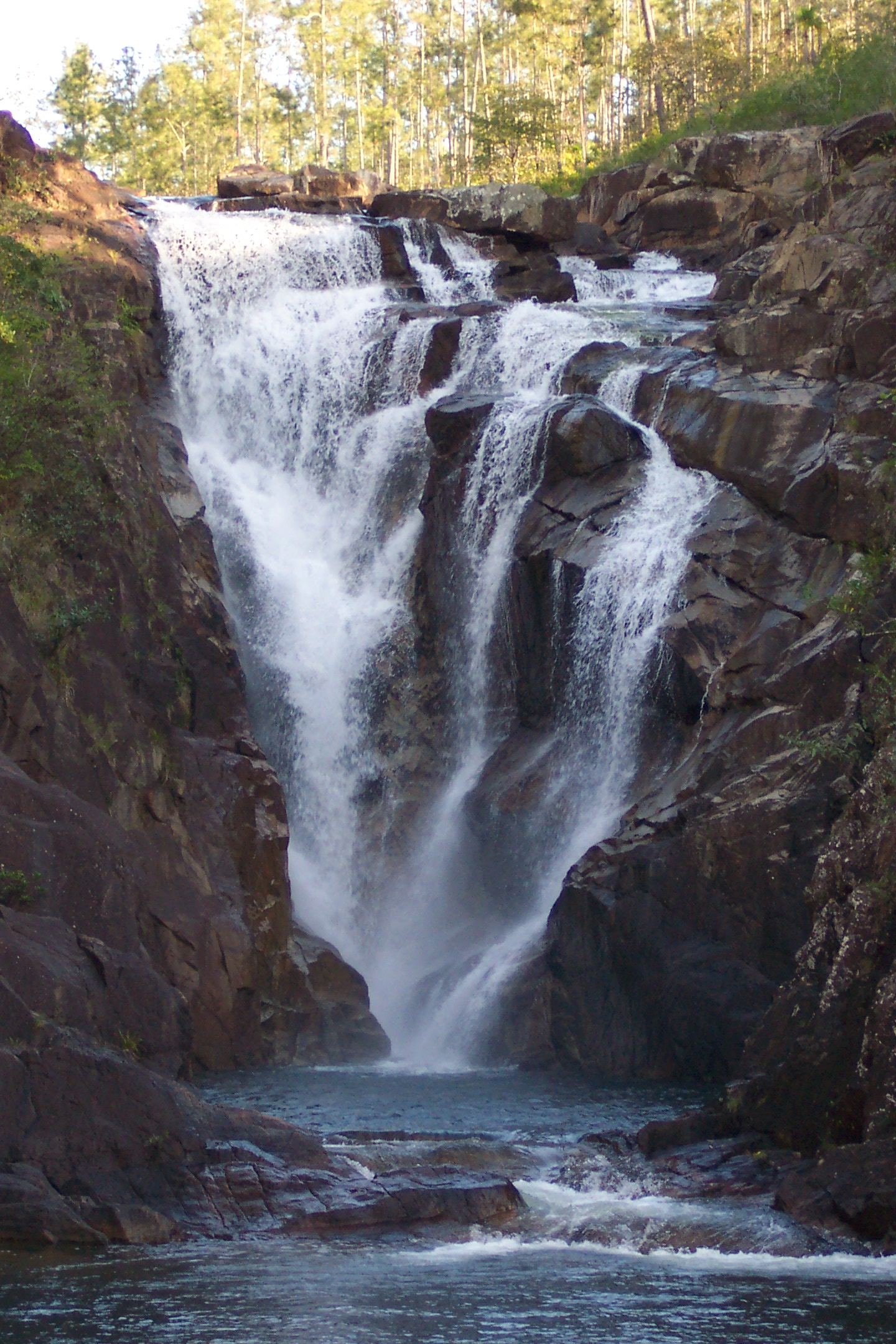
Big Rock Falls on Privassion Creek.

At Barton Creek, there is a large river cave that may extend up to 4.5 miles (7.2 km) and has not been fully explored. It is accessible only by boat, and archaeological investigations have uncovered a large number of Mayan relics from the various ledges above the river, suggesting it was used for rituals. The Rio Frio Cave through which the Rio Frio runs, has the largest entrance of any cave in Belize. There are small waterfalls on the Rio On and larger drops at Big Rock Falls on the Privassion Creek and Hidden Valley Falls. Baldy Beacon provides uninterrupted views over the reserve, as its soil is too poor to support any vegetation other than some hardy grasses.

== Population ==
The area is sparsely populated with the highest concentration (a few hundred people) located at Douglas D' Silva Forest Station, the administrative headquarters of the Western Division of the Forestry Department. A former logging settlement at San Luis is now abandoned.
