= Big Rock (West Coast) =

Island in New Zealand

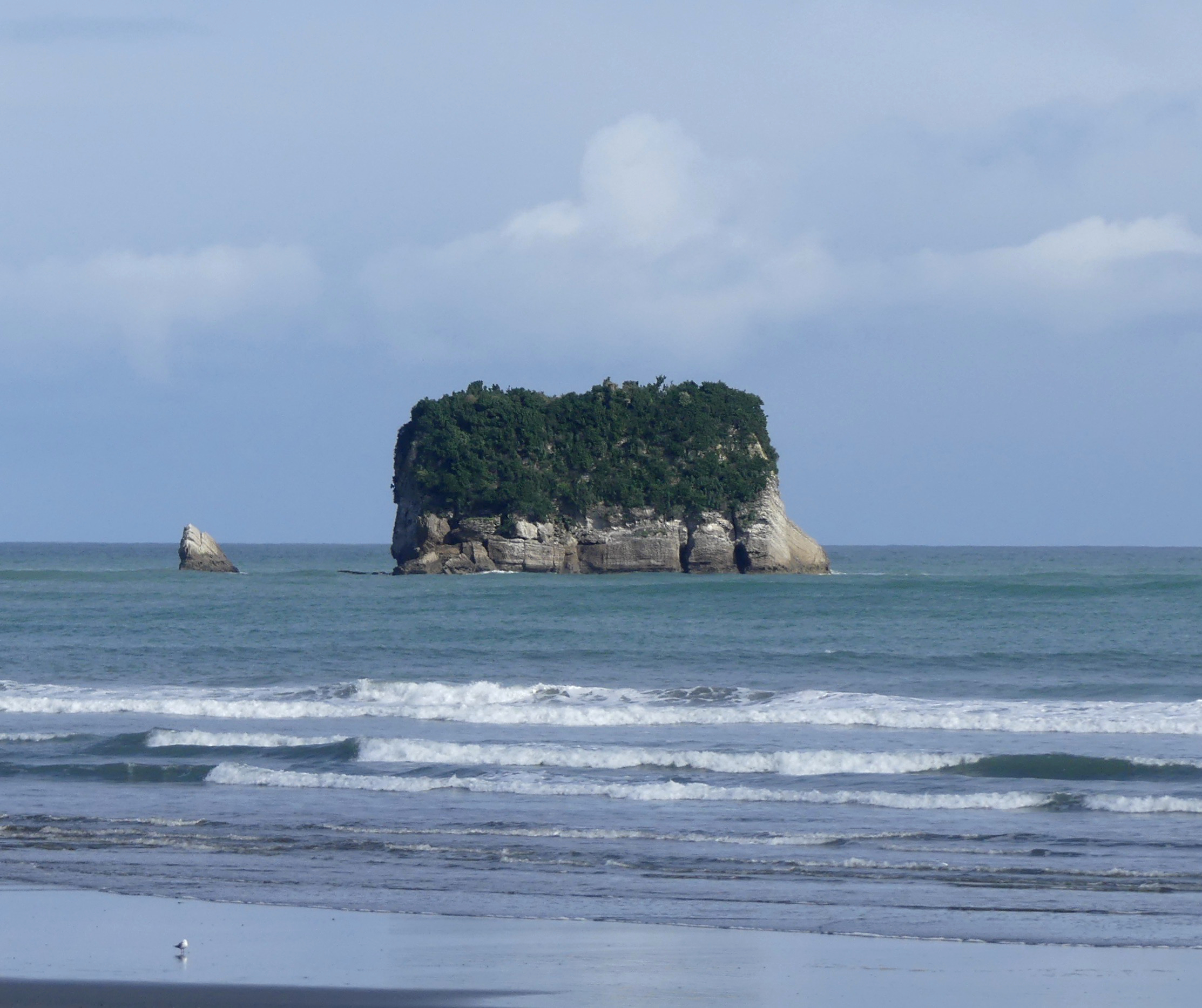
- Big Rock in 2020
- Interactive map of Big Rock

Geography
- Coordinates: 42.375306°S 171.218056°E

Administration
- New Zealand
- Region: West Coast

Demographics
- Population: Uninhabited

Big Rock is an uninhabited island in the West Coast Region of New Zealand. It is north of Point Elizabeth and west of the Seven Mile Creek. The name Big Rock is unofficial.

== See also ==
- List of islands of New Zealand
