= Big Rock (ski resort) =

Ski area in Mars Hill, Maine

Bigrock

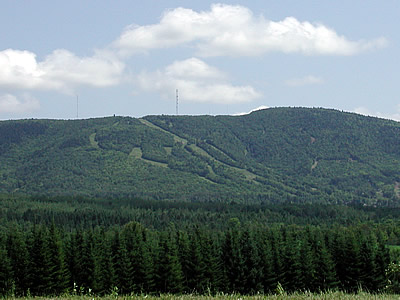
- Bigrock in the Summer
- Interactive map of Bigrock
- Location: Mars Hill, Maine, United States
- Nearest city: Presque Isle, Maine
- Coordinates: 46°31′20″N 67°49′40″W
- Top elevation: 1,590 feet (480 m)
- Base elevation: 670 feet (200 m)
- Trails: 28
- Lift system: 3
- Website: www.bigrockmaine.com

BigRock Mountain is located in Mars Hill, Maine, on the western face of Mars Hill. It is one of the larger ski resorts in the State of Maine with 2 chairlifts, 26 trails, 80% snowmaking, night skiing, and almost 1000 ft of continuous vertical drop.

== Terrain ==
Most of the terrain at BigRock is intermediate ski trails, serviced by the North Star Double Chair, a modified Mueller chairlift. The mountain is also serviced by a poma. The beginner area is serviced by the South Star Triple Chair. Of the trails, 58% are intermediate, while 30% are advanced trails, and 18% beginner trails.

== History ==
Established in the 1960s, BigRock Ski Area was purchased in 2000 by the Maine Winter Sports Center (MWSC) through grants available from the Portland-based Libra Foundation.

MWSC added cross-country and snowshoe trails, as well as a snow-tube park. BigRock's lodge has been expanded to include a new cafe.
