= Big Rock Creek (Minnesota) =

Stream in Beltrami and Clearwater County, Minnesota, U.S.

Coordinates: 47°52′26″N 95°12′34″W

Big Rock Creek is a stream in Beltrami and Clearwater counties, Minnesota, in the United States.

Big Rock was named from two large boulders near its mouth.

== See also ==
- List of rivers of Minnesota
