= Big Rock Creek (Missouri) =

Stream in the U.S. state of Missouri

Coordinates: 40°24′56″N 94°19′42″W

Big Rock Creek is a stream in Harrison and Worth counties in the U.S. state of Missouri. It is a tributary of the East Fork of the Grand River.

The stream headwaters arise in western Harrison County at at an elevation of approximately 1160 feet. The source area lies just east of Missouri Route 46 and the stream flows southwest into southeastern Worth County passing southeast of the community of Allendale. The confluence with the East Fork is one mile north of Denver at at an elevation of 896 feet.

Big Rock Creek was so named on account of the rocky character of its watercourse.

== See also ==
- List of rivers of Missouri
