= Sarstoon =

Sarstoon may mean:

- Sarstoon River
- Sarstoon Island
- Sarstoon-Temash National Park
  - Sarstoon Temash Institute for Indigenous Management
