= 2016 Belize–Guatemala border standoff =

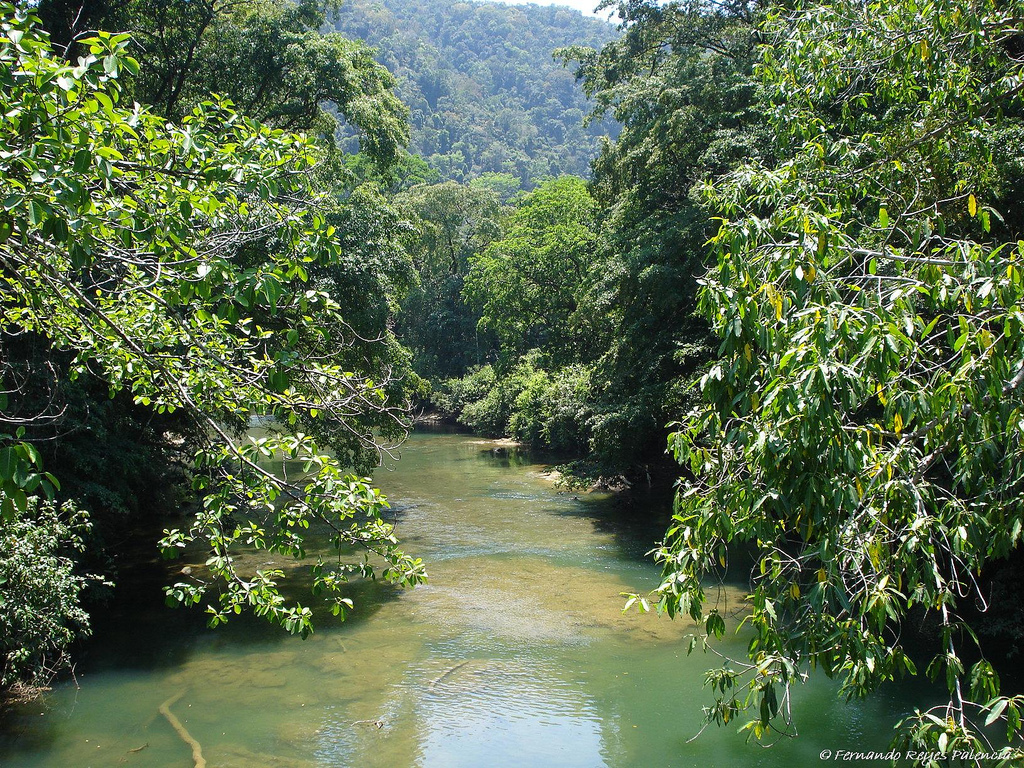
- The Sarstoon River
Location	Belize–Guatemala border
Result	Further strain in Belize–Guatemala relations

Belligerents
Belize	Guatemala

Units involved
Belize Defence Force	Armed Forces of Guatemala: Kaibiles

Strength
Unknown	3,000

Casualties and losses
- 1 civilian killed, 2 others injured

The 2016 Belize–Guatemala border standoff began when Belizean soldiers fatally shot a 13-year-old Guatemalan in the Cebada area of the Chiquibul National Park in western Belize with Guatemala.

== Events ==
Guatemalan authorities claimed that Julio René Alvarado Ruano, his father and his younger brother were shot by Belizean soldiers on 20 April 2016, while they were hunting in the Belize forest near the northern department of Petén. Julio died in hospital shortly afterwards from the severity of his wounds, while his father and brother were wounded but not critically. In a different version of events, Belize says its troops shot in self-defence after coming under fire while on patrol, and added that Julio's body was found just inside Belizean territory.

The Belizean government claimed in a statement that according to initial reports, its security forces were investigating illegal land clearing in the Cebada area of the Chiquibul National Park in western Belize when they detained a Guatemalan man suspected of illicit activities. It said the patrol came under fire around nightfall and shot back in self-defence. Before leaving the location just inside Belizean territory, the soldiers found the teenager's body, which was taken to Belize City for an autopsy. The Guatemalan foreign ministry said the autopsy conducted in Belize determined that the teenager had been shot eight times, including four times in the back, by a high-powered, military-grade rifle.

In response to the shooting, the Guatemalan government ordered the deployment of 3,000 troops along its border, including the special forces unit known as the Kaibiles, and recalled its ambassador to Belize.

== See also ==
- Belizean–Guatemalan territorial dispute
- Death of Julio René Alvarado
