= Death of Julio René Alvarado =

Guatemalan conflict victim (c. 2002–2016)

Coordinates: 16.65254°N 89.16553°W

Julio René Alvarado Ruano (c. 2002 – 20 April 2016) was a fourteen-year-old Guatemalan boy who was killed in the Belize–Guatemala adjacency zone during an armed confrontation between the Belize Defence Force, Belizean park rangers, and Guatemalan farmers. The incident raised tensions between Belize and Guatemala, who have an ongoing border dispute since 1821. Belizean officials maintain that the Belize Defence Force acted in self-defence. However, the Guatemalan government claims the incident was a deliberate attack carried out by Belize's military. After the incident, the Organisation of American States agreed to investigate the death of Julio Alvarado at the request of both countries.

== Circumstances ==
The confrontation in which Julio was killed occurred in the Belize-Guatemala adjacency zone, on the Belizean side, 562 meters from the border, on the 20 April 2016.

According to Belizean authorities, Belize Defence Force personnel and FCD park rangers were resting by a corn field when at 7 pm Julio's father, Carlos Ramirez, and other companions started flashing lights. Upon being asked to stop, Ramirez and his associates began shooting at the personnel, prompting the personnel to return fire. During the confrontation, Julio's father and brother were injured but escaped to Guatemala. Julio, however, was fatally shot and died on the scene. After the fact, the BDF soldiers transported Julio's body to a Belizean hospital for an autopsy to be performed. A park ranger indicated that he used a shotgun while another ranger used a .22 calibre pistol. The BDF soldiers used M4 carbines but alleged that their bullets missed.

Julio's father, Carlos Ramirez, gave a different account of what transpired. According to Ramirez, he, his sons and other associates, all unarmed, were crossing a corn field after planting pumpkin seeds when at 6:15 pm Belizean forces ambushed them and proceeded to shoot. He stated that as he fled, he saw his son Julio dead on the ground. Julio Alvarado is now the tenth Guatemalan to be killed by Belizean forces near the Belize-Guatemala border since 1999.

Prior to the death of Julio Alvarado, tensions were already high due to Guatemala claiming the entire Sarstoon River at the southern border of Belize while Belize maintained that each country was entitled to half of the river. Additionally, Guatemalan fishermen and military forces were allegedly encroaching into Belizean waters by the Toledo district of Belize.

== Aftermath ==
The president of Guatemala Jimmy Morales decried the incident as a "cowardly and excessive act that has the total condemnation of the Guatemalan state". In response to the killing of Julio Alvarado, the Guatemalan ambassador to Belize was recalled to Guatemala. Then, the Guatemalan military dispatched 3000 soldiers to the borders with Belize to protect the border area. Guatemala's president also blamed the "murder" of Julio Alvarado on Belize's military and called for an investigation by the Organisation of American States so that those responsible could be brought to justice. The Government of Belize agreed to the investigation but maintained that the Belizean personnel rightfully defended themselves, though it led to the fatal shooting of Julio Alvarado. Other subsequent reports revealed that Belizean forces had already encountered Julio in Belizean territory prior to the incident and had escorted him to the Guatemalan side.

Guatemala claimed that Julio was killed with a military grade rifle but autopsy reports showed that the bullets came from a .22 calibre pistol and a shotgun. Julio Alvarado was laid to rest the weekend following his death. Julio was buried in La Rejoya, in the Peten department of Guatemala close to the border with Belize.

== Investigation ==
In a press release, the Organisation of American States agreed to investigate the incident at the request of both countries. The investigators allegedly found that the Guatemalan military had removed evidence from the scene. However, bullet holes found in nearby tree branches suggested that the Belizean military had been fired at from where Julio was found. The investigation report concluded that "the shooting happened when the Belize patrol came under fire under the cover of night and...they fired back in self-defence". The report also exonerated the Belizean military as the bullets that killed Julio came from the weapons of the park rangers.

The president of Guatemala rejected the reports as inconclusive and called for a second investigation. The foreign minister of Guatemala also rejected the reports and hoped that the International human rights Court would investigate the incident. On the contrary, the Belizean government supported the OAS report and did not intend to call for a second investigation into the death of Julio Alvarado.

== See also ==
- 2016 Belize–Guatemala border standoff
- List of killings by law enforcement officers in Belize
