= Omar Figueroa (politician) =

Belizean politician

Member of the Belize House of Representatives for Cayo North
- Incumbent
- Assumed office 5 January 2015
- Preceded by: Joseph Mahmud

Personal details
- Party: United Democratic Party

Omar Figueroa is a Belizean politician and a member of the United Democratic Party (UDP). He was elected in January 2015 as Area Representative for the Cayo North constituency in the Cayo District. Figueroa is also a biologist and conservationist. Prior to his political career, Figueroa studied jaguars in the Maya Forest Corridor. As of 2020, Figueroa serves as the Minister for Fisheries, Forestry, the Environment, and Sustainable Development.

== Early life ==
In the early 2000s, Figueroa studied jaguars in the Maya Forest Corridor of the Maya Forest for his PhD project. He spent several years collaring and tracking jaguars in order to better understand their movements. In 2013, Figueroa published his dissertation, The Ecology and Conservation of Jaguars (Panthera onca) in Central Belize: Conservation Status, Diet, Movement Patterns and Habitat Use.

== Political career ==
In November 2014, Figueroa's predecessor, Joseph Mahmud, unexpectedly resigned from the House of Representatives. A by-election in Cayo North to determine Mahmud's successor was held on January 5, 2015. Figueroa won the by-election by a nearly 2-to-1 margin, increasing the UDP's overall majority in the House. On January 12, 2015, Figueroa was sworn in to his first cabinet position, Minister of State in the Office of the Prime Minister.

Figueroa was re-elected in the 2015 general election by a 3% margin. After re-election, Figueroa was appointed Minister of State for the Ministry of Fisheries, Forestry, the Environment and Sustainable Development. On February 20, 2020, Figueroa was promoted to substantive Minister for Fisheries, Forestry, the Environment, and Sustainable Development.

After the resignation of John Saldivar as UDP party leader on February 12, 2020, Figueroa stood as a candidate to replace him as UDP party leader, but later withdrew from the race.
