= 2019 Belizean territorial dispute referendum =

- 8 May 2019
- Do you agree that any legal claim of Guatemala against Belize relating to land and insular territories and to any maritime areas pertaining to these territories should be submitted to the International Court of Justice for final settlement and that it determines finally the boundaries of the respective territories and areas of the parties?

Results
Choice	Votes	%
Yes	53,388	55.37%
No	43,029	44.63%
Valid votes	96,417	99.28%
Invalid or blank votes	702	0.72%
Total votes	97,119	100.00%
Registered voters/turnout	148,500	65.4%

A referendum on the territorial dispute with Guatemala was held in Belize on 8 May 2019. Voters were asked whether the territorial dispute with neighbouring Guatemala should be referred to the International Court of Justice.

The vote had originally been scheduled for 10 April but was delayed by a legal challenge. When it took place, the proposal was approved by 55% of voters.

== Background ==
A commitment to take the Belizean–Guatemalan territorial dispute to the International Court of Justice was signed by the countries' governments in December 2008. A referendum was held in Guatemala on the proposal on 15 April 2018. As required by previous agreements, a referendum was required to be held in Belize within six months. Guatemalan Vice President Jafeth Cabrera stated that the Belizean vote would be held in May 2018, but the Belizean government released a statement denying the claim and stated that the referendum would be held after a voter re-registration process has occurred to ensure an accurate and fair vote.

=== Delay ===
The referendum was challenged in court by the opposition People's United Party (PUP) on the grounds that it was based on the 2008 Special Agreement between Belize and Guatemala, which might lead to territorial changes that were inconsistent with Belize's constitution. That led to an injunction being issued by the Supreme Court, delaying the referendum. Following the issuing of the injunction, the Belizean government introduced legislation that it believed would address the injunction. However, the PUP claimed that an amendment to the constitution, requiring a two-thirds majority vote, was needed before the referendum could be held.

The Belizean government's new referendum legislation was passed by the House of Representatives on 12 April 2019, and by the Senate on 15 April. The PUP objected to the new referendum bill on the grounds that it was based on the 2008 Special Agreement, which was still the subject of the court proceedings under which the injunction delaying the referendum was issued. PUP attorney Kareem Musa stated that the PUP would have supported a referendum based on the pre-existing referendum legislation, which did reference the 2008 Special Agreement.

The European Union, the United Kingdom, and the United States issued a joint declaration, dated 11 April 2019, urging the Belizean government to hold a vote as soon as possible. Guatemalan president Jimmy Morales also urged the government to hold the referendum quickly. Meanwhile, Morales sparked controversy by drawing Belize as part of Guatemala during a visit to a school. On 15 April 2019, Guatemalan gunboats also prevented the Belizean coast guard from patrolling the Sarstoon River on the border between the two countries.

On 15 April 2019, the Belizean government asked for the injunction to be set aside in light of the 10 April deadline for holding the referendum and introducing a new referendum bill had passed. The court refused to set aside the injunction before the substantive hearing, and set the hearing for 29 April.

== Results ==
The referendum passed by more than 10 percent of the vote nationwide. Yes won 22 of the constituencies, with nine voting no.

Choice	Votes	%
For	53,388	55.37
Against	43,029	44.63
Total	96,417	100.00
Valid votes	96,417	99.28
Invalid/blank votes	702	0.72
Total votes	97,119	100.00
Registered voters/turnout	148,500	65.40
Source: Elections & Boundaries Department

=== By district ===
Division	District	For		Against		Invalid/ blank	Total votes	Registered	Turnout (%)
Division	District	Votes	%	Votes	%	Invalid/ blank	Total votes	Registered	Turnout (%)
Belize	Freetown	1,432	63.00	841	37.00	8	2,281	3,020	75.53
Belize	Caribbean Shores	1,337	64.00	752	36.00	13	2,102	2,751	76.41
Belize	Pickstock	1,045	55.94	823	44.06	20	1,888	2,550	74.04
Belize	Fort George	637	64.28	354	35.72	5	996	1,409	70.69
Belize	Albert	1,215	72.32	465	27.68	22	1,702	2,109	80.70
Belize	Queen's Square	1,467	81.00	344	19.00	10	1,821	2,170	83.92
Belize	Mesopotamia	1,200	77.32	352	22.68	19	1,571	2,212	71.02
Belize	Lake Independence	1,079	43.99	1,374	56.013	29	2,482	3,768	65.87
Belize	Collet	1,680	70.41	706	29.59	29	2,415	3,392	71.20
Belize	Port Loyola	1,689	64.91	913	35.09	25	2,627	4,462	58.87
Belize	Belize Rural North	1,688	70.54	705	29.46	9	2,402	3,739	64.24
Belize	Belize Rural Central	2,488	66.68	1,243	33.32	28	3,759	5,529	67.99
Belize	Belize Rural South	2,373	56.10	1,857	43.90	24	4,254	6,703	63.46
Corozal	Corozal Bay	1,220	47.99	1,322	52.006	17	2,559	4,104	62.35
Corozal	Corozal North	2,591	58.75	1,819	41.25	24	4,434	6,233	71.14
Corozal	Corozal South East	1,760	47.48	1,947	52.522	21	3,728	5,789	64.40
Corozal	Corozal South West	1,581	52.63	1,423	47.37	12	3,016	4,917	61.34
Orange Walk	Orange Walk Central	1,680	47.03	1,892	52.968	17	3,589	5,015	71.57
Orange Walk	Orange Walk North	1,893	46.97	2,137	53.027	28	4,058	6,505	62.38
Orange Walk	Orange Walk East	2,227	55.34	1,797	44.66	30	4,054	5,686	71.30
Orange Walk	Orange Walk South	1,960	51.46	1,849	48.54	34	3,843	6,054	63.48
Cayo	Cayo North	1,901	46.67	2,172	53.327	31	4,104	6,133	66.92
Cayo	Cayo Central	2,113	52.08	1,944	47.92	28	4,085	6,691	61.05
Cayo	Cayo West	1,584	45.77	1,877	54.233	39	3,500	5,355	65.36
Cayo	Cayo South	1,902	53.26	1,669	46.74	38	3,609	6,112	59.05
Cayo	Cayo North East	1,491	52.06	1,373	47.94	17	2,881	4,705	61.23
Cayo	Belmopan	2,692	56.95	2,035	43.05	21	4,748	7,214	65.82
Stann Creek	Dangriga	1,628	60.27	1,073	39.73	15	2,716	4,400	61.73
Stann Creek	Stann Creek West	2,520	53.78	2,166	46.22	33	4,719	7,611	62.00
Toledo	Toledo East	1,623	47.71	1,779	52.293	31	3,433	5,974	57.47
Toledo	Toledo West	1,692	45.51	2,026	54.492	25	3,743	6,188	60.49

== See also ==
- 1984 Argentine Beagle conflict dispute resolution referendum
- 2018 Guatemalan territorial dispute referendum
- 2023 Venezuelan referendum
