= Maya Forest =

Large rainforest in Central America

Maya Forest Spanish: Selva maya Mayan languages: Otoch k'aax^{g}
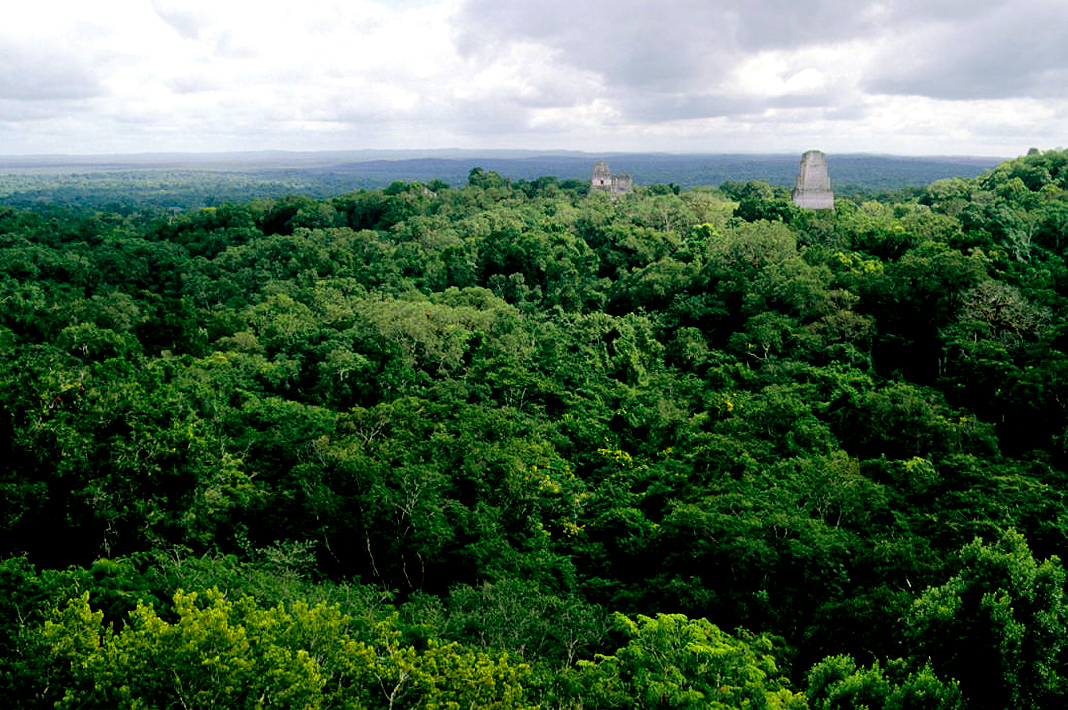
- Maya Forest encompassing Tikal / 2004 photograph by Luis Bartolomé Marcos / via Commons

- Location within Mesoamerica

Geography
- Location: Belize, northern Guatemala, southeastern Mexico^{a}
- Coordinates: 17°48′56″N 89°09′07″W^{b}
- Area: ca 15,000,000 ha (150,000 km^{2}) / total^{c} > 3,000,000 ha (30,000 km^{2}) / protected^{c}

Ecology
- WWF Classification: Petén–Veracruz moist forests^{d}
- Dominant tree species: Breadnut, sapodilla, cocoa, avocados, peppers, wild mamey, mylady, cohune, gumbolimbo, give-and-take, monkey apple, cabbage bark, dogwood, canistel, zapotillo, bayleaf, john crow redwood, hog plum, mahogany, Mayflower, guinep, walking lady, druken Bayman^{e}
- Fauna: Jaguar, scarlet macaw, Baird's tapir, Yucatan black howler monkey, white-lipped peccary, Hickatee turtle, hawksbill turtle, keel-billed toucan, harpy eagle, Yucatan brown brocket, ocellated turkey, Morelet's crocodile^{f}
- ^{a–g} Cf (Note: Infobox notes.^{Note a} Most commonly accepted extent per 'Extent' section of this article.^{Note b} Centroid of most commonly accepted extent.^{Note c} Area of protected and unprotected forest per GC 2021, quote after para. 3. Total area values range from 14,164,000 ha (141,640 km^{2}) (TNC 2020, para. 1) to 15,400,000 ha (154,000 km^{2}) (GC 2021, quote after para. 6). Protected area values range from 3,100,800 ha (31,008 km^{2}) (WCF 2019, para. 1) to 'exceeds four million hectares [40,000 sq km]' (WWF 2022, para. 1, SM 2017a, para. 1).^{Note d} Classification per WWF xx.^{Note e} Species per WCF 2019, para. 6, SM 2017a, para. 5, Bridgewater 2012, p. 41, and Hutson & Ardren 2020, p. 522.^{Note f} Species per WWF 2022, para. 3, WCF 2019, paras. 2, 6, TNC 2020, para. 1, SM 2017a, para. 5, GC 2021, para. 3, and Bridgewater 2012, p. 3.^{Note g} Name per Hutson & Ardren 2020, p. 525.)

The Maya Forest is a tropical moist broadleaf forest that covers much of the Yucatan Peninsula, thereby encompassing Belize, northern Guatemala, and southeastern Mexico. It is deemed the second largest tropical rainforest in the Americas, after the Amazon, with an area of circa 15 million hectares (150,000 km^{2}), of which at least 3 million (30,000 km^{2}) lies within protected areas.

== Extent ==
The Maya Forest is considered 'the [second] largest remaining tropical rainforest in the Americas,' after the Amazon. It is widely deemed to cover much of the Yucatan Peninsula, thereby encompassing Belize, northern Guatemala, and southeastern Mexico, and stretching across protected and unprotected areas, and Crown (ie public) and private lands. This coincides with the original definition of the Forest as developed in 1995 for internationally-coordinated conservation efforts, namely, the contiguous tropical rainforest which housed the Classic Maya civilisation within the Maya Lowlands. Some literature, however, restricts the Forest's bounds to only contiguous rainforest within protected areas (eg the Maya Biosphere Reserve and abutting protected areas). Other literature, though, extends the Forest's bounds beyond the Peninsula, suggesting it stretches along the Gulf of Mexico littoral beyond the Isthmus of Tehuantepec to the west, and along the Bay of Honduras littoral along northern Honduras to the east.

== History ==
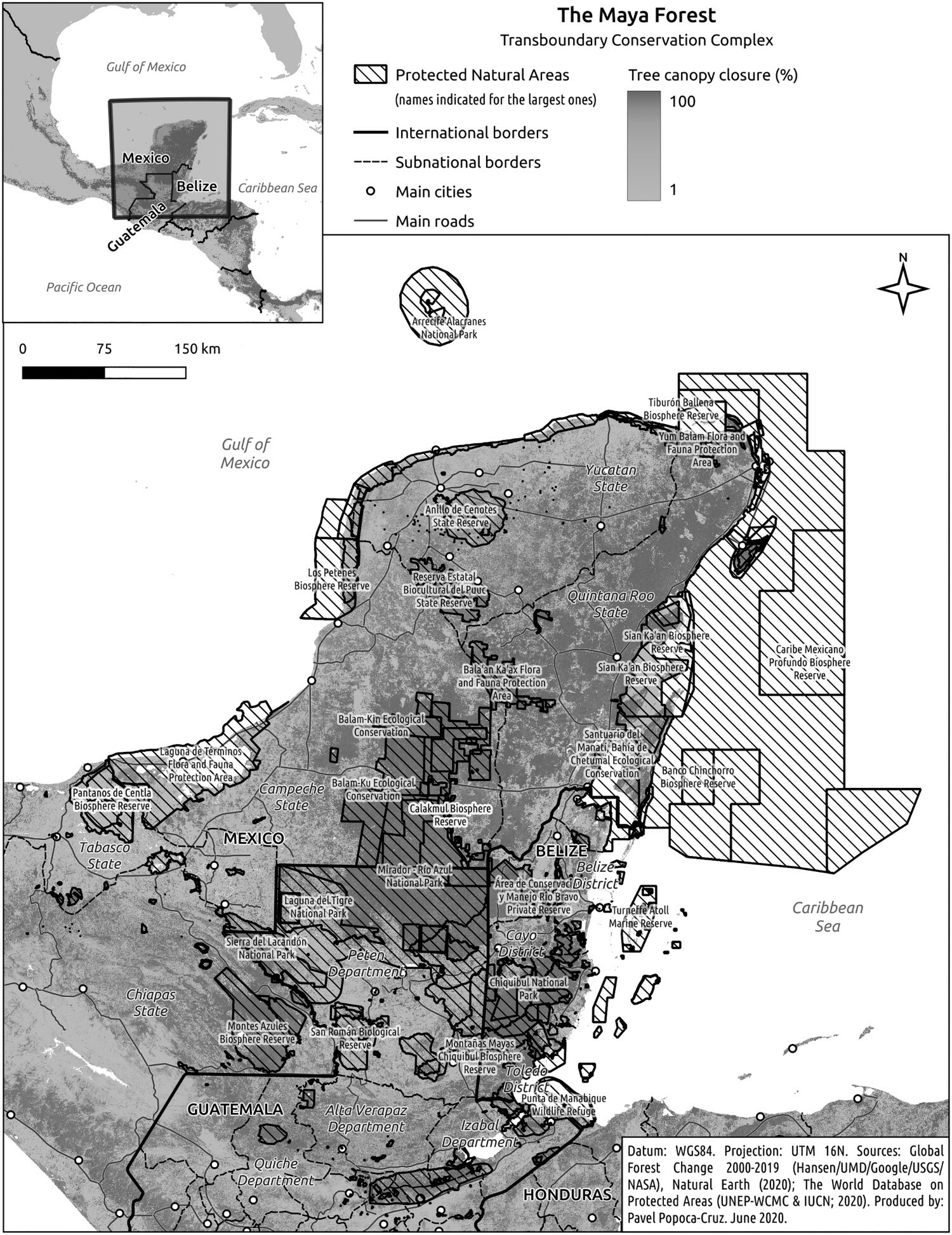
The Maya Forest / protected areas outlined / 2020 map by P. Popoca-Cruz / via Laako et al 2022

=== Pre-Columbian ===
The Maya Forest is thought to have come into being after the Last Glacial Maximum circa 20,000 years ago. Prior to such event, an arid climate is thought to have predominated in the Maya Lowlands, leading to dry, open savannahs, rather than a tropical rainforest. (Note: The closest tropical rainforest during the Last Glacial Maximum may have been in southern Central America (Bridgewater 2012, p. 55). During glacial minima, rainforests would have expanded, while savannahs would have contracted (Bridgewater 2012, pp. 55, 66).)

The earliest Palaeoindian settlers of the former Maya Lowlands would have encountered a burgeoning Maya Forest, and employed it to hunt and gather food, thereby leaving it largely intact. Their successors, the Maya, were once thought to have similarly kept the Forest in a largely virginal state, but scholarly consensus has flipped on this point. It is now thought that Preclassic or Classic Maya residents deforested large tracts of the Forest for residential and agricultural use, with recovery possible only after the Classic Maya Collapse.

=== Columbian ===
The Maya's successors, the Spanish in Guatemala and Mexico, and the Baymen in Belize, took to logging the Forest since their arrival during the conquest of Yucatan and later settlement of Belize and conquest of Peten. Though centuries of timber extraction may not have decimated the Forest, they did alter it, for instance, via selective extraction of logwood and mahogany.

Modern conservation efforts were begun in 1817 with the passage of the Crown Lands Ordinance, which regulated logging in the southeastern portion of the Forest, within British Honduran Crown lands. The earliest protected areas within the Forest are believed to have been the Silk Grass or Mountain Pine Ridge Forest Reserves, gazetted in 1920, both in the southeastern portion of the Forest, within British Honduras. Conservation efforts were not coordinated across state lines, however, until 1995, when a workshop to such end was held at the Colegio de la Frontera Sur in Campeche, Mexico, by the US Man and Biosphere Programme. (Note: Though international coordination was first suggested in the 1970s by the National Geographic via its coverage of an international 'Maya Route' (Laako et al. 2022, p. 1297). As of 2022, international conservation efforts include the GIZ-funded Selva Maya Programme (since 2000), the Mesoamerican Biological Corridor initiative (since 1990s), the Jaguar Corridor initiative, and the Belize-lead Maya Forest Corridor initiative (since 2019) (Laako et al. 2022, pp. 1302–1304).)

Presently, forest fires, illegal logging, illicit trafficking of flora and fauna, and intensive agriculture are thought to pose 'great threats' to the Forest. A recent study, for instance, found that twenty-first century deforestation has fragmented the Forest, thereby undermining its contiguity. It has been noted, furthermore, that mitigating said threats has proven challenging, given frosty diplomatic relations between Forest-holding states, most especially Belize and Guatemala.

== Geography ==
=== Physical ===
The Forest is a contiguous maze of woods with pockets of savannahs, wetlands, and coastal mangrove stands.

=== Human ===
As of the 2010s, the Forest houses a population of approximately 588,000 to 600,000 people in non-protected areas, including Maya, Garifuna, mestizo, and Mennonite residents. The Forest comprises various protected and unprotected tracts of woods, and itself constitutes the northernmost part of the Mesoamerican Biological Corridor.

Protected areas of the Maya Forest. (Note: Areas consisting of distinct protected sub-areas, or of protected and unprotected sub-areas, marked with an asterisk (*) in the Name column. Missing values marked with an en-dash (–).)
Name	Country	Established	Size	Notes
Belize Maya Forest	Belize	2021	96,000 ha (960 km^{2})	Cf
Rio Bravo	Belize	1995	102,790 ha (1,027.9 km^{2})	Cf (Note: Size given as 115,000 ha (1,150 km^{2}) in GC 2021, paras. 1-2. Establishment date given as 1980s in SM 2017b, sec. 'Belize' para. 6.)
Chiquibul	Belize	–	106,838 ha (1,068.38 km^{2})	Cf
Maya Golden Landscape*	Belize	–	311,608 ha (3,116.08 km^{2})	Cf (Note: Area comprising protected and unprotected sub-areas, including the Columbia River Forest Reserve (SM 2017b, sec. 'Belize' paras. 3-4).)
Vaca Forest	Belize	1930s	16,339 ha (163.39 km^{2})	Cf
Mountain Pine Ridge	Belize	1944	–	Cf
Maya Biosphere*	Guatemala	–	2,112,940 ha (21,129.4 km^{2})	Cf (Note: Area comprising protected and unprotected sub-areas, including the national parks of Mirador–Río Azul, Yaxha–Nakum–Naranjo, Tikal, Sierra del Lacandón, and Laguna del Tigre (SM 2017b, sec. 'Guatemala' paras. 1-19).)
Southern Peten*	Guatemala	–	411,379 ha (4,113.79 km^{2})	Cf (Note: Area comprising protected and unprotected sub-areas, including the Chiquibul–Maya Mountains Biosphere Reserve, Machaquilá–Xutilhá Wildlife Refuge, and San Román Biological Reserve (SM 2017b, sec. 'Guatemala' paras. 20-31).)
Calakmul Biosphere	Mexico	–	723,185 ha (7,231.85 km^{2})	Cf
Balam Kú	Mexico	–	409,200 ha (4,092 km^{2})	Cf
Balam Kin	Mexico	–	110,990 ha (1,109.9 km^{2})	Cf
Sian Ka'an Biosphere	Mexico	–	528,147 ha (5,281.47 km^{2})	Cf
Bala'an K'aax	Mexico	–	128,390 ha (1,283.9 km^{2})	Cf
Montes Azules	Mexico	1978	331,200 ha (3,312 km^{2})	Cf

== Ecology ==
The Maya Forest comprises more than 20 ecosystems. It is home to a wide range of animals, including jaguars, monkeys, parrots, tapirs, snakes and crocodiles. In 2025, Mexico, Guatemala and Belize announced an agreement to create a tri-national nature reserve to protect the forest.

== Legacy ==
The Forest has been deemed 'one of the most important ecological systems globally[, it being] considered the most extensive tropical forest in Mesoamerica[, with] a surface of protected areas that exceeds four million hectares [40,000 sq km].'

== See also ==
- Mesoamerican Biological Corridor, which encompasses the Maya Forest.

== Notes and references ==
=== Full citations ===
1. Bray, David Barton; Duran, Elvira; Ramos, Victor Hugo; Mas, Jean-Francois; Velazquez, Alejandro; McNab, Roan Balas; Barry, Deborah; Radachowsky, Jeremy (2008). "Tropical Deforestation, Community Forests, and Protected Areas in the Maya Forest". Ecology and Society. 13 (2): art. no. 56. ISSN 1708-3087.
2. Bridgewater, Samuel (2012). A Natural History of Belize. Corrie Herring Hooks Series no. 52. Austin, TX; London: University of Texas Press; Natural History Museum. doi:10.7560/726710. ISBN 9780292726710.
3. Cuba, Nicholas; Sauls, Laura A.; Bebbington, Anthony J.; Bebbington, Denise H.; Chicchon, Avecita; Marimón, Pilar D.; Diaz, Oscar; Hecht, Susanna; Kandel, Susan; Osborne, Tracey; Ray, Rebecca; Rivera, Madelyn; Rogan, John; Zalles, Viviana (2022). "Emerging hot spot analysis to indicate forest conservation priorities and efficacy on regional to continental scales: a study of forest change in Selva Maya 2000–2020" (PDF). Environmental Research Communications. 4 (7): art. no. 071004. doi:10.1088/2515-7620/ac82de.
4. Ford, Anabel; Nigh, Ronald (2009). "Origins of the Maya Forest Garden: Maya Resource Management". Journal of Ethnobiology. 29 (2): 213–236. doi:10.2993/0278-0771-29.2.213.
5. GC (2021). "Greater Belize Maya Forest". Global Conservation. San Francisco, CA: Global Conservation. Archived from the original on 7 June 2023.
6. Hutson, Scott R.; Ardren, Traci, eds. (2020). The Maya World. Routledge Worlds. London and New York: Routledge. ISBN 9781351029582. OCLC 1159169707.
7. Laako, Hanna; Pliego Alvarado, Esmeralda; Ramos Muñoz, Dora; Marquez, Beula (2022). "Transboundary conservation and nature states in the Maya Forest: International Relations, challenged". Globalizations. 19 (8): 1288–1310. doi:10.1080/14747731.2022.2062844.
8. SM (2017a). "The Tropical Forest". Selva Maya. Guatemala City: Selva Maya Programme. Archived from the original on 3 May 2023.
9. SM (2017b). "Protected Areas". Selva Maya. Guatemala City: Selva Maya Programme. Archived from the original on 6 August 2023.
10. TNC (2020). "Maya Forest". The Nature Conservancy. Arlington, VA: The Nature Conservancy. Archived from the original on 30 March 2023.
11. WCF (2019). "Selva Maya". The 5 Great Forests Initiative. Bronx, NY: Wildlife Conservation Society. Archived from the original on 26 July 2023.
12. WWF (2022). "Maya Forest". WWF. Gland, Switzerland: World Wide Fund For Nature. Archived from the original on 28 March 2023.
