= Belize–Guatemala relations =

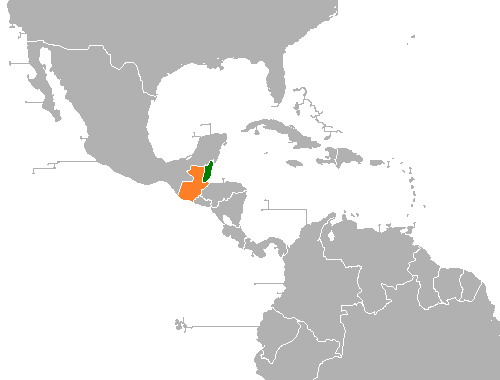

- Belize: Guatemala

The nations of Belize and Guatemala established diplomatic relations in 1991, ten years after Belizean independence. The two countries have had a long-standing dispute over the territory of Belize. Both nations are members of the Association of Caribbean States, Central American Integration System, Community of Latin American and Caribbean States, Organization of American States and the United Nations.

== History ==
In September 1981 Belize obtained its independence from the United Kingdom. Since its independence, relations between Belize and Guatemala have been tense due to an unresolved territorial dispute going back since the UK governed then British Honduras (present-day Belize). In August 1991, Guatemalan President Jorge Serrano Elías officially recognized Belize as an independent country, and stated his willingness to settle the dispute between both nations; however, President Serrano Elías did not drop the territorial dispute claims which continue to persist.

In September 1991, both nations established diplomatic relations. Belize soon accepted an ambassador from Guatemala; however, the Guatemalan government did not accredit the first ambassador from Belize until December 1996.

Under Guatemala President Álvaro Arzú, his administration tried resolving the dispute with Belize, making it the number one priority. In early 1996, the Guatemalan Congress ratified two long-pending international agreements governing frontier issues and maritime rights. In 2000, Belizean Prime Minister Said Musa paid a visit to Guatemala to attend the inauguration of President Alfonso Portillo.

In 2018, Guatemala held a territorial dispute referendum where 95% of voters voted yes. A year later, Belize also held a territorial dispute referendum where 55% of voters voted yes. As a result, in 2020 Guatemala took the case of territorial dispute to the International Court of Justice in The Hague. Both countries continue to wait for a ruling.

In December 2023 President-elect Bernardo Arévalo paid a visit to Belize and met with Prime Minister Johnny Briceño. In January 2024 Prime Minister Briceño traveled to Guatemala to attend President Arévalo's inauguration.

In August 2024, Belizean Prime Minister Johnny Briceño traveled to Guatemala and met with President Bernardo Arévalo. In August 2025, Prime Minister Briceño and President Arévalo met again along with Mexican President Claudia Sheinbaum in Calakmul, Mexico. The three leaders announced the creation of a tri-national nature reserve to protect the Mayan rainforest. They also discussed bringing Mexico's Tren Maya to both Belize and Guatemala.

== High-level visits ==
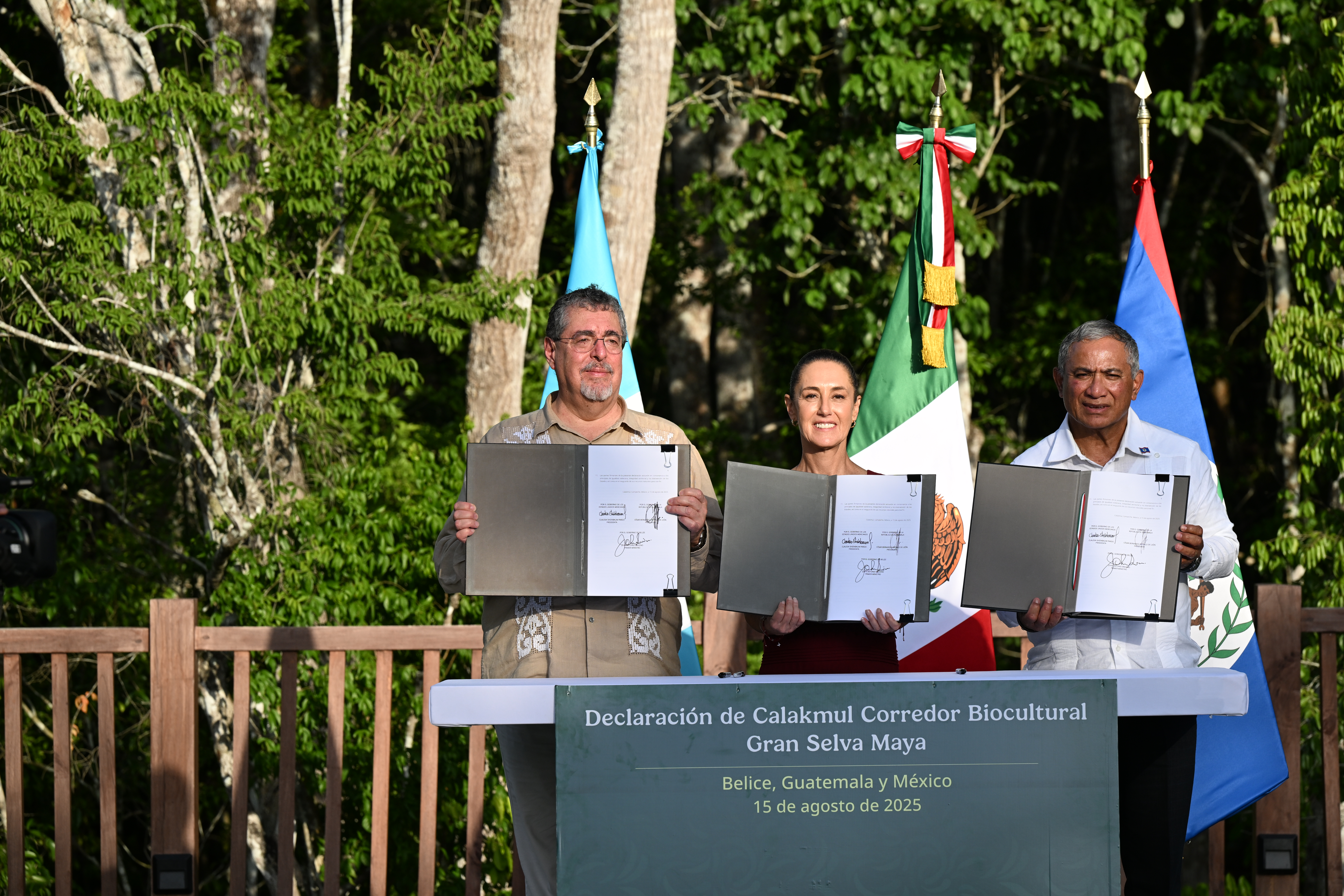
Guatemalan President Bernardo Arévalo, Mexican President Claudia Sheinbaum and Belizean Prime Minister Johnny Briceño in Calakmul, Mexico; August 2025.

High-level visits from Belize to Guatemala

- Foreign Minister Said Musa (1991)
- Prime Minister Said Musa (2000)
- Prime Minister Dean Barrow (2016)
- Prime Minister Johnny Briceño (January and August 2024)

High-level visits from Guatemala to Belize

- Foreign Minister Fernando Carrera (2014)
- President-elect Bernardo Arévalo (2023)

== Transportation ==
There are direct flights between both nations with Transportes Aéreos Guatemaltecos.

== Bilateral agreements ==
Both nations have signed a few bilateral agreements such as an Agreement for Preferred Tariffs (2006); Agreement of Protection, Conservation, Recovery and Return of Items of Cultural and Natural Patrimony Which Have Been Stolen, Pilfered, Looted, Exported or Trafficked Unlawfully (2014); Agreement for Expedited Deportation (2014); Agreement for an Equivalence of Studies and the Recognition of Educational Documents (2014); Agreement for Seasonal Workers Program (2014); Agreement of Cooperation on Sustainable Tourism (2014); Agreement of the Transfer of Prisoners for Serving of Penal Sentences (2014); and an Agreement to create the Biocultural Corridor of the Great Mayan Forest (2025).

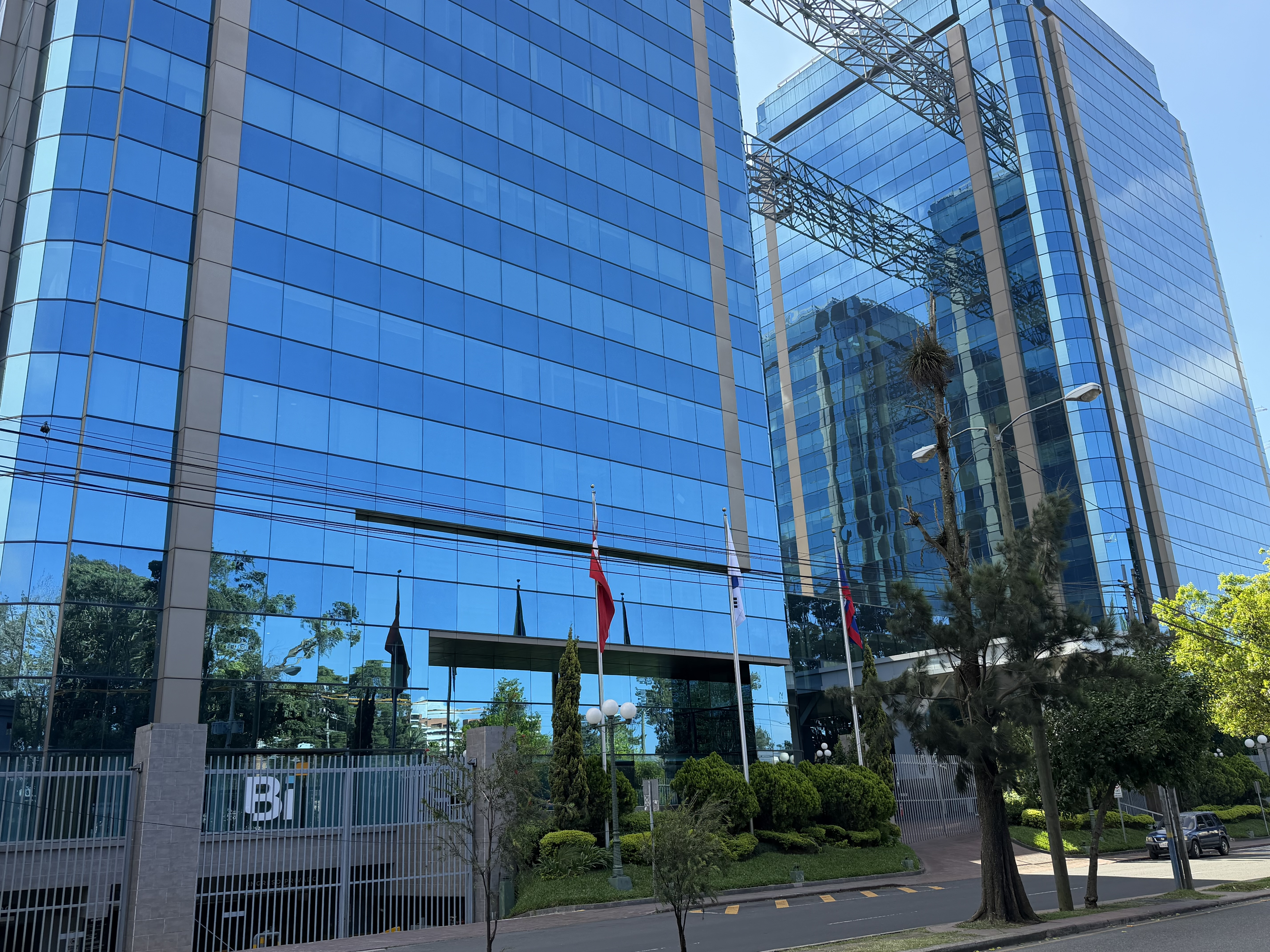
Building hosting the Embassy of Belize in Guatemala City

== Resident diplomatic missions ==
- Belize has an embassy in Guatemala City.
- Guatemala has an embassy in Belize City and a consulate-general in Benque Viejo del Carmen.

== See also ==
- Belize–Guatemala border
- Belizean–Guatemalan territorial dispute
- Foreign relations of Belize
- Foreign relations of Guatemala
