= Sarstoon Island =

Belizean island in the Sarstún River

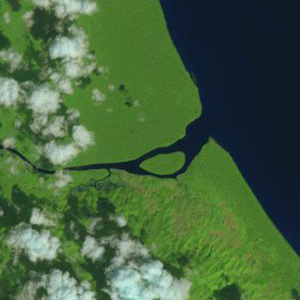
- Satellite image of Sarstoon Island taken by Landsat 8
- Interactive map of Sarstoon Island

Geography
- Location: Sarstoon River
- Coordinates: 15.8910°N 88.9247°W
- Area: 0.68 km^{2} (0.26 sq mi)

Administration
- Belize
- District: Toledo

Demographics
- Population: uninhabited

Sarstoon Island is an island at the southernmost point of Belize located near the mouth of the Sarstoon River. The main channel of Sarstoon River is located south of Sarstoon Island and forms part of the Belize–Guatemala border. Sarstoon Island is part of the Toledo District of Belize, which is one of 6 districts of the country. The island is mostly mangrove swampland and is uninhabited. It covers approximately 0.68 square kilometres (0.26 mi^{2}).

Sarstoon Island has been a focal point of the Belizean–Guatemalan territorial dispute, with Guatemala recently making claims to the island. Guatemalan Armed Forces (GAF) routinely patrol the waters of Sarstoon Island and illegally enter Belizean waters while preventing Belizean civilians from freely traversing the area belonging to Belize. There have been various incidents like these in recent years from 2015 to present, especially documented by the Belize Territorial Volunteers and leader Wil Maheia.

According to the Wyke-Aycinena Treaty of 1859, "any islands which may be found [within the Sarstoon River] shall belong to that Party on whose side of the main navigable channel they are situated." In 1860, commissioners for British Honduras (now Belize) and Guatemala surveyed the Sarstoon River and found that the river's current predominantly passed to the south of the island, making Sarstoon Island part of the territory of British Honduras. A map was drawn up from the survey results showing the boundary running along the southern channel. Both commissioners signed the map on May 13, 1861, certifying that the boundaries shown on it were correct. Guatemala later terminated the agreement, arguing that the United Kingdom had failed to live up to the conditions of the treaty.

In 2015, the government of Belize announced its intentions to build a forward operating base for the Belize Coast Guard on Sarstoon Island. Due to logistical concerns, however, the government decided to build the base on the mainland instead.
