= Sarstoon-Temash National Park =

National park of Belize

- Temash-Sarstoon National Park
- IUCN category II (national park)
- Location within Belize
- Location: Toledo District, Belize
- Coordinates: 15°58′N 89°00′W
- Area: 165.92 km^{2} (64.06 sq mi)
- Designation: National park
- Designated: 1994
- Governing body: Forest Department/Sarstoon-Temash Institute for Indigenous Management

Ramsar Wetland
- Official name: Sarstoon Temash National Park
- Designated: 19 October 2005
- Reference no.: 1562

Sarstoon-Temash is the southernmost national park in Belize. The national park was designated in 1994, and covers an area of 165.92 km^{2}. It is managed by the Sarstoon Temash Institute for Indigenous Management (SATIIM), in partnership with the Forest Department.

== Geography ==
The park is bounded on the south by the Sarstoon River, which forms the border with Guatemala. The lower Temash River runs through the park. It is bounded on the east by the Caribbean Sea.

== Flora and fauna ==
The park includes a variety of habitat types. Seasonally and permanently flooded tropical forests predominate, which are part of the Petén–Veracruz moist forests ecoregion. Wetland habitats include 1,100 hectares of freshwater sphagnum moss bog, which are distinct in the region, and the Belize's only stands of comfra palm (Manicaria saccifera). The park also includes a brackish-to-saline inland lagoon, which forms a transition between the freshwater wetlands and 9,600 hectares of saline mangrove swamps. The mangrove swamps are Belize's largest and least-disturbed stand of red mangrove (Rhizophora mangle).

The park is home to several threatened and vulnerable species of animals, including the black howler monkey (Alouatta caraya), hickatee turtle (Dermatemys mawii), Baird's tapir (Tapirus bairdii), West Indian manatee (Trichechus manatus), and Morelet's crocodile (Crocodylus moreletii).

== People ==
The indigenous Kekchi Maya and Garifuna people live in the park's buffer zone, and both peoples attach cultural importance to areas of the park.

== Conservation and threats ==
The park is jointly managed by the Sarstoon Temash Institute for Indigenous Management (SATIIM) and Belize's forest department. The park was designated a wetlands of international importance under the Ramsar Convention in 2005.

Threats to the park include illegal logging of valuable mahogany, cedar, and rosewood timber.
