= 1984 Argentine Beagle conflict dispute resolution referendum =

- 25 November 1984
- Conformity (or disconformity) of the citizen with the terms of the conclusion of the negotiations with the Republic of Chile to resolve the dispute concerning the area of the Beagle Channel.
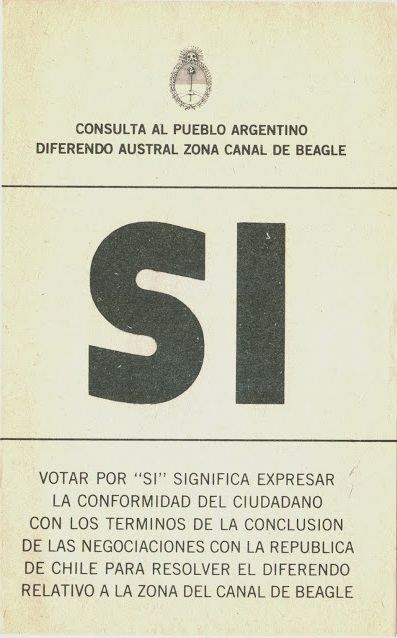
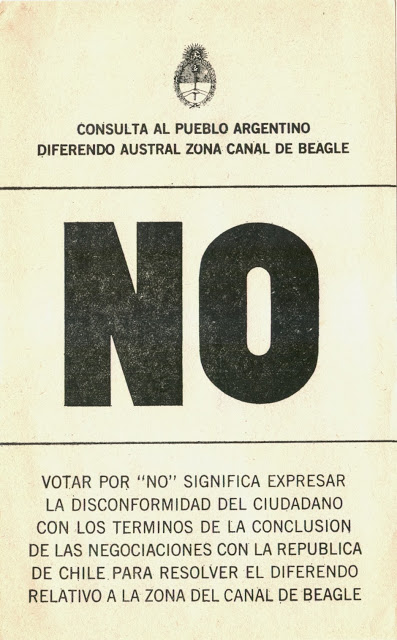
- Ballots used in the referendum.

Results
Choice	Votes	%
Yes	10,454,172	82.60%
No	2,201,963	17.40%
Valid votes	12,656,135	98.40%
Invalid or blank votes	205,220	1.60%
Total votes	12,861,355	100.00%
Registered voters/turnout	18,350,863	70.09%
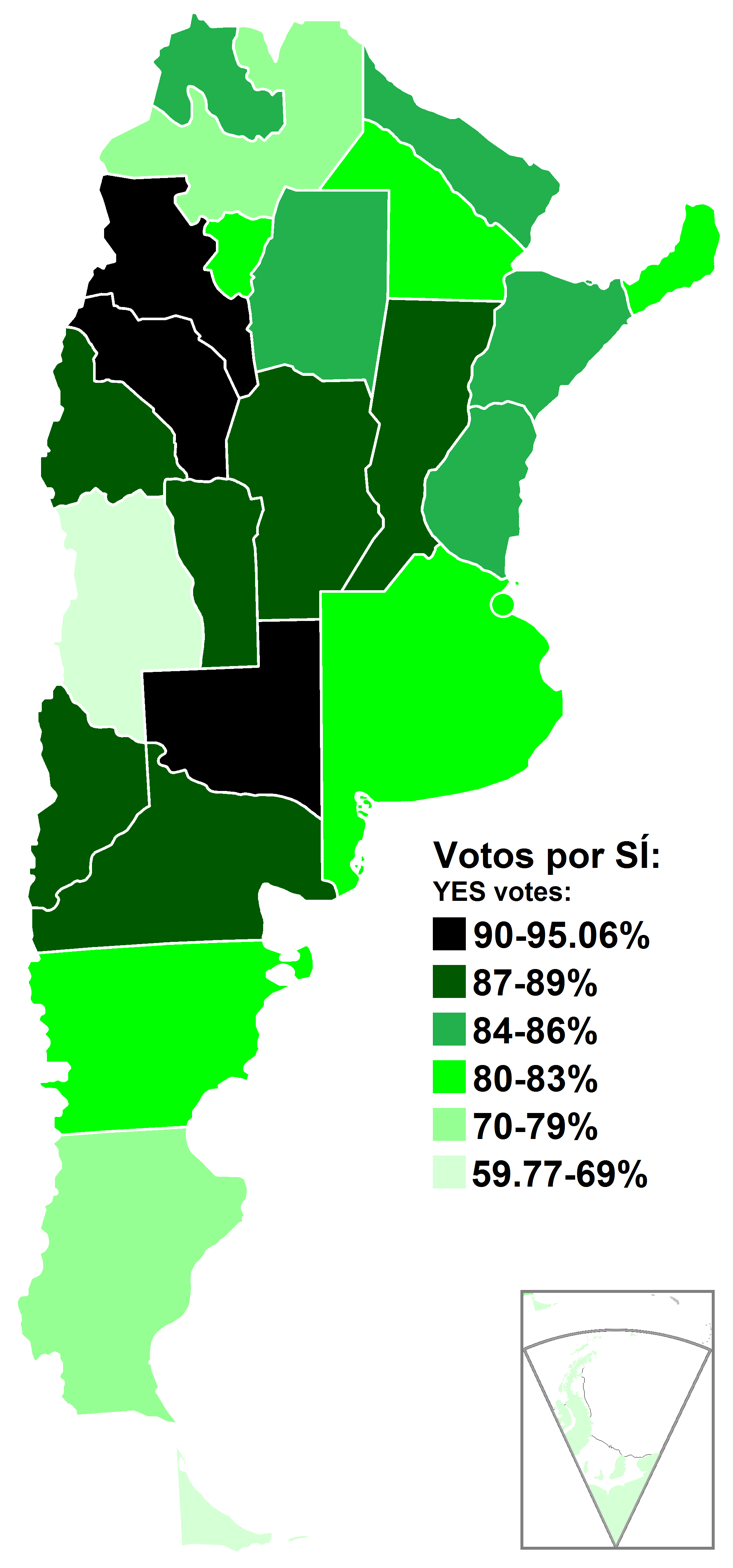
- Percentage of "Yes" votes by province

A non-binding referendum on resolving the Beagle conflict was held in Argentina on 25 November 1984. Voters were asked whether they approved of the government's negotiated settlement with Chile, which would result in Argentina recognising the Picton, Lennox and Nueva islands as being Chilean territory. Although the plebiscite was not binding, President Raúl Alfonsín declared that he would respect the outcome of the vote. The proposal was approved by 82.6% of voters, with a turnout of 70%.

== Background ==
The ruling party, the Radical Civic Union, called for a vote in favor of the settlement. The opposition, headed by the Justicialist Party, boycotted the process, claiming that it distracted from economic problems. Some opponents, including Herminio Iglesias, called for voters to participate in the referendum and vote against. In contrast, other leaders like Carlos Menem came out in favour of the settlement. The right-wing, including military groups that ruled Argentina between 1976 and 1983, were also against the settlement.

== Results ==
Choice	Votes	%
For	10,454,172	82.60
Against	2,201,963	17.40
Total	12,656,135	100.00
Valid votes	12,656,135	98.40
Invalid votes	64,099	0.50
Blank votes	141,121	1.10
Total votes	12,861,355	100.00
Registered voters/turnout	18,350,863	70.09
Source: Dirección Nacional Electoral

=== By province ===
Province	Yes		No		Invalid/ blank	Total	Registered voters	Turnout
Province	Votes	%	Votes	%	Invalid/ blank	Total	Registered voters	Turnout
Buenos Aires	4,237,251	80.94	997,831	19.06	76,303	5,311,385	6,758,336	78.59
Buenos Aires City	1,311,387	81.67	294,281	18.33	22,209	1,627,877	2,418,933	67.30
Catamarca	64,041	95.06	3,330	4.94	794	68,165	133,814	50.94
Chaco	220,716	83.13	44,793	16.87	5,028	270,537	408,058	66.30
Chubut	93,833	83.04	19,170	16.96	1,255	114,258	158,863	71.92
Córdoba	1,027,223	88.80	129,599	11.20	22,804	1,179,626	1,669,715	70.65
Corrientes	232,864	85.08	40,840	14.92	3,949	277,653	448,418	61.92
Entre Ríos	345,970	86.85	52,402	13.15	11,034	409,406	623,297	65.68
Formosa	88,604	86.91	13,342	13.09	1,892	103,838	170,978	70.73
Jujuy	99,385	84.25	18,575	15.75	2,146	120,106	225,743	53.20
La Pampa	84,148	94.56	4,837	5.44	1,668	90,653	149,557	60.61
La Rioja	31,486	90.44	3,329	9.56	434	35,249	42,861	82.24
Mendoza	376,821	66.72	187,999	33.28	8,592	573,412	768,608	74.60
Misiones	191,828	83.68	37,413	16.32	5,806	235,047	336,376	69.88
Neuquén	96,282	87.56	13,682	12.44	1,224	111,188	147,090	75.59
Río Negro	132,203	87.46	18,960	12.54	2,686	153,849	209,082	73.58
Salta	193,894	75.25	63,785	24.75	4,061	261,740	403,441	64.88
San Juan	162,886	89.11	19,906	10.89	2,193	184,985	292,777	63.18
San Luis	85,514	89.43	10,105	10.57	1,273	96,892	151,486	63.96
Santa Cruz	30,232	78.21	8,422	21.79	372	39,026	56,018	69.67
Santa Fe	901,943	87.22	132,142	12.78	20,341	1,054,426	1,721,825	61.24
Santiago del Estero	137,491	86.69	21,106	13.31	3,512	162,109	402,003	40.33
Tierra del Fuego	9,682	59.77	6,516	40.23	150	16,348	20,685	79.03
Tucumán	298,488	83.36	59,598	16.64	5,494	363,580	632,899	57.45
Total	10,454,172	82.60	2,201,963	17.40	205,220	12,861,355	18,350,863	70.09

== Aftermath ==
Despite the overwhelming support from voters, the Argentine National Congress only approved the treaty on 14 March 1985 by a vote of 23–22, with one abstention.

== See also ==
- 2018 Guatemalan territorial dispute referendum
- 2019 Belizean territorial dispute referendum
- 2023 Venezuelan referendum
