= Bullet Tree Falls =

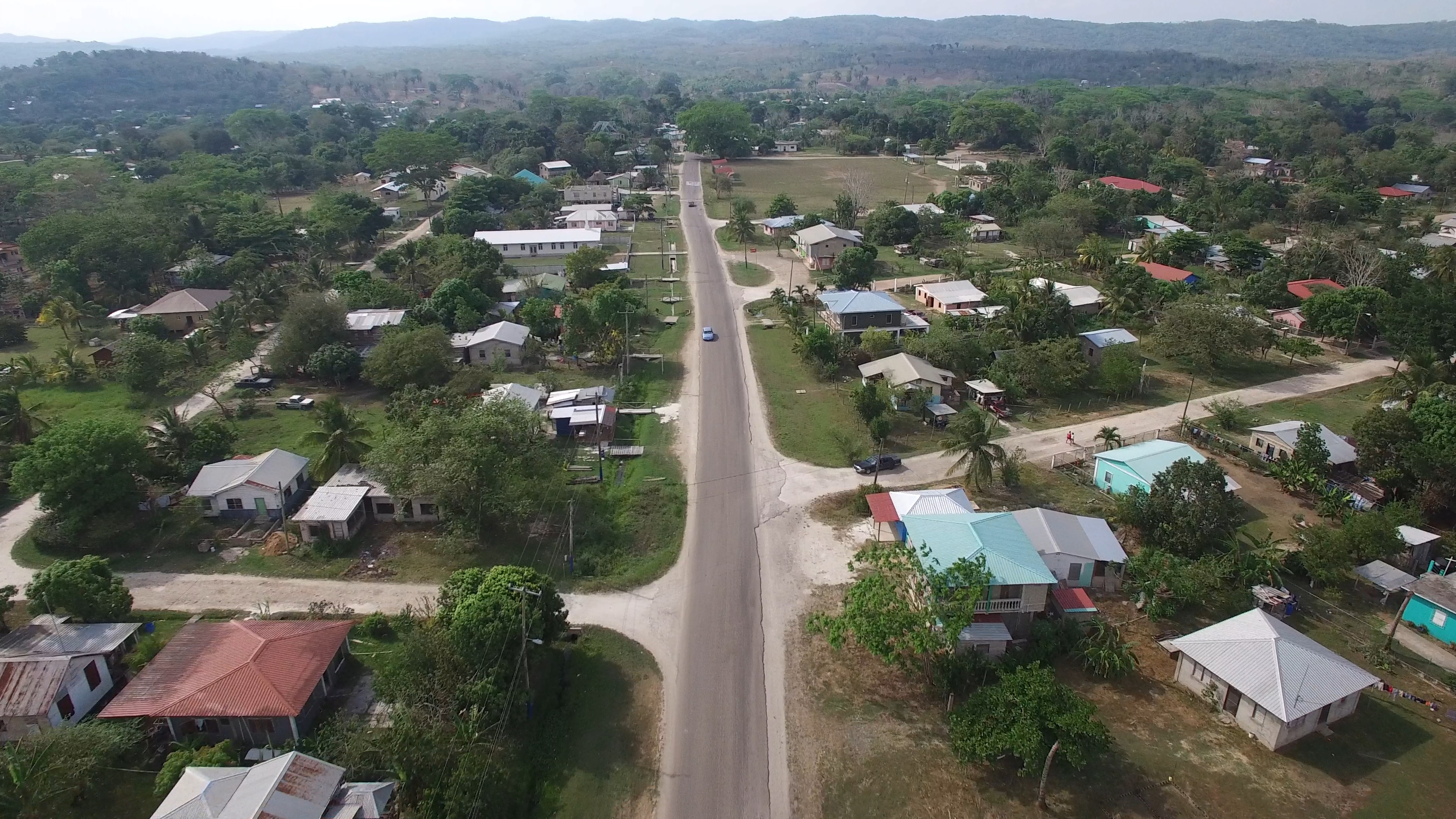
- Aerial view of the main road in Bullet Tree Falls

- Location within Belize
- Coordinates: 17.168°N 89.111°W
- Country: Belize
- District: Cayo District
- Constituency: Cayo North
- Elevation: 69 m (226 ft)

Population (2010)
  - Total: 2,124
- Time zone: UTC-6 (Central)
- Climate: Am

Bullet Tree Falls is a village located along the Mopan River in Cayo District, Belize. It lies approximately five kilometers (three miles) northwest of San Ignacio. According to the 2010 census, Bullet Tree Falls has a population of 2,124 people in 426 households. The population consists mainly of Spanish-speaking mestizos, along with a smaller number of Maya and Creoles. The village is governed by a seven-person village council.

Bullet Tree Falls

== Demographics ==
At the time of the 2010 census, Bullet Tree Falls had a population of 2,124. Of these, 91.0% were Mestizo, 3.4% Mixed, 1.1% Creole, 1.0% Yucatec Maya, 0.9% Caucasian, 0.8% Mopan Maya, 0.7% Ketchi Maya, 0.3% East Indian and 0.1% Mennonite.

== History ==
Bullet Tree Falls was first established as a small logging camp in the 1800s. During the Caste War of Yucatán, many Maya families migrated to Bullet Tree Falls from villages further north such as El Chorro and Yaloch. By 1917, there were approximately one hundred and forty people living in the village in twenty-three households. During the early and mid 20th century, an influx of mestizos migrated to the village from Guatemala and Mexico, many of them working as chicleros. During the early days of the chicle and timber industries in Belize, the village was an important trading post.

The first Creoles settled in Bullet Tree Falls in the 1950s, arriving from San Ignacio. In 1961, Hurricane Hattie caused significant damage to the village, destroying a school building and church. During the 1960s and 1970s, several Mopan Maya families moved to Bullet Tree Falls from the Toledo District. By 1970, the population of the village had grown to approximately 700. In 1988, the Salvador Fernandez Bridge was completed, replacing an older wooden bridge.

== Attractions ==
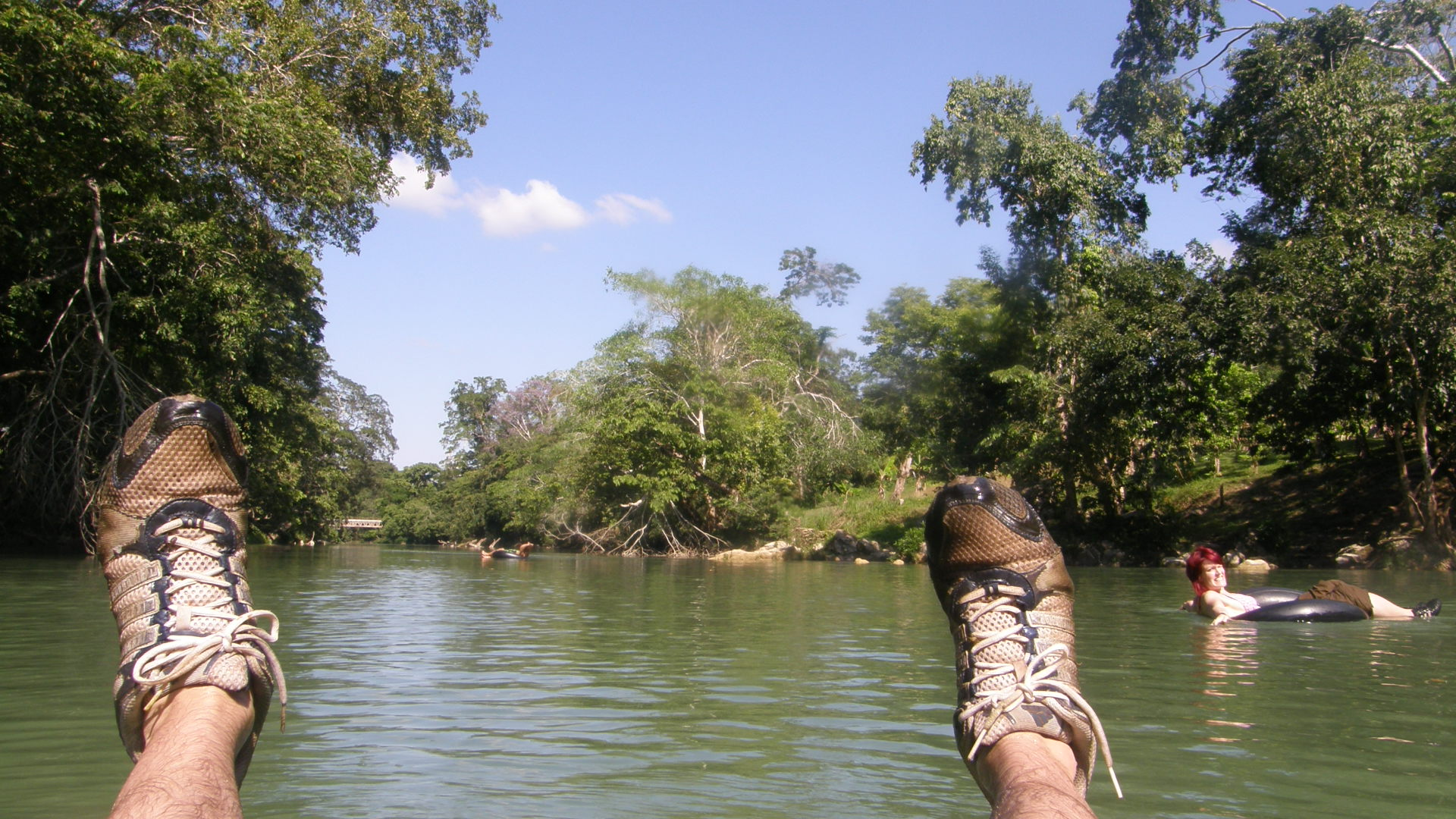
Tubing down the Mopan River is a popular tourist activity in Bullet Tree Falls.

Bullet Tree Falls has developed a small tourist economy facilitated by its location between San Ignacio and the El Pilar Maya archeological site. The village hosts several lodges and a small botanical garden. Buses between Bullet Tree Falls and San Ignacio run several times a day and taxi service is available to San Ignacio and El Pilar.

== Gallery ==
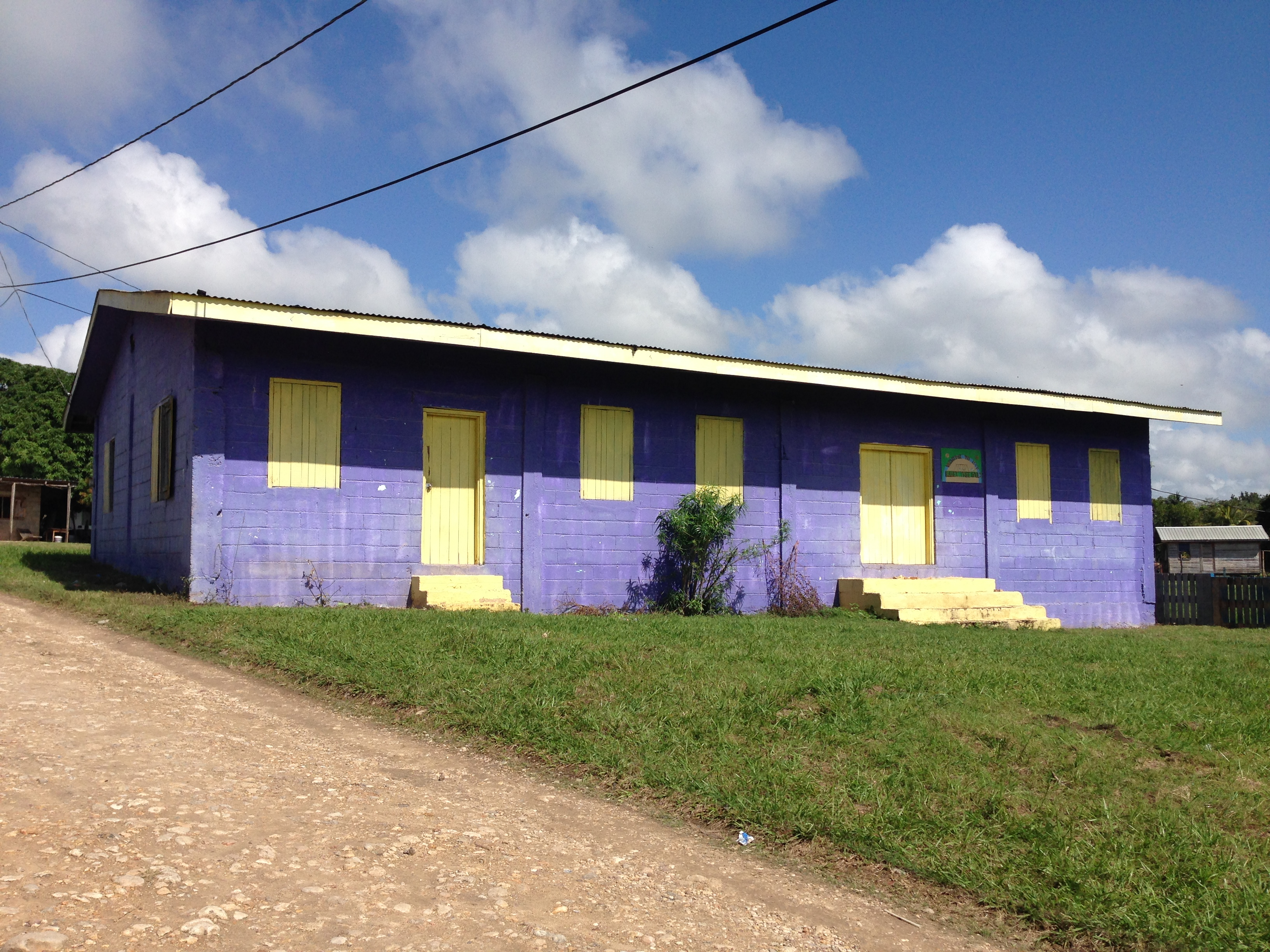
The Community Center

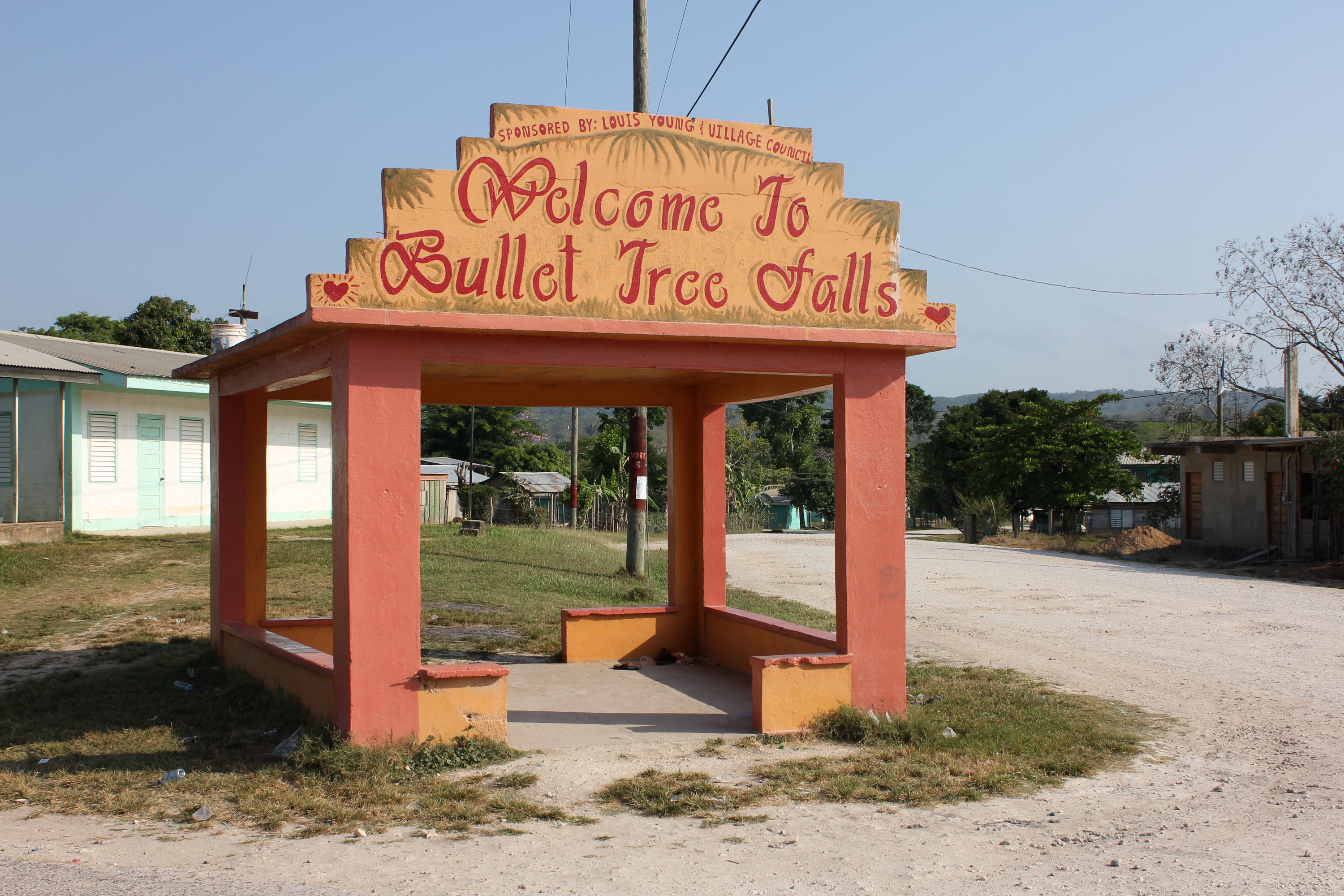
The main bus stop

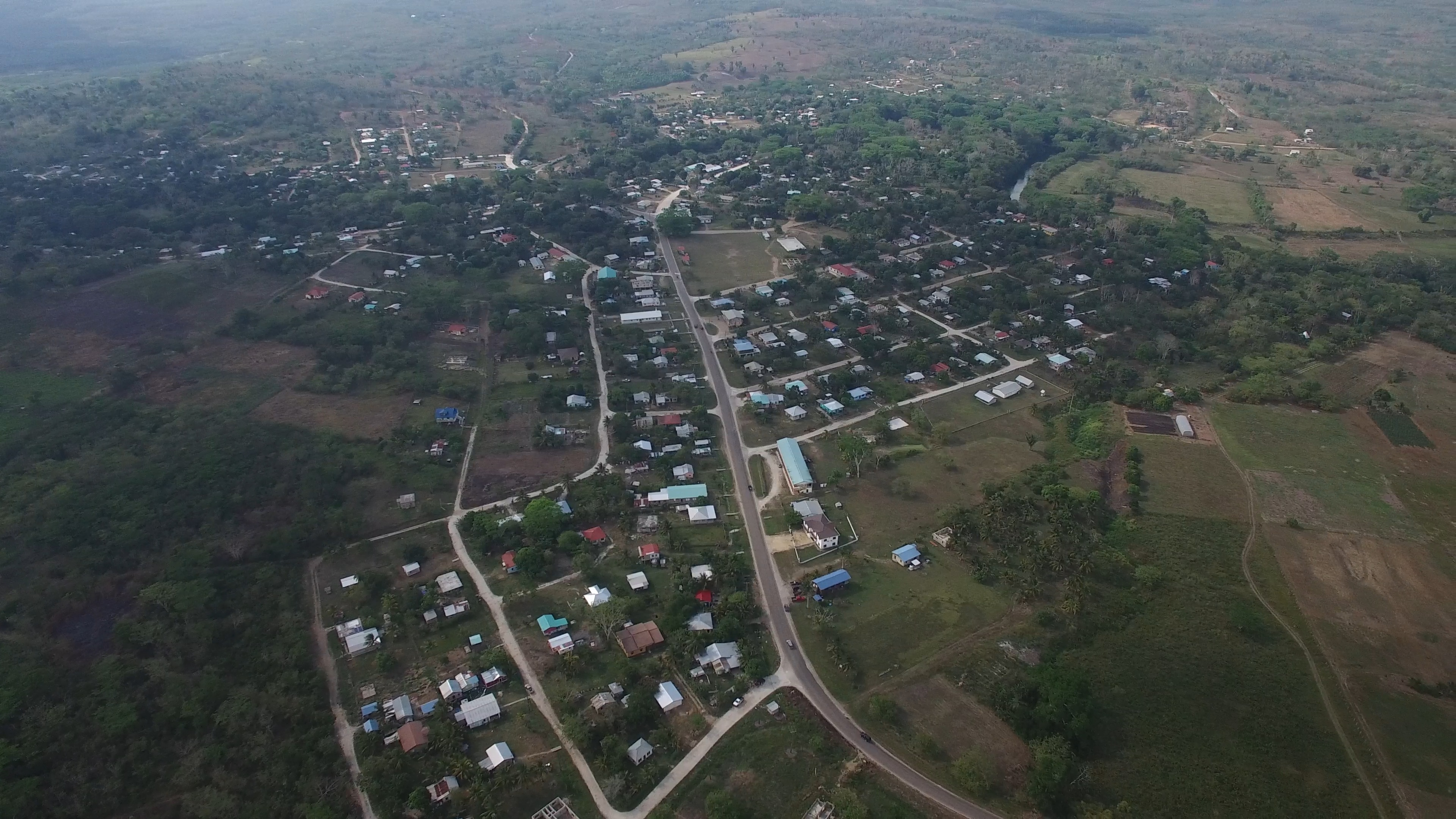
Aerial view of the village

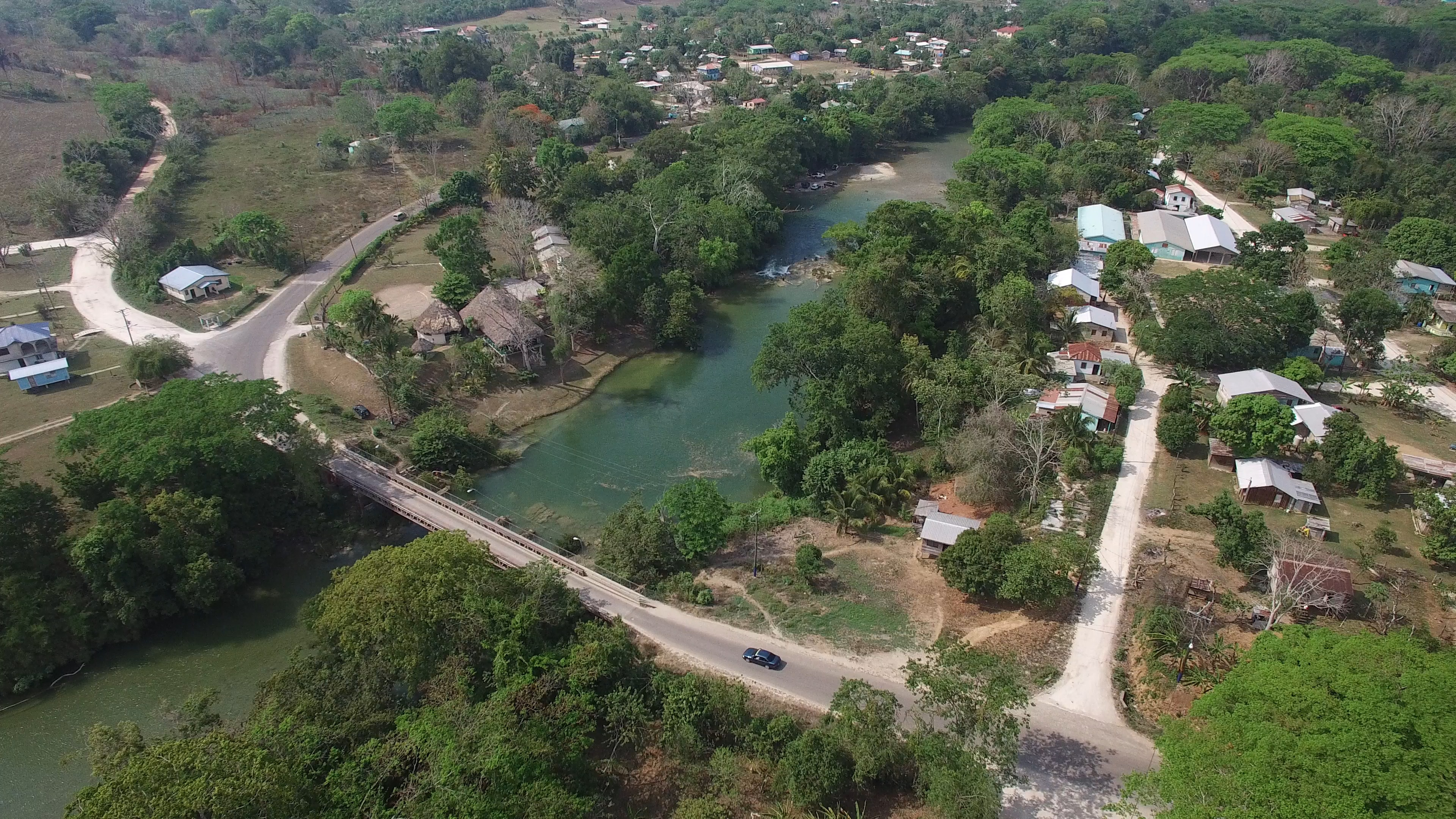
The Salvador Fernandez Bridge and Mopan River
