= Belizean–Guatemalan territorial dispute =

Border dispute in Central America

Map of Belize and Guatemala showing disputed territory.

A territorial dispute exists between the two Central American countries of Belize and Guatemala. In the latter half of the 1600s and all through the 1700s, there were many treaties made between the countries of Britain and Spain about territories in the Americas. It had been decided that the territory of Belize was a part of Spanish territory but the British people could make use of the land, certain areas only and for particular purposes. The region was never completely under the control of either the British or the Spanish at that point of time, and the British had continually trespassed the limits imposed on them by the treaties. Once the Spanish Empire collapsed, Guatemala declared that it had the sovereign rights of Spain to that territory.

Guatemala and Britain negotiated the Wyke-Aycinena Treaty in 1859 regarding the disputed area. The treaty stated that Guatemala would recognise British sovereignty over the region and formed the modern-day boundary lines of Belize. The treaty also had an article about building a mutually beneficial road, though it was never built. Shortly after this treaty the territory became a crown colony under British rule as British Honduras.

Throughout the 20th century, tensions flared up intermittently between Guatemala and British Honduras. A series of notes in 1931 were exchanged between Guatemala and the UK, confirming concrete markers implementing part of the 1859 border lines, showing that the treaty was being upheld by both parties at this point. Less than 10 years later, Guatemala renewed its claims on the area, using the broken promise of the road as justification for the 1859 treaty to be void. Britain stationed troops in British Honduras to secure the region against Guatemalan invasion and many negotiations attempting to resolve the dispute took place over the following decades. Belize and the British pursued a path to independence, eventually culminating in the United Nations passing a resolution to guarantee Belizean independence. In an attempt to settle the dispute before Belize's official independence in 1981, Guatemala, the UK, and Belize negotiated the Heads of Agreement treaty. The treaty was vehemently rejected by the Belizean people, to the point of causing a state of emergency.

The border dispute has been quieter since Belize's independence. Guatemala eventually recognised the independence of Belize in the early 1990s. In 1999, however, Guatemala shifted its stance back to inheriting claims from the Spanish Empire and the Federal Republic of Central America. Guatemala and Belize both stationed troops at the border, with a one-kilometre "adjacency zone" drawn on either side of the 1859 treaty borders. In 2008, Guatemala and Belize made a pact to have simultaneous referendums for their voters to send the issue to the International Court of Justice. The referendums passed in both countries by May 2019. In June 2023, both countries have submitted their final written arguments to the International Court of Justice, with oral arguments beginning in November 2025.

== History ==
=== Early colonial era (1600s–1821) ===
In 1494, Spain and Portugal agreed to the Treaty of Tordesillas, dividing the newly discovered American lands along a meridian, with Spain claiming the territories to its west. However, England, like many other powers of the late 15th century, did not recognize the treaty. After Mayan tribes had massacred Spanish conquistadors and missionaries in Tipu and surrounding areas, shipwrecked English seamen, then English and Scottish Baymen, settled by 1638, with a short military alliance with native residents of the Mosquito Coast south of Belize, and often welcoming former British privateers.

In the Godolphin Treaty of 1670, Spain confirmed England was to hold all territories in the Western Hemisphere that it had already settled. However, the treaty did not specify which areas were considered settled. English settlers were already in the territory when the treaty was signed, but was not exclusively under British control either, which gave room for Spain to claim sovereignty over the region.

Without recognition of either the British or Spanish governments, the Baymen in Belize started electing magistrates as early as 1738. When the Treaty of Paris was signed in 1763, Britain agreed to demolish British forts in the region and gave Spain sovereignty over the soil, while Spain agreed the Baymen could continue logging wood in the territory. From this treaty until 1859, the territory is now formally referred to as the British Settlement of Belize in the Bay of Honduras, sometimes shortened to "the Bay of Honduras". The 1783 Treaty of Versailles marked where the Baymen could log between the Hondo and Belize rivers. The 1786 Anglo-Spanish Convention was signed to extend the logging border down to the Sibun river and the ability to settle in the nearby St. George's Caye as long as no forts were built and no troops were on the island. All of the aforementioned treaties also specified that the territory could be used only for logging and scavenging within the areas outlined, that Spanish sovereignty still existed in the region and that local government was only to be established for maintaining peace, not for civil nor military purposes.

Spain had several skirmishes with the Baymen, even after the 1786 convention. Spain's last military attempt to dislodge the settlers was the 1798 Battle of St. George's Caye, where Spain failed to capture any land. Regular censuses of the settlement were conducted in 1816.

=== Late colonial era (1821–1930s) ===
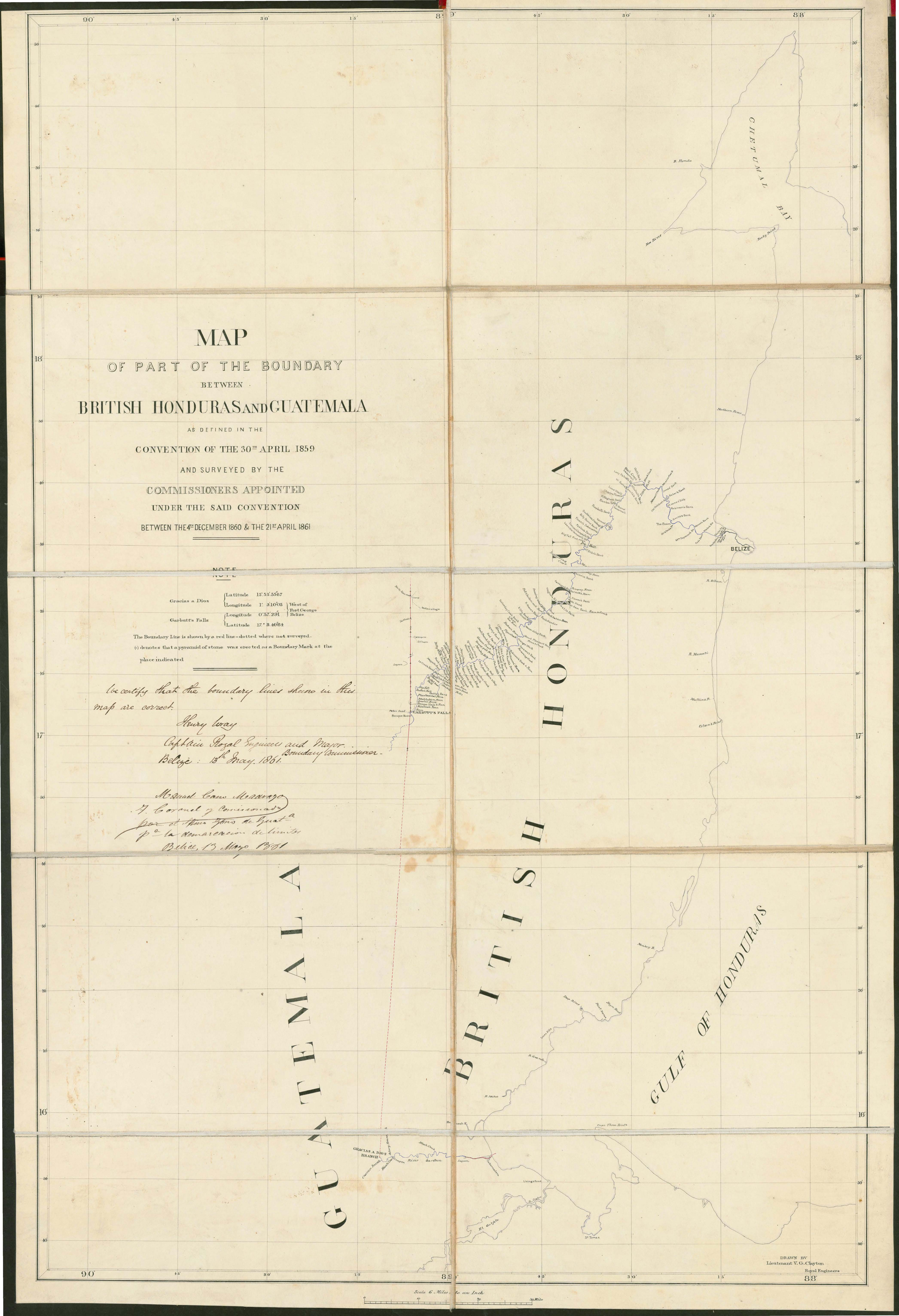
Map of the border between British Honduras and Guatemala as delineated in the Wyke–Aycinena Treaty of 1859.

By the 1820s, the Spanish Empire was quickly losing its grip in Central America and New Spain. New Spain (now Mexico) declared independence in 1821. Guatemala, with other Central American states, declared independence without resistance and, after a brief two-year stint in the First Mexican Empire, the new states formed the Federal Republic of Central America. The new nations claimed they had inherited Spain's sovereign rights in the area. Guatemala's claims were one of two. They either claimed all of the Bay of Honduras, like the Spanish did previously, or they shared claims with Mexico, splitting the land into two along the Sibun River, with Mexico getting the northern half. The latter claim was formed in theory in the early 1800s, but there is speculation that Mexico never wanted to act on claims to the settlement until the 1840s and 50s during the Caste War.

Also in the 1820s, the Baymen had expanded as far south as the Sarstoon River, and much farther west, violating the boundaries of the treaties Britain had agreed to. In 1834, Belizean magistrates defined the boundaries of the settlement as the Hondo on the north, the Sarstoon on the south, and in the west, a line from Garbutt's Falls to the Hondo in the north and to the Sarstoon in the south.

Neither Spain nor Guatemala had any evidence of occupying the newly claimed region, despite technically still being under Spanish sovereignty. Britain also refused to acknowledge the Federal Republic of Central America and negotiate with them over the territory. Instead, Britain deferred to Spain, asking for formal cession of sovereignty. Spain never formally responded to the request, though in 1836, Spain's Foreign Minister indicated Spain would be able to cede the territory to Britain. Guatemala was officially recognized in 1849 by the British government through a commercial treaty.

In 1850, Britain signed the Clayton-Bulwer Treaty, which stated that neither Britain nor the U.S. could extend their influence by occupation, by exchanging land, colonization, or building fortifications in Central America. This presented a problem for Britain since the last time the settlement's boundaries were negotiated was in 1786, and the local government had unilaterally declared new expansive boundaries by then.

In the Wyke–Aycinena Treaty of 1859, Guatemala agreed to recognize Britain's sovereignty over the area. The treaty derived its boundary from the Belizean magistrates of 20 years prior, stating the boundary line in Article I as follows:

Beginning at the mouth of the River Sarstoon in the Bay of Honduras, and proceeding up the mid-channel thereof to Gracias á Dios Falls; then turning to the right and continuing by a line drawn direct from Gracias á Dios Falls to Garbutt's Falls on the River Belize, and from Garbutt's Falls due north until it strikes the Mexican frontier.

The treaty also specified that these borders had been established before 1850, satisfying the 1850 treaty by merely declaring accepted boundaries for the territory, not extending Britain's influence. Article VII of the treaty also talked about a road being built from "Guatemala to the Atlantic Coast, near the settlement of Belize", though it makes no mention of who pays, who builds nor where it is actually placed in between Belize City and Guatemala's capital. This section of the treaty was put in by Wyke, the British negotiator, by himself, surprising the British. Wyke understood the article to mean that half of the burden of building the road was put onto Britain, and the other half onto Guatemala. Aycinena, the Guatemalan negotiator, understood this article meant that the full burden was to be put onto Britain and Britain alone. The next few years were spent negotiating how to implement the road clause.

In 1862, the Bay of Honduras officially became a crown colony under the name British Honduras. By 1869, negotiations had stalled about the road. Guatemala and Britain tried to negotiate an Additional Convention, which Guatemala flatly rejected. Britain, using Guatemala's refusal, declared that they were free from the obligations of building the road. Guatemala did not agree, and stated the treaty was one of cession of territory with compensation being the road. Britain could never agree to the Guatemalan terms since that would break the 1850 Clayton-Bulwer Treaty as it is effectively a land deal. In 1871, Guatemala experienced a Liberal revolution and in 1884, cast doubts on Britain being compliant with the 1859 treaty. Guatemala never officially declared the treaty void at this time, however.

Mexico's claim on British Honduras was dropped in a treaty with Britain in 1893 to end the Caste War. The Rio Hondo was picked as the boundary line between British Honduras and Mexico, solidifying the "Mexican frontier" portion of the 1859 border and providing some legitimacy to the colony.

=== 1930s–1975 ===
In August 1931, an exchange of notes between the UK and Guatemala reaffirmed the borders from the 1859 treaty. These notes show that Guatemala and the UK wanted to finish the demarcation process of the border in 1929. It is confirmed that both governments' commissioners met and constructed the concrete monument markers for the border. One was constructed on Garbutt's Falls, and another was constructed on Gracias á Dios Falls. The Guatemalan Ministry For Foreign Affairs accepted that these markers were built and defined "part of the boundary line".

Two years later, Guatemala inquired the United Kingdom about complying with Article VII. In 1934, the United Kingdom declared their desire to build a road from Belize City to the edge of Petén, where Guatemala would continue building the road to its capital. Guatemala did not agree to this compromise. Instead, they asked for half of the expense of the road (£50,000) in 1859, with interest accruing since. Britain, in August 1936, counter offered with half the original 1859 price but no interest and recognition of the 1859 border, which Guatemala did not accept. A month later, President Ubico suggested 3 new proposals:

1. Britain should "return" British Honduras to Guatemala in exchange for £400,000
2. Britain should pay £400,000 to Guatemala and Britain should cede the southern half of British Honduras to Guatemala
3. Britain should cede the same section of land in the previous proposal and pay £50,000 at a 4% interest rate, with interest accruing from 1859

The United Kingdom did not agree to any of these proposals, proposing half the original 1859 amount again. Guatemala refused again and then suggested arbitration with the President of the United States as the arbitor. The UK declined and instead suggested that the issue be settled by the Hague Court. Guatemala did not believe that the Hague had the ability to settle the dispute. The United Kingdom became fed up and refused to continue negotiations. In 1939, Guatemala's Foreign Ministry published a supplementary section to The White Book, which argued that the 1859 treaty had lapsed.

After the overthrow of General Ubico in 1944, Guatemala adopted a new constitution. In the constitution, as a temporary resolution, Guatemala declared British Honduras part of Guatemala and the integration of it into Guatemala as a national interest.

In February 1948, Guatemala threatened to invade and forcibly annex the territory, and the British responded by deploying two companies from 2nd Battalion Gloucestershire Regiment. One company deployed to the border and found no signs of any Guatemalan incursion, but the British decided to permanently station a company in Belize City. In 1954, a US-backed military coup successfully overthrew Guatemala's government, and for the next 40 years, Guatemala would be ruled by authoritarian military regimes. Guatemala also periodically massed troops on the border of British Honduras in a threatening posture. In 1957, responding to a Guatemalan threat to invade, a company of the Worcestershire Regiment was deployed, staying briefly and carrying out jungle training before leaving. On 21 January 1958, a force of pro-Guatemalan fighters from the Belize Liberation Army, who had likely been aided and encouraged by Guatemala, crossed the border and raised the Guatemalan flag. A British platoon was then deployed and exchanged fire with them, before arresting some 20 fighters.

Negotiations between the United Kingdom and Guatemala began again in 1961, but the elected representatives of British Honduras had no voice in these talks. George Price refused an invitation from Guatemalan President Ydígoras Fuentes to make British Honduras an "associated state" of Guatemala. Price reiterated his goal of leading the colony to independence. In 1963, Guatemala broke off talks and ended diplomatic relations with the United Kingdom. In 1964, the United Kingdom granted British Honduras self-government under a new constitution.

In 1965, the United Kingdom and Guatemala agreed to have an American lawyer by the name of Bethnal M. Webster, appointed by United States President Lyndon Johnson, to mediate the dispute. 3 years later, the Webster Proposals, a draft treaty to resolve the dispute, was publicly published. It did not accomplish its goal. The most controversial section is Article 9 of the draft, which details a shared governmental body, where Guatemala and Belize each put forth 3 ministers, and then a 7th person of "international prominence" is appointed as chairman by the members. If no chairman was picked within 45 days, the US government would pick. The US generally supported Guatemala over the UK and its overseas territories, but was also non-committal on the issue. This shared body ruled over Belize's external affairs, internal security, and defence, effectively handing control from the UK to Guatemala, despite becoming "independent" from the UK in the Proposals. It also has no clause revoking Guatemala's claim directly. The United States supported the proposals. In British Honduras, the public were in civil unrest after hearing the proposals, which led the United Kingdom to reject the draft.

A series of meetings, begun in 1969, ended abruptly in 1972 when the United Kingdom, in response to intelligence suggesting an imminent Guatemalan invasion, announced it was sending the aircraft carrier HMS Ark Royal and her air wing (Phantom FG.1s and Blackburn Buccaneers) alongside 8,000 troops to Belize to conduct amphibious exercises. Guatemala responded by deploying its own troops along the border. Talks resumed in 1973, but broke off in 1975 when tensions flared once again. Guatemala again began massing troops on the border, and the United Kingdom responded by deploying troops, along with a battery of 105mm field guns, surface-to-air missiles, six fighter jets, and a frigate. Following this deployment, tensions were defused, largely as a result of many Guatemalan soldiers deserting.

=== 1975 to independence in 1981 ===
At this point, the Belizean and British governments, frustrated at dealing with the military-dominated regimes in Guatemala, agreed on a new strategy that would take the case for self-determination to various international forums. The Belize government felt that by gaining international support, it could strengthen its position, weaken Guatemala's claims, and make it harder for Britain to make any concessions.

Belize argued that Guatemala frustrated the country's legitimate aspirations to independence and that Guatemala was pushing an irrelevant claim and disguising its own colonial ambitions by trying to present the dispute as an effort to recover territory lost to a colonial power. Between 1975 and 1981, Belizean leaders stated their case for self-determination at a meeting of the heads of Commonwealth of Nations governments in Jamaica, the conference of ministers of the Nonaligned Movement in various Summits, and at meetings of the United Nations (UN). The support of the Nonaligned Movement proved crucial and assured success at the UN. Governments from the Americas initially supported Guatemala. Cuba, however, was the first Spanish speaking country in the Western Hemisphere that, in December 1975, voted to support Belize on a UN resolution for Belize's independence. In 1975/6, Guatemala made further moves against Belize, but was deterred from invading, especially since British fighter jets had by then been permanently stationed there. In 1976, after the 5th Summit of the Non-Aligned Movement, where Belize was invited as a special guest to plead its case for independence, General Omar Torrijos of Panama began to campaign for Belize's cause. Panama subsequently became the first Central American country to vote for Belize's independence in the UN. From 1977 onward, the border was constantly patrolled and observation posts monitored key points. In 1979, the Sandinista government in Nicaragua declared unequivocal support for an independent Belize.

In each of the annual votes on this issue in the UN, the United States abstained, thereby giving the Guatemalan government some hope that it would retain United States backing. Finally, in November 1980, the UN passed a resolution with the backing of the United States, and 0 No votes, that demanded the independence of Belize, with all its territory intact, before the end of the next session of the UN in 1981. The UN called on Britain to continue defending the new nation of Belize. It also called on all member countries to offer their assistance.

A last attempt was made to reach an agreement with Guatemala prior to the independence of Belize. The Belizean representatives to the talks made no concessions, and a proposal, called the Heads of Agreement, was initialled on 11 March 1981. Although the Heads of Agreement would have given only partial control and access to assets in each other's nations, it collapsed when Guatemala renewed its claims to Belize soil and Belizeans rioted against the British and their own government, claiming the Belizean negotiators were making too many concessions to Guatemala. When far-right political forces in Guatemala labelled the proposals as a sell-out, the Guatemalan government refused to ratify the agreement and withdrew from the negotiations. Meanwhile, the opposition in Belize engaged in violent demonstrations against the Heads of Agreement. The demonstrations resulted in four deaths, many injuries, and damage to the property of the People's United Party leaders and their families. A state of emergency was declared. However, the opposition could offer no real alternatives. With the prospect of independence celebrations in the offing, the opposition's morale fell. Independence came to Belize on 21 September 1981, without reaching an agreement with Guatemala. Belize was admitted into the UN just 4 days later, with Guatemala as the sole vote against the resolution.

=== Post-independence ===
Britain continued to maintain British Forces Belize to protect the country from Guatemala, consisting of an army battalion and No. 1417 Flight RAF of Harrier fighter jets. The British also trained and strengthened the newly formed Belize Defence Force. There was a serious fear of a Guatemalan invasion in April 1982, when it was thought that Guatemala might take advantage of the Falklands War to invade, but these fears never materialised. Around this time, Belize claimed that it was not bound by the 1859 treaty since there were no Belizean signatories.

Significant negotiations between Belize and Guatemala, with the United Kingdom as an observer, resumed in 1988. Guatemala recognised Belize's independence in 1991 and diplomatic relations were established.

In 1994, British Forces Belize was disbanded and most British troops left Belize, but the British maintained a training presence via the British Army Training and Support Unit Belize and 25 Flight AAC until 2011, when the last British forces, except for seconded advisers, left Belize.

On 18 October 1999, Guatemala's Foreign Minister sent a letter to the Prime Minister of Belize, Said Musa, reasserting Guatemala's claim. As a new line of reasoning for their claim (instead of basing it on the 1859 treaty), Guatemala asserted that it had inherited Spain's 1494 and 18th century claims on Belize and was owed more than half of Belize's land mass, from the Sibun River south:

The Government of Guatemala contends that the territory which belonged to the Federal Republic of Central America and, by succession, to the Republic of Guatemala, specifically the area from the Sibun River to the Sarstoon River, which is an integral part of the Province of Verapaz, must be returned to Guatemala.

This claim amounts to 12,272 km^{2} (4,738 sq mi) of territory, or roughly 53% of Belizean territory. The claim includes significant portions of the current Belizean Cayo and Belize Districts, as well as all of the Stann Creek and Toledo Districts, well to the north of the internationally accepted border along the Sarstoon River. The majority of Belizeans are strongly opposed to becoming part of Guatemala.

The Guatemalan military placed personnel at the edge of the internationally recognised border. Belizean patrols incorporating Belize Defence Force members and police forces took up positions on their side of the border.

In February 2000, a Belizean patrol shot and killed a Guatemalan in the area of Mountain Pine Ridge Forest Reserve in Belize. On 24 February 2000, personnel from the two nations encountered each other in Toledo District. The two countries held further talks on 14 March 2000, at the Organization of American States (OAS) in the presence of Secretary General César Gaviria at OAS headquarters in Washington, D.C. Eventually they agreed to establish an "adjacency zone" extending one kilometre (0.62 mi) on either side of the 1859 treaty line, now designated the "adjacency line", and to continue negotiations.

=== Developments since 2005 ===
In September 2005, Belize, Guatemala and the OAS signed the Confidence Building Measures document, committing the parties to avoid conflicts or incidents on the ground conducive to tension between them.

In June 2008, Belizean Prime Minister Dean Barrow said resolving the dispute was his main political goal. He proposed referendums for the citizens of Belize and Guatemala, asking whether they support referring the issue to the International Court of Justice (ICJ). A "Special Agreement" on submitting the issue to the ICJ was signed on 8 December 2008. In the Special Agreement, a referendum was to be held on the issue simultaneously in Belize and Guatemala on 6 October 2013, but Guatemala did not go through with the process.

In May 2015, Belize allowed Guatemala to proceed with a referendum asking the ICJ to definitively rule on the dispute although Belize by its own admission is not ready for such a vote. Guatemala was initially expected to hold its referendum on the issue during its second round of presidential elections in October 2015, but such a vote was not on the ballot.

Former Guatemalan president Jimmy Morales made statements strongly in support of Guatemala's longstanding territorial claim to Belize, saying, "Something is happening right now, we are about to lose Belize. We have not lost it yet. We still have the possibility of going to the International Court of Justice where we can fight that territory or part of that territory."

On 20 April 2016, tensions rose as Belizean forces fatally shot a 13/14-year old Guatemalan teenager and resulted in a border standoff. Belize claims it shot in self defence after being fired upon, but the teenager's father and Guatemala claim the Belizean forces were the aggressors.

On 13 January 2017, Belizean law changed from requiring any referendums vote to have 60% voter turnout to a simple majority vote.

The Guatemalan referendum was finally held on 15 April 2018. 95.88% of voters supported sending the claim to the ICJ. Voter turnout was 25%. The Belize referendum was scheduled for 10 April 2019; however, challenges to the legality of the referendum caused it to be delayed.

On 15 April 2019, during the crisis over the delay of the Belizean referendum, three Guatemalan gunboats prevented the Belizean coast guard from patrolling the Sarstoon River on the border between the two countries.

On 8 May 2019, the referendum in Belize was finally held, and 55.4% of voters agreed to allow the International Court of Justice to resolve the dispute.

== International Court of Justice ==
As of 7 June 2019, the International Court of Justice (ICJ) formally took up the dispute, having received requests from both countries to do so. On 22 April 2020, the ICJ extended the due dates for briefs from both countries about the matter, due to the COVID-19 pandemic's interference in their preparations. Guatemala's was due 8 December 2020 and Belize's was due 8 June 2022. In December 2022, Guatemala submitted a reply to Belize's brief, and on 7 June 2023, Belize responded to submit a final Rejoinder to the court, closing the written submission stage. Oral arguments in front of the ICJ are scheduled for February and March 2027.

It is thought that the court will likely rule in Belize's favour, given that the 1859 treaty was ratified by both sides and implemented by Guatemala for 80 years, that Guatemala has never occupied any part of Belize, and that Belize's boundaries have been recognized by virtually all independent states.

== See also ==
- Belize–Guatemala border
- Belize–Guatemala relations
- Foreign relations of Belize
- Foreign relations of Guatemala
- Sarstoon Island
- Sapodilla Cayes
- Chiapas (incl. Soconusco), a Mexican state that was claimed by Guatemala until 1895
- British Forces Belize
