= Joseph Mahmud =

Belizean politician

Member of the Belize House of Representatives for Cayo North
- In office 7 March 2012 – 24 November 2014
- Preceded by: Salvador Fernandez
- Succeeded by: Omar Figueroa

Personal details
- Party: People's United Party

Joseph Mahmud is a Belizean politician and a member of the People's United Party (PUP). He was elected March 2012 as Area Representative for the Cayo North constituency in the Cayo District.

In November 2014 Mahmud unexpectedly resigned from the Belize House, becoming the first Belize House member since independence to voluntarily resign mid-term. A by-election in Cayo North to determine Mahmud's successor was held on 5 January 2015. Mahmud had previously indicated he would stand down at the 2015 general election.
