= Sarstoon Temash Institute for Indigenous Management =

- Founded: 1997
- Type: Non-profit; NGO
- Location: Toledo District, Belize
- Key people: Froyla Tzalam, Executive Director
- Website: satiim.org.bz

The Sarstoon Temash Institute for Indigenous Management (SATIIM) is a nonprofit non-governmental organization which represents people in a group of five villages that live outside of Sarstoon-Temash National Park in Belize. They co-manage the park with the Forest Department of Belize and contest outside interference in the park.

== Organization ==
=== Founding ===
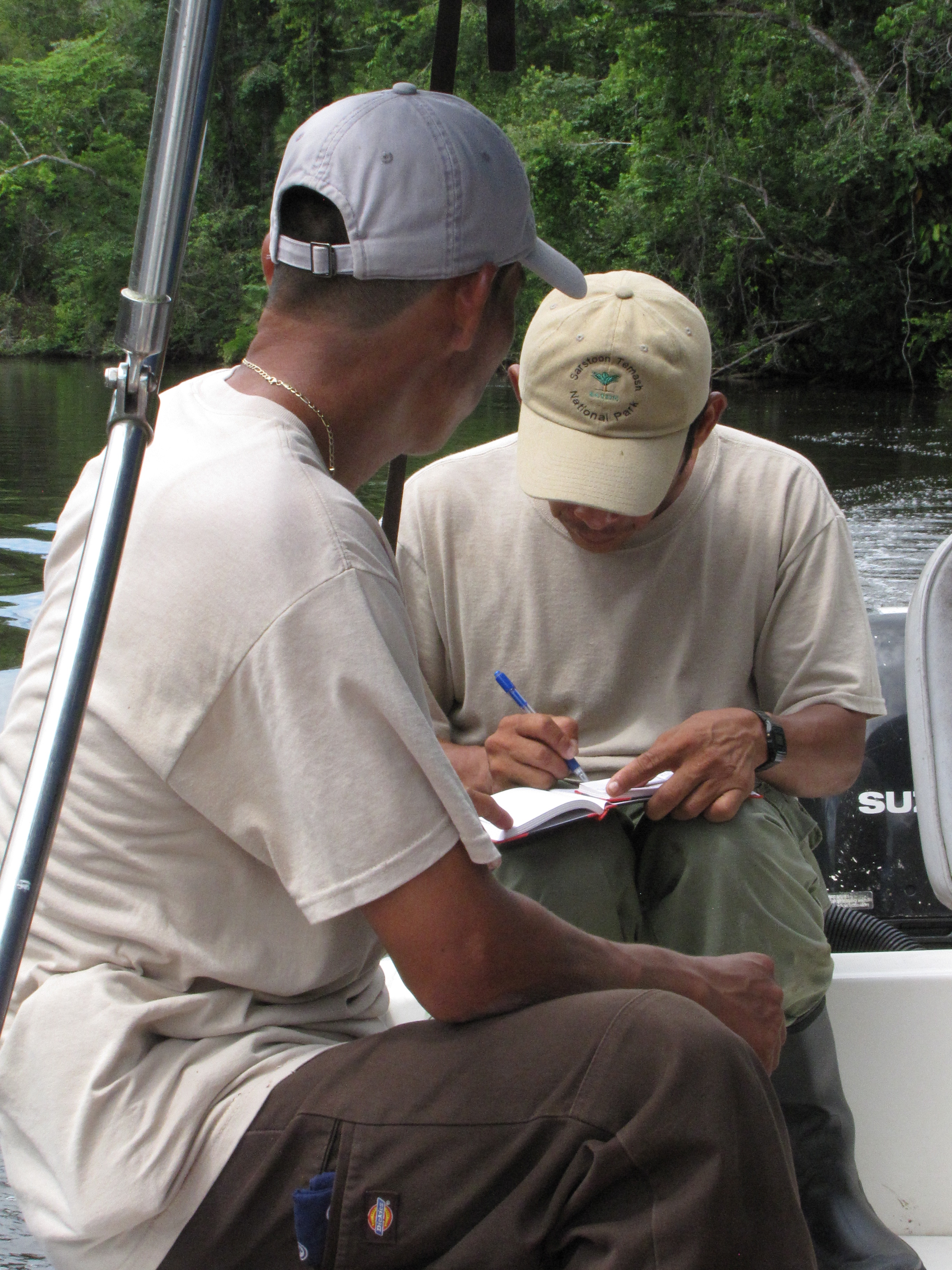
SATIIM rangers on patrol in Sarstoon-Temash National Park.

The Sarstoon-Temash National Park was founded in the Toledo District in 1994. Local residents had not been consulted about the creation of a national park in their region, and in 1997, residents around the park began to hear about it through the media for the first time. Residents had a cross-ethnic meeting of the five separate communities that lived around the border of the new park, where many expressed anger with the creation of a national park in places and were afraid that the national park might be used to infringe on their indigenous land claims. Ultimately, an agreement was reached with the creation of SATIIM in 1997 to manage the park and its surrounding areas on behalf of the communities around it.

The Conservation Division of the Ministry of Natural Resources is in charge of overseeing all the protected regions in Belize, totaling over 38% of the country's land area, with a staff of 3 people as of 2000, and actively seeks local partnerships to help management responsibilities. In 2003, the government of Belize signed an agreement with SATIIM to allow them to co-manage the park with the Forest Department. SATIIM's assistance in managing the forest has helped the membership of SATIIM to understand land boundaries of the region more clearly and to be better able to claim indigenous land rights.

=== Challenges ===
In 2005, the Belize government announced that it was permitting a Guatemalan-based oil company to conduct seismic tests in the national park. SATIIM challenged Belize's decision in court successfully based on a technicality. SATIIM also successfully defended the right of the indigenous population to use the park's land in 2007 in a Supreme Court case, which allows the Maya to use the land based on their long term occupation and not a deed that the government would have had to provide them.

=== US Capital Energy tests ===
SATIIM has protested the expansion of seismic tests for oil and other resources by US Capital Energy in Sarstoon-Temash National Park since 2009. SATIIM criticized the Forest Ministry for stonewalling the organization in negotiating a renewal of US Capital Energy's contract to conduct seismic tests in the park. In an interview with Channel 5 Belize, SATIIM's director Gregory Ch'oc alleged that US Capital Energy's seismic tests had led to the start of a forest fire inside of the park, and have criticized US Capital for allowing illegal loggers to enter into the park's territory. In response to a letter writing campaign against the seismic tests that SATIIM spearheaded, Prime Minister Dean Barrow noted, "Clearly this is an organized effort on the part of SATIIM and more power to them but I can tell them that that effort will have absolutely no impact on the government."
