= Belize–Guatemala border =

International border

Map of Central America showing Belize-Guatemala border

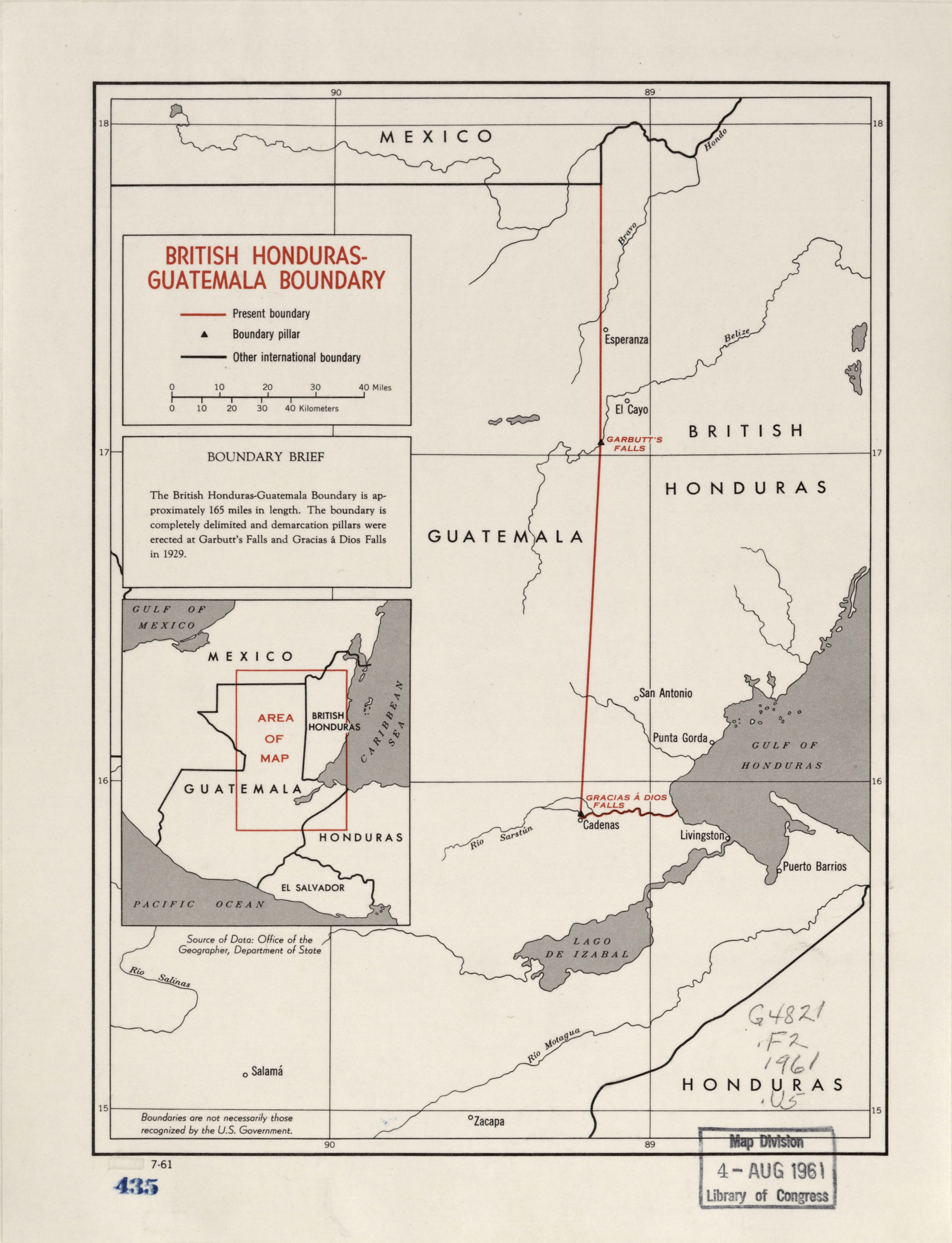
A 1961 map of the border between British Honduras (now Belize) and Guatemala

The Belize–Guatemala border is an almost straight line 266 km (165 mi) long, close to the 89th meridian west, which separates the west of Belize's territory from Guatemala's.

== Border description and history ==
The border between Belize and Guatemala is defined in Article I of the Wyke–Aycinena Treaty of 1859:

Beginning at the mouth of the River Sarstoon in the Bay of Honduras, and proceeding up the mid-channel thereof to Gracias a Dios Falls; then turning to the right and continuing by a line drawn direct from Gracias a Dios Falls to Garbutt's Falls on the Mopan River, and from Garbutt's Falls due north until it strikes the Mexican frontier.

The border has been disputed by Guatemala, which claims that the treaty is void since Britain failed to comply with economic assistance provisions found in Article VII. The situation was partially resolved in 1991 when Guatemala officially recognized Belize's independence and diplomatic relations were established.

== Border communities and crossings ==
There is one main highway crossing of the border, at Benque Viejo del Carmen, Cayo District, Belize and Melchor de Mencos, Peten, Guatemala, where Guatemala Highway CA-13 meets the George Price (Western) Highway, connecting to Belize City and Belmopan.

About four kilometers south of this crossing is the village of Arenal, which has homes on both sides of the border, and a football field directly on the border.

== See also ==
- Belize–Guatemala relations
- Belizean–Guatemalan territorial dispute
- Belize–Mexico border
