= 2018 Guatemalan territorial dispute referendum =

Referendum held in Guatemala

- 15 April 2018
- Do you agree that any legal claim of Guatemala against Belize relating to land and insular territories and to any maritime areas pertaining to these territories should be submitted to the International Court of Justice for final settlement and that it determines finally the boundaries of the respective territories and areas of the parties?
- Website: TSE Guatemala

Results
Choice	Votes	%
Yes	1,780,530	95.88%
No	76,602	4.12%
Valid votes	1,857,132	92.64%
Invalid or blank votes	147,597	7.36%
Total votes	2,004,729	100.00%
Registered voters/turnout	7,522,920	26.65%

A referendum on the territorial dispute with Belize was held in Guatemala on Sunday 15 April 2018. Voters were asked whether the Guatemalan government should request the International Court of Justice to resolve the territorial dispute permanently, as part of a commitment signed in December 2008 between Guatemala and Belize. Guatemalan Vice President, Jafeth Cabrera, stated that Belize would hold their referendum in response in May 2018, but Belize released a statement denying that and stating rather that it would hold the referendum after the re-registration process has occurred to ensure an accurate and fair vote.

== Background ==
In May 2015, Belize allowed Guatemala to proceed with a referendum asking the International Court of Justice (ICJ) to definitively rule on the dispute although Belize by its own admission is not ready for such a vote. A previous treaty between the two countries stipulated that any such vote must be held simultaneously. Guatemala was initially expected to hold its referendum on the issue during its second round of presidential elections in October 2015, but such a vote was not on the ballot. Belize has yet to announce its vote on the matter.

Guatemalan president Jimmy Morales has made statements strongly in support of Guatemala's old territorial claim to Belize: "Something is happening right now, we are about to lose Belize. We have not lost it yet. We still have the possibility of going to the International Court of Justice where we can fight that territory or part of that territory."

If the population voted "No," a referendum would be called again in six months, until it wins "Yes" since both countries agree that the only way to solve the dispute is by means of the International Court of Justice. The call for the referendum was made on 23 October 2017.

== Administration ==
On 2 August 2017, the Guatemalan Congress approved the agreement 22-2017, which allows the president to immediately submit to the Supreme Electoral Tribunal the request to convene the referendum. The agreement was approved by 102 votes in favor and 14 against. The European Union provided financial assistance for this to take place.

The Government of Guatemala convened a public consultation, and immediately, the Supreme Electoral Tribunal called a referendum on Sunday, 15 April 2018.

Around 7.5 million people registered for the referendum. Members of the armed forces (Air Force, Army, and Navy), people in prison, and Guatemalans living abroad were not allowed to vote.

=== Question ===
The question of the referendum was this: "Do you agree that any legal claim of Guatemala against Belize relating to land and insular territories and to any maritime areas pertaining to these territories should be submitted to the International Court of Justice for final settlement and that it determines finally the boundaries of the respective territories and areas of the parties?"

Ballot question
English	Do you agree that any legal claim of Guatemala against Belize relating to land and insular territories and to any maritime areas pertaining to these territories should be submitted to the International Court of Justice for final settlement and that it determines finally the boundaries of the respective territories and areas of the parties?
Spanish	¿Está de acuerdo que cualquier reclamo legal de Guatemala en contra de Belice sobre territorios continentales e insulares y cualesquiera áreas marítimas correspondientes a dichos territorios sea sometido a la Corte Internacional de Justicia para su resolución definitiva y que esta determine las fronteras de los respectivos territorios y áreas de las partes?

== Results ==
Choice	Votes	%
For	1,780,530	95.88
Against	76,602	4.12
Total	1,857,132	100.00
Valid votes	1,857,132	92.64
Invalid/blank votes	147,597	7.36
Total votes	2,004,729	100.00
Registered voters/turnout	7,522,920	26.65
Source: TSE

== See also ==
- 1984 Argentine Beagle conflict dispute resolution referendum
- 2019 Belizean territorial dispute referendum
- 2023 Venezuelan referendum
