= Cayo North =

Electoral constituency in Belize

- Constituency for the Belize House of Representatives
- District: Cayo
- Electorate: 8,439(2022)
- Major settlements: San Ignacio (part), Bullet Tree Falls

Current constituency
- Created: 1961
- Party: People's United Party
- Area Representative: Michel Chebat

Cayo North is an electoral constituency in the Cayo District represented in the House of Representatives of the National Assembly of Belize by Michel Chebat of the People’s United Party (PUP).

== Profile ==
The Cayo North constituency was created for the 1961 general election as part of a major nationwide redistricting. The constituency is based in the northwestern corner of Cayo District. It includes the southern part of San Ignacio as well as the villages of Bullet Tree Falls and Paslow Falls.

Joseph Mahmud of the People's United Party, who was elected in the 2012 election, unexpectedly resigned in November 2014. A by-election was held on 5 January 2015 to elect Mahmud's successor. The by-election was only the third in Belize since independence, preceded by by-elections in Freetown (January 1993) and Cayo South (October 2003). Candidate nominations closed on 15 December 2014 with PUP nominee Richard Harrison and UDP nominee Omar Figueroa qualifying. No third party candidates appeared on the ballot. Figueroa won the by-election by a nearly 2-to-1 margin, increasing the UDP's overall majority in the Belize House.

== Area representatives ==
Election	Area representative	Party
1961	Hector Silva	PUP
1965	Hector Silva	PUP
1969	Hector Silva	PUP
1974	Joseph Andrews	UDP
1979	Assad Shoman	PUP
1984	Salvador Fernandez	UDP
1989	Salvador Fernandez	UDP
1993	Salvador Fernandez	UDP
1998	Ainslie Leslie	PUP
2003	Ainslie Leslie	PUP
2008	Salvador Fernandez	UDP
2012	Joseph Mahmud	PUP
2015 by-election	Omar Figueroa	UDP
2015	Omar Figueroa	UDP
2020	Michel Chebat	PUP
2025	Michel Chebat	PUP

== Elections ==
Election	Political result	Candidate	Party	Votes	%	±%
2025 general election Electorate: 8,980; Turnout: 6,256 (69.67%) -13.22	PUP hold Majority: 931 (14.88%) +0.40	Michel Chebat	PUP	3,518	56.23	-0.54
2025 general election Electorate: 8,980; Turnout: 6,256 (69.67%) -13.22	PUP hold Majority: 931 (14.88%) +0.40	Omar Figueroa	UDP	2,587	41.35	-0.94
2025 general election Electorate: 8,980; Turnout: 6,256 (69.67%) -13.22	PUP hold Majority: 931 (14.88%) +0.40	Leroy Lisbey	Belizeans Justice Movement	67	1.07	-
2020 general election Electorate: 8,058; Turnout: 6,679 (82.89%) +7.47	PUP gain from UDP; Majority: 955 (14.48%) +11.44	Michel Chebat	PUP	3,745	56.77	+8.72
2020 general election Electorate: 8,058; Turnout: 6,679 (82.89%) +7.47	PUP gain from UDP; Majority: 955 (14.48%) +11.44	Omar Figueroa	UDP	2,790	42.29	-8.80
2020 general election Electorate: 8,058; Turnout: 6,679 (82.89%) +7.47	PUP gain from UDP; Majority: 955 (14.48%) +11.44	Kurt Lizarraga	Belize People's Front	62	0.94	-
2015 general election Electorate: 6,940; Turnout: 5,234 (75.42%) +13.8	UDP hold Majority: 159 (3.04%) -29.47	Omar Figueroa	UDP	2,674	51.09	-14.60
2015 general election Electorate: 6,940; Turnout: 5,234 (75.42%) +13.8	UDP hold Majority: 159 (3.04%) -29.47	Michel Chebat	PUP	2,515	48.05	+14.87
January 2015 by-election Electorate: 6,598; Turnout: 4,063 (61.6%) −13.1	UDP gain from PUP; Majority: 1,321 (32.51%) +23.95	Omar Figueroa	UDP	2,669	65.69	+22.92
January 2015 by-election Electorate: 6,598; Turnout: 4,063 (61.6%) −13.1	UDP gain from PUP; Majority: 1,321 (32.51%) +23.95	Richard Harrison	PUP	1,348	33.18	−18.15
2012 general election Electorate: 6,213; Turnout: 4,641 (74.7%) −3.3	PUP gain from UDP; Majority: 397 (8.56%) −19.85	Joseph Mahmud	PUP	2,382	51.33	+17.27
2012 general election Electorate: 6,213; Turnout: 4,641 (74.7%) −3.3	PUP gain from UDP; Majority: 397 (8.56%) −19.85	Salvador Fernandez	UDP	1,985	42.77	−19.7
2012 general election Electorate: 6,213; Turnout: 4,641 (74.7%) −3.3	PUP gain from UDP; Majority: 397 (8.56%) −19.85	Marcel Bedran	Independent	191	4.12	-
2008 general election Electorate: 5,213; Turnout: 4,066 (78.0%) −4.9	UDP gain from PUP; Majority: 1,155 (28.41%) +24.7	Salvador Fernandez	UDP	2,540	62.47	+14.76
2008 general election Electorate: 5,213; Turnout: 4,066 (78.0%) −4.9	UDP gain from PUP; Majority: 1,155 (28.41%) +24.7	Otto Coleman	PUP	1,385	34.06	−17.36
2008 general election Electorate: 5,213; Turnout: 4,066 (78.0%) −4.9	UDP gain from PUP; Majority: 1,155 (28.41%) +24.7	Alden McDougall	NRP	100	2.46	-
2003 general election Electorate: 6,842; Turnout: 5,673 (82.9%) −10.12	PUP hold Majority: 210 (3.71%) +1.93	Ainslie Leslie	PUP	2,917	51.42	+1.2
2003 general election Electorate: 6,842; Turnout: 5,673 (82.9%) −10.12	PUP hold Majority: 210 (3.71%) +1.93	Dean Williams	UDP	2,707	47.71	−0.73
1998 general election Electorate: 5,045; Turnout: 4,693 (93.02%) +17.23	PUP gain from UDP; Majority: 84 (1.78%) +1.38	Ainslie Leslie	PUP	2,357	50.22	+0.42
1998 general election Electorate: 5,045; Turnout: 4,693 (93.02%) +17.23	PUP gain from UDP; Majority: 84 (1.78%) +1.38	Salvador Fernandez	UDP	2,273	48.44	−1.76
1998 general election Electorate: 5,045; Turnout: 4,693 (93.02%) +17.23	PUP gain from UDP; Majority: 84 (1.78%) +1.38	Nazim Elias Juan	Independent	32	0.68	-
1993 general election Electorate: 4,964; Turnout: 3,762 (75.79%) −2.88	UDP hold Majority: 18 (0.4%) −7.7	Salvador Fernandez	UDP	1,890	50.2	−2.7
1993 general election Electorate: 4,964; Turnout: 3,762 (75.79%) −2.88	UDP hold Majority: 18 (0.4%) −7.7	Ainslie Leslie	PUP	1,872	49.8	+5.0
1989 general election Electorate: 3,751; Turnout: 2,951 (78.67%) −0.96	UDP hold Majority: 241 (8.1%) −10.5	Salvador Fernandez	UDP	1,562	52.9	−6.0
1989 general election Electorate: 3,751; Turnout: 2,951 (78.67%) −0.96	UDP hold Majority: 241 (8.1%) −10.5	Ismael Garcia	PUP	1,321	44.8	+4.5
1984 general election Electorate: 2,711; Turnout: 2,159 (79.63%) −12.38	UDP gain from PUP; Majority: 402 (18.6%) +14.9	Salvador Fernandez	UDP	1,271	58.9	+11.29
1984 general election Electorate: 2,711; Turnout: 2,159 (79.63%) −12.38	UDP gain from PUP; Majority: 402 (18.6%) +14.9	Orlando Harrison	PUP	869	40.3	−11.1
1979 general election Electorate: 4,107; Turnout: 3,779 (92.01%) +14.02	PUP gain from UDP; Majority: 3.7% (+0.3)	Assad Shoman	PUP		51.4	+4.8
1979 general election Electorate: 4,107; Turnout: 3,779 (92.01%) +14.02	PUP gain from UDP; Majority: 3.7% (+0.3)	Joseph Andrews	UDP		47.7	−2.3
1974 general election Electorate: 2,621; Turnout: 2,044 (77.99%) +2.95	UDP gain from PUP; Majority: 3.4% (+3.3)	Joseph Andrews	UDP		50.0	-
1974 general election Electorate: 2,621; Turnout: 2,044 (77.99%) +2.95	UDP gain from PUP; Majority: 3.4% (+3.3)	Assad Shoman	PUP		46.6	−2.4
1969 general election Electorate: 1,695; Turnout: 1,272 (75.04%) +3.83	PUP hold Majority: 0.1% (−25.5)	Hector Silva	PUP		49.0	−12.9
1969 general election Electorate: 1,695; Turnout: 1,272 (75.04%) +3.83	PUP hold Majority: 0.1% (−25.5)	Joseph Andrews	NIP		48.9	+12.6
1965 general election Electorate: 1,886; Turnout: 1,343 (71.21%) −9.44	PUP hold Majority: 25.6% (−17.9)	Hector Silva	PUP		61.9	−8.6
1965 general election Electorate: 1,886; Turnout: 1,343 (71.21%) −9.44	PUP hold Majority: 25.6% (−17.9)	Theodocio Ochoa	NIP		36.3	-
1961 general election Electorate: 1,292; Turnout: 1,042 (80.65%) n/a	PUP win Majority: 43.5% (n/a)	Hector Silva	PUP		70.5	-
1961 general election Electorate: 1,292; Turnout: 1,042 (80.65%) n/a	PUP win Majority: 43.5% (n/a)	Manuel Figueroa	CDP		16.3	-
