= Maya Golden Landscape =

The Maya Golden Landscape is an area in Belize of approximately 275,000 hectares consisting of protected areas, agriculture, private lands and many small communities that is under the management of the Ya'axché Conservation Trust in Toledo District. The Landscape area encompasses the Bladen Nature Reserve, Colombia River Forest Reserve, Cockscomb Basin Wildlife Sanctuary, Deep River Forest River Reserve, Port Honduras Marine Reserve, along with commercial and subsistence farmland. Most of the area is dominated with various types of broadleaf forests which varies with topography, soil type and the disturbance history (which are disturbances caused by hurricanes or agriculture). One disturbance that affect the area, as well, is fires caused by agricultural farming due to the slash and burn practice.

== History ==
Initiated by a group of local Mayan leaders in 1997, the Maya Golden Landscape was then strengthened by the support of Fauna and Flora International. The Ya’axché Conservation Trust has been directing this corridor along with the assistance of the management of the individual protected areas within the Maya Golden Landscape.

== Topography ==
Encompassing four terrestrial protected areas, the Maya Golden Landscape most evident topographical feature is the Maya Mountains that occur along the Columbia Forest Reserve, Cockscomb Basin Wildlife Sanctuary, Deep River Forest River Reserve and Bladen Nature Reserves. Other topographical features includes karst limestone hills, caves, sinkholes and draining basins at the base of the Maya Mountains which feed surrounding water bodies and watersheds.

== Habitats ==
The terrestrial component of the Maya Golden Landscape comprises habitats of spectacular diversity and variety. The karst limestone hills of the Maya Mountains down to the Caribbean Sea are evidence of possible stream action within the hills. Habitats to be encountered in the terrestrial component of the landscape includes tropical rainforests, pine savannas, coastal wetlands and mangrove forests.

The Marine component of this landscape is most recognizable for its protected barrier reefs. Recognised under the Meso-American Barrier Reef System, the Barrier Reef is a keystone agent in maintaining and protecting the marine environment for endangered marine species.

== Disturbance history ==
=== Fires and Hurricanes ===
The first fires documented are from the period from the years 1998 to 2001. The fires are usually ignited during the dry season, which is generally from March to May, as means of preparation for crops and may often escape into surrounding farms and nearby forests, especially if the season and conditions adequate. The areas damaged by this fires appears insignificant in the story map; however, they do matter. According to the statistics 550.521 hectares were affected by the fires in 1998, 453.43 hectares in 1999, 388.26 hectares in 2000 and 6.39 hectares in 2001.

During the period of 2002–2007, approximately 11,907 hectares of forest as damaged by fire. A major contributor to the spike in fire damage was Hurricane Iris which passed directly through the area in October 2001 leaving dead vegetation in its path. This dead vegetation dried out during the dry season and covered the forest floor. This dried dead vegetation served as fuel for the fires in 2002, which occurred next to a large savanna area, and 2003, in the hills behind Golden Stream. Other fires areas that burnt in 2003 burnt again in 2005, but the burnt area extended beyond the boundary of 2003 fire scar.

The fires from the period of the years 2008-2015 damaged an estimated 5078 hectares of forest. In 2008 significant large fire scars were detected. This fire scars were in the same area which was affected by fires in 2003 and 2005, but this time the fire extended further beyond these previous fire scar boundaries and further into the forest. There were also fires that burnt the karstic ridges west of Golden Stream and Medina Bank which had already been burnt by fires in 2003; however, this fires didn't extend beyond the 2003 fire scars areas. In 2013, numerous fire scars were detected in the severe dry season of that year. Many large fires were detected to have escaped from agricultural areas. Some areas that had been previously burnt were re-burnt. A large fire scar was present on the map and it seemed that it probably escaped from an isolated farm in the forest waste of Indian Creek. Another fire escaped from the South-East of Tambram. The fires that occurred in 2013 show that much more of the forest/agricultural area is susceptible to burning in very severe dry seasons, compared with an average or mild dry season.

== Importance ==
The Maya Golden Landscape in southern Belize is one of the country's largest areas of intact tropical broadleaf forest. The Landscape itself is produced by a mosaic of protected areas placed together in order to establish a wildlife corridor that eases the movement of wildlife within included areas. With over 250 species of birds, 93 species of mammals, and 92 species of reptiles and amphibians in one of the major protected areas located within it, the landscape serves as a biodiversity conservation hotspot. Part of the conservation achievements of the Maya Golden Landscape includes the internationally recognized Jaguar reserve at the Cockscomb Basin Wildlife Sanctuary
