= Sarstoon River =

River in Belize and Guatemala

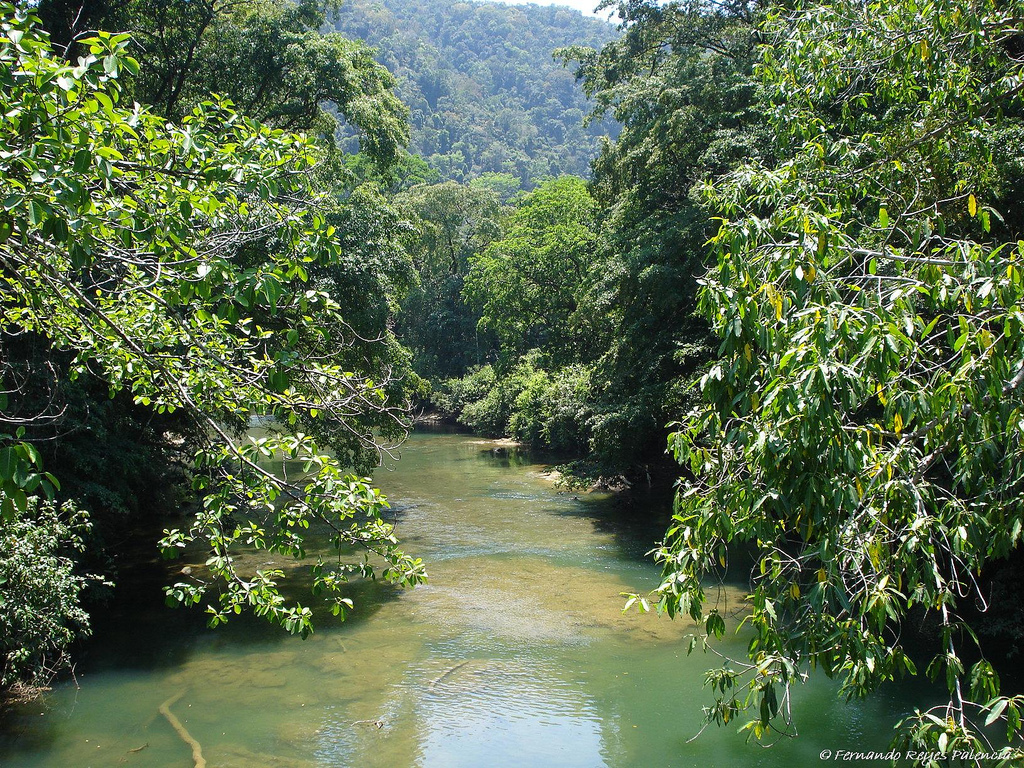
- Native name: Río Sarstún (Spanish)

Location
- Countries: Belize and Guatemala

Physical characteristics
- Source
  - location: Guatemala
- Mouth
  - location: Caribbean Sea
  - coordinates: 15.8976°N 88.9137°W
  - elevation: 0 m (0 ft)
- Length: 111 km

The Sarstoon River (Spanish: Río Sarstún) is river that flows eastward from Guatemala to the Gulf of Honduras in Central America. It forms Guatemala's border with Belize. The source of the 111-kilometre (69 mi)-long river lies in Guatemala's Sierra de Santa Cruz mountain range in Alta Verapaz Department. Near its mouth lies Sarstoon Island.

== Territorial dispute between Belize and Guatemala ==
The Wyke–Aycinena Treaty between Britain (in possession of what was then British Honduras) and Guatemala, signed on 22 April 1859, set the boundary between the two regions. However it was conditional on Britain building a road connecting Guatemala with the Atlantic Ocean, which it did not do. In 1940, Guatemala declared the treaty void based on this. It initially claimed all of Belize as its own territory and repeatedly threatened to invade its neighbor. From 1999, it reduced that claim to the area of southern Belize between the Sibun and Sarstoon rivers.

The Belize Defence Force established a forward operating base (FOB) on the north bank of the Sarstoon River in 2016; however, the garrison had to be moved to another base after severe erosion made it structurally unsound.

On 15 April 2019, the river was the site of a border incident when three Guatemalan gunboats crewed by armed soldiers prevented the Belize Coast Guard from patrolling the waters.

Belize renovated its FOB and reopened it on 25 April 2024; it directly faces an Armed Forces of Guatemala base across the river. There was a confrontation that same day when Guatemalan soldiers objected to a Belizean boat with soldiers and media personnel aboard circling Sarstoon Island in what they claimed were Guatemalan waters, but the situation did not escalate.
