= Euthanasia solution =

Drug-containing solution for intentionally ending life

A euthanasia solution is a drug-containing aqueous solution for intentionally ending life to either relieve pain and suffering or execute convicts. The drugs used in euthanasia solution do not only need to be safe to personnel, but they also need to have a rapid onset of action and minimize the possible pain felt by humans and animals. To satisfy these requirements, the active ingredients in the euthanasia solution are usually anaesthetics, respiratory depressants, cardiotoxic drugs and cytotoxic drugs.

An overview of the ingredients used in the euthanasia solution

For animals, euthanasia solutions have different routes of administration, including injection, oral absorption, and immersion. This depends on the type of animals, based on their anatomical and physiological features. These solutions are predominantly administered to terrestrial animals through injection and to aquatic animals through immersion. While some euthanasia solutions are approved by the Food and Drug Administration (FDA) and are commercially available, some are not FDA-approved and they need to be compounded by the veterinarians because of the potential hazards to humans and animals.

For humans, the drugs used may differ from those for animals use. They can be used to execute convicts on death row or to euthanize humans under legal circumstances.

== Active Ingredients ==
=== Muscle relaxants ===
Muscle relaxants are drugs that relax the respiratory muscles, mainly the diaphragm and the intercostal muscles. Ingredients such as pancuronium bromide (Pavulon) and alcuronium bromide (Alloferin) can block the acetylcholine receptors of the muscle cells in the neuromuscular junction to prevent respiratory muscles contraction. By paralyzing these muscles, the animals or humans stop breathing. Eventually, because of the lack of oxygen, also called hypoxia, brain death results. Besides, these drugs are effective in reducing the suffering of the objects by preventing the terminal gasp caused by barbiturates.

=== Anaesthetics ===
Anaesthetics are drugs that reduce the pain felt by the animals or humans during euthanasia. Local anaesthetics, which involve numbing the injected area to diminish the pain from the injection of euthanasia solution, and general anaesthetics, which induce coma to the objects, are used together. They exert their effects by preventing the nerve impulses from being transmitted to the cerebrum, the largest part of the brain.

=== Barbiturates ===
Barbiturates (e.g. pentobarbital and sodium thiopental) are general anaesthetics. They attach to gamma-aminobutyric acid (GABA) A receptors and lengthen the time of opening of chloride channels in the nerve cells. This depresses the activity of nerves and interrupts nerve signaling to the brain. Moreover, since barbiturates can depress the brain's respiratory centre and cardiac centre which controls breathing and the heart respectively, they cause breathing and the heart to stop suddenly, known as respiratory arrest and cardiac arrest.

=== Voltage-dependent sodium channel blockers ===
Sodium channel blockers, like benzocaine, lidocaine, phenytoin, and tricaine methanesulfonate, are regularly used to produce rapid local anaesthetic effects. By preventing sodium ions from entering the nerve cells, there will be no electrical impulse generated in those cells surrounding the affected area to transmit signals to the brain.

=== Cardiotoxic drugs ===
The heart relies on normal levels of ion intake in blood to have a normal rhythm of contraction. Cardiotoxic drugs act on cardiac muscles to cease muscle contraction. As the heart fails to pump blood to the body, other vital organs will die of lacking oxygen and nutrients.

=== Potassium chloride ===
Saturated potassium chloride solution is used to introduce potassium ions into the plasma to cause cardiac arrest. Excessive potassium ions in the blood leads to the clearance of the potassium concentration gradient in cardiac muscles. Hence, the repolarization of cardiac muscles is hindered and the subsequent contraction and relaxation of cardiac muscles is halted. Since high-dose potassium ions alone can also lead to seizures and muscle spasms, pain is felt by the euthanized animal before death. Therefore, potassium chloride solution must be injected in anaesthetized patients and animals only.

== Cytotoxic agents ==
Sodium hypochlorite and formaldehyde are applied to euthanize by killing the cells directly. Sodium hypochlorite disrupts the cell processes by saponification of fatty acids and denaturation of proteins while formaldehyde poses oxidative injury to the cells by inducing the cross-linkage of the genetic materials in the cell.

== Application ==
=== Terrestrial animals ===
The route of administration in euthanasia solution varies. Intravenous administration, meaning injection into vein, is commonly used in most animals owing to its rapid speed to distribute the drug into the brain and its high reliability. Whilst there are alternatives like intraperitoneal injection which are less irritating, a larger dose of solution is required to euthanize the animals.

There are two commercially available formulations to euthanize terrestrial animals, T-61 and phenytoin/pentobarbital.

=== T-61 ===
While the commercial production of T-61 has been ceased in the United Kingdom and the United States, T-61 is still often used in most European countries. T-61 contains embutramide, mebezonium iodide, and tetracaine hydrochloride. Despite several merits including fast onset of action and absence of terminal gasps before demise, it can only be injected intravenously into the animals.

=== Phenytoin/pentobarbital ===
The most common drug combination used by veterinarians for euthanasia is phenytoin/pentobarbital. The commercial product Euthasol includes rhodamine B dye, a fluorescent dye added to clearly distinguish the solution, as well as propylene glycol, ethyl alcohol, benzyl alcohol, water, and sodium hydroxide and hydrochloric acid as needed to achieve the desired pH. In conventional practice, this combination drug is injected intravenously. However, if intravenous injection causes discomfort to the animal, an alternative route of administration, such as intraperitoneal and intracardiac injection can be used.

== Humans ==
=== Therapeutic uses ===
Some active pharmaceutical ingredients in euthanasia solutions can exert therapeutic effects on humans when indicated for treating diseases. For instance, thiopental and pentobarbital are barbiturates; thiopental can be used for anesthesia, epilepsy as well as intracranial pressure reduction, while pentobarbital is for insomnia and seizure. Another drug, phenytoin, is an anticonvulsant for treating seizures.

Since these drugs act mainly on the brain of the central nervous system, some nations are using them for executions.

=== Execution ===
Flowchart of procedure of adding euthanasia solution in the United States' practices in execution

Different nations adopt varied execution methods. One of these is the 3-drug cocktail.

The 3-drug cocktail was proposed by medical examiner Jay Chapman in the 1970s. According to this method, anaesthetics would first be administered. The drugs may involve barbiturates (e.g. sodium thiopental). Then, paralyzing agents would be injected to paralyze body muscles. Hence, neuromuscular blocking agents (e.g. vecuronium bromide) would be used. Eventually, potassium chloride would be used to stop the heart. All of the above drugs are administered intravenously.

=== Euthanasia ===
The intravenous administration of euthanasia solution is similar to the lethal injection for execution. In Belgium, barbiturates and neuromuscular relaxants have been increasingly used in the past two decades and this combination has been the most common practice. Nevertheless, potassium chloride solution is not recommended in current euthanasia guidelines.

Apart from intravenous administration, euthanasia solution can be taken orally by humans. This can be prepared by dissolving powder containing euthanasia drugs in a glass of water. If the patient has difficulty in swallowing, the euthanasia solution can be delivered via feeding tube. To prevent vomiting and suffering due to the unpleasant taste, the patient is given antiemetic drugs before drinking euthanasia solution. Besides, palatable drinks, such as chocolate and fruit juice, are also given to the patient afterwards.

=== Aquatic animals ===
Although some ingredients in euthanasia solution are useful for euthanasia of aquatic animals, they are not approved by the FDA recently. In common practice, aquatic animals are euthanized through immersion in a tailor-made euthanasia solution. The dissolved active ingredients will be absorbed by fish through ingestion and skin penetration before exerting their effects. Concentration of active ingredients and water quality in the water tank should be considered when choosing appropriate euthanasia drugs for compounding immersion solution.

The formulation of immersion solution varies with the age and the species of the fish. For example, bleach is used to kill the embryos of zebrafish painlessly, whilst lethal doses of anaesthetics, such as ethanol and eugenol, are applied in the immersion solution for adult zebrafish.

== Related issues ==
=== Problems of drugs for human execution ===
There are doubts regarding method reliability, drug potency, and qualification of execution personnel.

First and foremost, allegedly the 3-drug cocktail was not tested for its efficacy and reliability before application. That painful or failed death had been reported raises concerns about the drugs' suitability.

Secondly, the effect of the chosen anaesthetic may be short-lasting and the person being executed may experience a fierce sensation of heart-burning prior to death. Nonetheless, the effect of paralyzing agent prevents the convict from expressing such feeling. As such, lawsuits have been filed against the use of sodium thiopental and paralyzing agents in the execution.

Thirdly, manual errors by untrained execution personnel can be catastrophic to the person being executed. Awareness has been aroused regarding the qualification of personnel involved in carrying out painless execution.

=== Shortage of drugs for human execution ===
Recently, the USA is beset with the shortage of drugs for execution. Firstly, European firms stopped supplying thiopental. Hence, Hospira, the only manufacturer of thiopental products in the US, halted the commercial drug production. The authorities once proposed using pentobarbital. Despite pentobarbital not being normally used for execution, its reliability is considered to be higher owing to its longer-lasting anesthetic effect. Secondly, pentobarbital supply is also limited as European company Lundbeck has ceased selling pentobarbital to the USA since 2011. Unable to import pentobarbital, the authority requested some local pharmacies and institutions to manufacture it. Yet, the quality of local products may not be guaranteed and as revealed by some reports, the products might have been contaminated or were not potent enough.

=== Shortage of drugs for animal euthanasia ===
With the decreased availability of pentobarbital, carrying out animal euthanasia becomes a challenge. While the FDA promised to subsidize some pentobarbital products, vets are looking for replacement drugs. They can administer ketamine, xylazine, and propofol via intravenous injection, or anesthetic for inhalation such as isoflurane and sevoflurane to animals.

==== Pentobarbital overdose ====
Pentobarbital overdose was common in abusing euthanasia solution. Generally, patients purchased pentobarbital-containing commercial products such as Euthasol and Nembutal from online stores and intentionally ingested a lethal dose. Mostly, the patients would collapse and fall into a coma within 30 minutes to 1 hour, then their breathing stopped and cardiac arrest resulted.

Medical treatment:

| Emergency measures used in overdose cases | Possible purpose |
|---|---|
| Cardiopulmonary resuscitation (CPR) | Make the heart beats again |
| Activated charcoal administration | Remove unabsorbed drugs in the stomach |
| Epinephrine injection | Increase heart rate and contractility |
| Intubation | Aid breathing |

The average concentration of pentobarbital accounting for death in these cases was estimated to be 30 mg/L and the above patients had a serum concentration higher than this average value. By early CPR and medical intervention, death was prevented and full recovery was made possible.

== Legal issues ==
This section lists some regulations regarding drug purchase or administration.

| Drugs/Commercial Products | Regulations |
|---|---|
| Barbiturates | CSA schedule II drug; Prescription drug; Administration of drug monitored by DEA's registered personnel |
| Phenytoin | Prescription drug |
| Nembutal | CSA schedule II Drug; Prescription drug (human) |
| Euthasol | CSA schedule III drug; Prescription animal drug; Available to veterinarians only |
| T61 | Sold to licensed Vet/Pharmacist in limited amount (Canada) |
| Thiopental | CSA schedule III drug; Administration only by professionals specializing in intravenous injection of anaesthetics |

Here, DEA refers to the US Drug Enforcement Administration, and CSA refers to Controlled Substance Act.
