= Lethal injection =

Form of execution involving injection of chemicals into the bloodstream

Usage of lethal injection for the death penalty by jurisdiction in the United States in 2025 With the death penalty Jurisdiction uses only this method (12) Jurisdiction uses this method primarily but has other methods (14) (Note: de facto blocked in California since 2019) Jurisdiction uses this method as a secondary method (1) Without the death penalty Jurisdiction once used this method (8) Jurisdiction once adopted this method, but never used it (4) Jurisdiction has never adopted or used this method (11+)

Lethal injection is the practice of injecting one or more drugs into a person (typically a barbiturate, paralytic, and potassium chloride) for the express purpose of causing death. The main application for this procedure is capital punishment, although recently, it also used in Active euthanasia. The drugs cause the person to become unconscious, stop breathing, and develop a cardiac arrest, in that order.

First developed in the United States, the method has become a legal means of execution in China, Thailand, Guatemala, Taiwan, the Maldives, Nigeria, and Vietnam, though Guatemala abolished the death penalty for civilian cases in 2017 and has not conducted an execution since 2000, and the Maldives has never carried out an execution since its independence. Although Taiwan permits lethal injection as an execution method, no executions have been carried out in this manner; the same is true for Nigeria. Lethal injection was also used in the Philippines until the country re-abolished the death penalty in 2006.

Although primarily introduced as a more "humane" method of execution, lethal injection has been subject to criticism, being described by some as cruel and unusual. Opponents particularly critique the operation of lethal injections by untrained corrections officers and the lack of guarantee that the victim will be unconscious in every individual case. There have been instances in which condemned individuals were injected with paralytics and then with a cardiac arrest-inducing agent while still conscious; this technique has been compared to torture. Proponents often say that there is no reasonable or less cruel alternative.

== History ==
Lethal injection gained popularity in the late 20th century as a form of execution intended to supplant electrocution, gas inhalation, hanging and firing squad, which were considered less humane. It has become the most common form of legal execution in the United States.

Lethal injection was proposed on January 17, 1888, by Julius Mount Bleyer, a New York doctor who praised it as being cheaper than hanging. Bleyer's idea would not be revived until the mid-1970s, when Texas and Oklahoma adopted the modern version of the method; a series of botched executions led to an eventual rise of public disapproval of electrocutions in the 1980s. Lethal injections were first used by Nazi Germany to execute prisoners during World War II. Nazi Germany developed the Aktion T4 euthanasia program led by Karl Brandt as one method to terminate Lebensunwertes Leben ("life unworthy of life"). During the war, lethal injections were also administered to children detained at the Sisak concentration camp by the camp's commander, the physician Antun Najžer. The Royal Commission on Capital Punishment 1949–1953 considered lethal injection but eventually ruled it out after pressure from the British Medical Association (BMA).

=== Implementation ===
On May 10, 1977, Oklahoma became the first U.S. state to approve lethal injection when Governor David Boren signed a bill into law. Episcopal Reverend Bill Wiseman had introduced it into the Oklahoma legislature, where it passed and was quickly sent to the Governor's desk (Title 22, Section 1014(A)). The next day, Texas became the second U.S. state to approve a lethal injection law. Since then, until 2004, 37 of the 38 states using capital punishment introduced lethal injection statutes (the last state, Nebraska, maintained electrocution as its sole method until adopting injection in 2009, after its Supreme Court deemed the electric chair unconstitutional).

On May 11, 1977, the day after the new method had become state law, Oklahoma's state medical examiner, Jay Chapman, proposed a new, less painful method of execution known as Chapman's protocol: "An intravenous (IV) saline drip shall be started in the prisoner's arm, into which shall be introduced a lethal injection consisting of an ultrashort-acting barbiturate in combination with a chemical paralytic." The Chapman protocol was approved by anesthesiologist Stanley Deutsch, formerly Head of the Department of Anesthesiology of the University of Oklahoma College of Medicine. On August 29, 1977, Texas adopted the new method of execution, switching from electrocution.

On December 7, 1982, Texas became the first U.S. state or territory in the world to use lethal injection to carry out capital punishment, for the execution of Charles Brooks, Jr.

China began using it in 1997, Guatemala in 1996, the Philippines in 1999, Thailand in 2003, Taiwan in 2005, and Vietnam first used this method in 2013. The Philippines abolished the death penalty in 2006, with their last execution being that of Alex Bartolome in January 2000. All seven executions made from 1999 to 2000 were carried out using lethal injection. Guatemalan law still allows for the death penalty and lethal injection is the sole method allowed, but none have been carried out since 2000 when the country televised the live double executions of Amílcar Cetino Pérez and Tomás Cerrate Hernández.

=== Complications of executions and cessation of supply of lethal injection drugs ===
By early 2014, a number of botched executions involving lethal injection and a rising shortage of suitable drugs had some U.S. states reconsidering lethal injection as a form of execution. Tennessee, which had previously offered inmates a choice between lethal injection and the electric chair, passed a law in May 2014 that gave the state the option to use the electric chair if lethal injection drugs were either unavailable or declared unconstitutional. At the same time, Wyoming and Utah were considering the use of execution by firing squad in addition to other existing execution methods.

In 2016, Pfizer joined over 20 American and European pharmaceutical manufacturers that had previously blocked the sale of their drugs for use in lethal injections, effectively closing the open market for FDA-approved manufacturers for any potential lethal execution drug. In the execution of Carey Dean Moore on August 14, 2018, the State of Nebraska used a novel drug cocktail comprising diazepam, fentanyl, cisatracurium, and potassium chloride, over the strong objections of the German pharmaceutical company Fresenius Kabi.

Potassium acetate had been incorrectly used in place of potassium chloride in Oklahoma in January 2015 for the execution of Charles Frederick Warner. In August 2017, the State of Florida first used the drug in the execution of Mark James Asay using a combination of etomidate, rocuronium bromide, and potassium acetate as part of a new protocol.

As of 2026, seven condemned people had survived medical problems when the executioners could not access a vein, and an eighth, Christa Pike, had survived receiving the drugs, according to Robin M. Maher, executive director of the Death Penalty Information Center.

== Procedures ==
=== Procedure in the United States ===
In the United States, the typical lethal injection begins with the condemned person being strapped onto a gurney; two IV cannulas are then inserted, one in each arm. Only one is necessary to carry out the execution; the other is reserved as a backup in the event the primary line fails. A line leading from the IV line in an adjacent room is attached to the prisoner's IV and secured so that the line does not snap during the injections.

The arm of the condemned person is swabbed with alcohol before the cannula is inserted. The needles and equipment used are sterilized. Although the person is not expected to survive the injection, there are nonetheless reasons to use measures against infection. First, sterile equipment is mass-produced and readily available from medical suppliers. Secondly, the prisoner could receive a stay of execution after the cannulae have been inserted, as in the case of James Autry in October 1983. Third, the use of unsterilized equipment would be a hazard to the prison personnel in case of an accidental needle stick injury.

Following the connection of the lines, saline drips are started in both arms. This, too, is standard medical procedure: it must be ascertained that the IV lines are clear, ensuring the chemicals have not precipitated in them and blocked the needle, preventing the drugs from reaching the subject. A heart monitor is attached to the inmate.

In most states, the IV injection is a series of drugs given in a set sequence, designed to first induce unconsciousness followed by death through paralysis of respiratory muscles and by cardiac arrest through depolarization of cardiac muscle cells. The execution of the condemned in most states involves three separate injections (in sequential order):

1. Sodium thiopental or pentobarbital: ultra-short-action barbiturate, an anesthetic agent used at a high dose that renders the person unconscious in less than 30 seconds. Depression of respiratory activity is one of the characteristic actions of this drug. Consequently, it will—even in the absence of the following two drugs—cause death due to lack of breathing, as happens with overdoses of opioids.
2. Pancuronium bromide: non-depolarizing muscle relaxant, which causes complete, fast, and sustained paralysis of the striated skeletal muscles, including the diaphragm and the rest of the respiratory muscles; this would eventually cause death by asphyxiation.
3. Potassium chloride: a potassium salt, which increases the blood and cardiac concentration of potassium to stop the heart via an abnormal heartbeat and thus cause death by cardiac arrest.

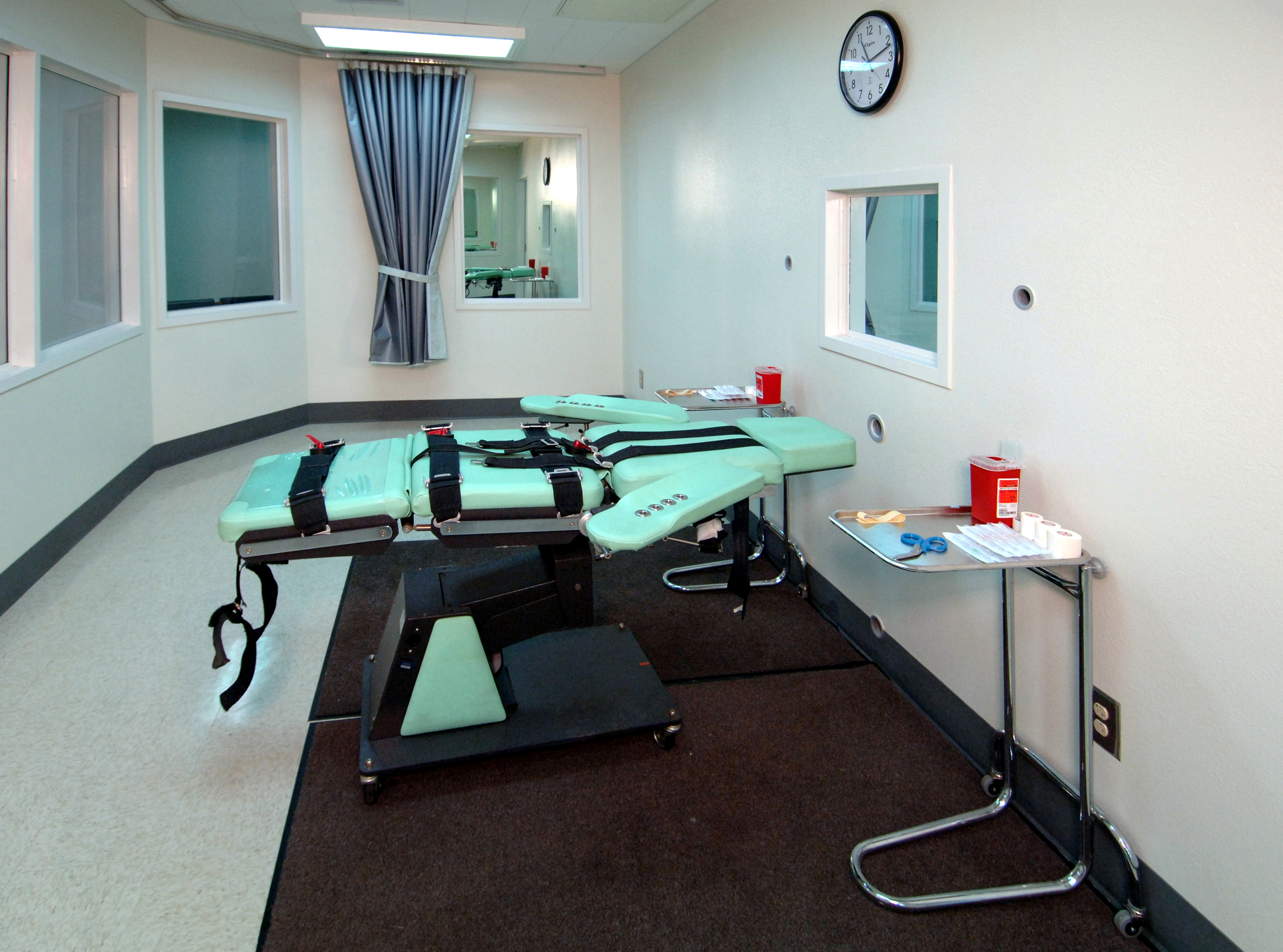
Execution room in the San Quentin State Prison in California

The drugs are administered sequentially rather than together for practical and ethical reasons. A mixture could cause the drugs to precipitate from solution, thereby reducing drug delivery and risking pain due to vascular blockage. The potassium chloride, in particular, would cause severe pain as it travels through the bloodstream and distress as it acts upon the heart, were the person not first rendered fully unconscious.

The intravenous tubing leads to a room next to the execution chamber, usually separated from the condemned by a curtain or wall. Typically, a prison employee trained in venipuncture inserts the needle, while a second prison employee orders, prepares, and loads the drugs into the lethal injection syringes. Two other staff members take each of the three syringes and secure them into the IVs. After the curtain is opened to allow the witnesses to see inside the chamber, the condemned person is then permitted to make a final statement. Following this, the warden signals that the execution may commence, and the executioner(s) (either prison staff or private citizens depending on the jurisdiction) then manually inject the three drugs in sequence. During the execution, the condemned's cardiac rhythm is monitored.

Death is pronounced after cardiac activity stops. Death usually occurs within seven minutes; however, due to complications in finding a suitable vein, the entire procedure can take up to two hours, as was the case with the execution of Christopher Newton on May 24, 2007. According to state law, if a physician's participation in the execution is prohibited for reasons of medical ethics, then the death ruling can be made by the state medical examiner's office. After confirmation that death has occurred, a coroner signs the condemned's death certificate.

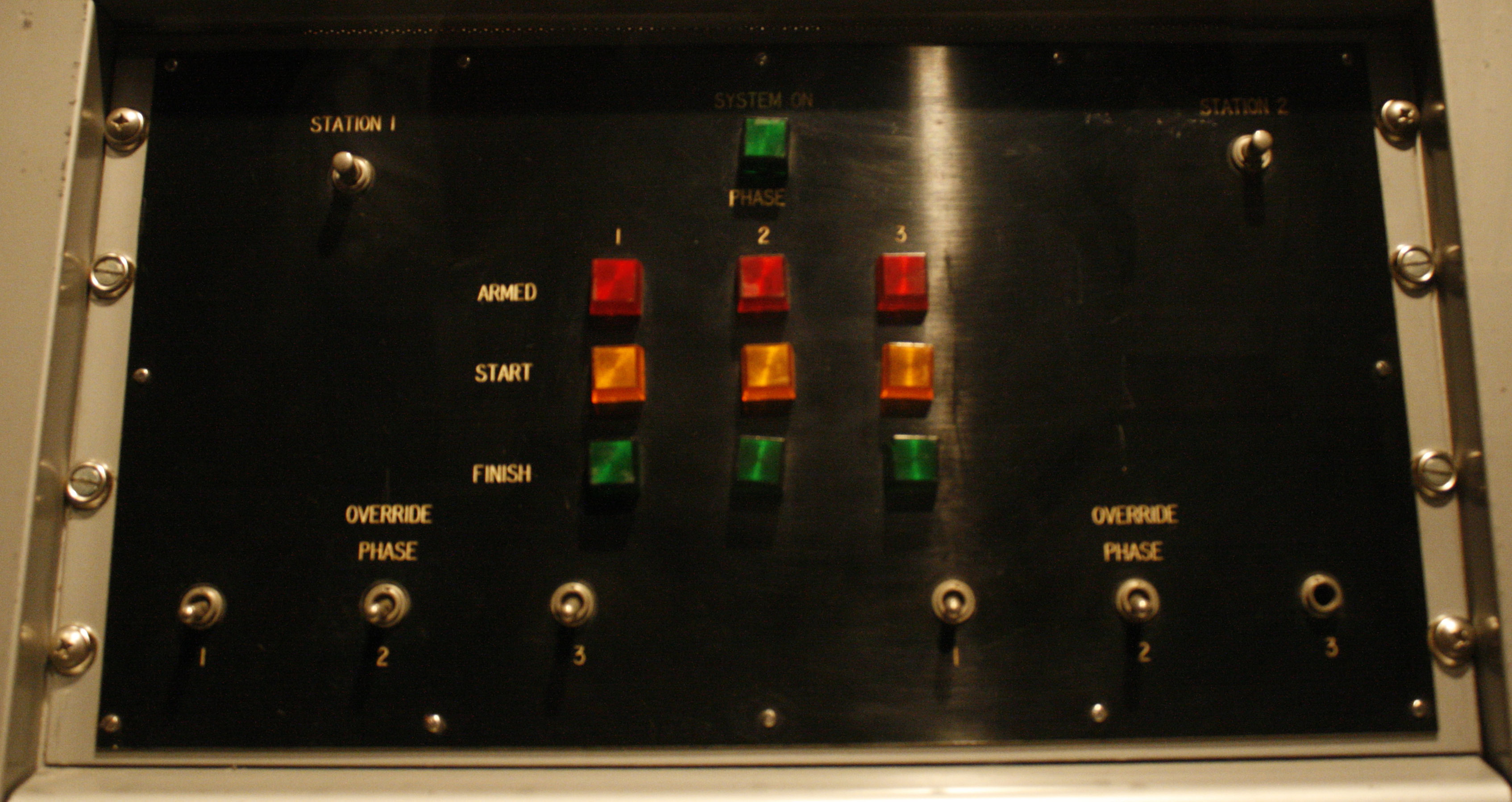
The Control Module of the lethal injection machine formerly installed in the James T. Vaughn Correctional Center, Delaware. On display in the National Museum of Crime & Punishment, Washington, D.C. (2009)

Missouri and, before the abolition of capital punishment, Delaware, use or used a lethal injection machine designed by Massachusetts-based Fred A. Leuchter consisting of two components: the delivery module and the control module. The delivery module is in the execution chamber. It must be preloaded with the proper chemicals and operate with the timing of the dosage. The controller module is in the control room. This section is the portion that officially starts the procedure. The operation is done by first arming the machine and then having station members simultaneously press each of their buttons on the panel to activate the delivery. The computer then deletes the identity of the person who actually started the syringes, so the participants are not aware whether their syringe contained saline or one of the drugs necessary for execution (to assuage guilt in a manner similar to the blank cartridge in execution by firing squad).

The delivery module has eight syringes. The end syringes (i.e., syringes 7 and 8) containing saline, syringes 2, 4 and 6 containing the lethal drugs for the main line and syringes 1, 3 and 5 containing the injections for the backup line. The system was used in New Jersey before the abolition of the death penalty in 2007. Illinois previously used the computer, and Missouri and Delaware use the manual injection switch on the delivery panel.

Eleven states have switched, or have stated their intention to switch, to a one-drug lethal injection protocol. A one-drug method is using the single drug sodium thiopental to execute someone. The first state to switch to this method was Ohio, on December 8, 2009.

In 2011, after pressure from activist organizations, the manufacturers of pentobarbital and sodium thiopental halted the supply of the drugs to U.S. prisons performing lethal injections and required all resellers to do the same.

=== Procedure in China ===
In the past, the People's Republic of China executed prisoners primarily by means of shooting. Recently, lethal injection has become more common. The specific lethal injection procedures, including the drug or drugs used, are a state secret and not publicly known.

Lethal injection in China was legalized in 1996. The number of shooting executions slowly decreased, and in February 2009, the Supreme People's Court ordered the discontinuation of firing squads by the following year under the conclusion that injections were more humane to the prisoner. It has been suggested that the switch is also in response to executions being horrifying to the public. Lethal injections are less expensive than firing squads, with a single dose costing 300 yuan compared to 700 yuan for a shooting execution.

=== Procedure in Vietnam ===
Prior to 2013, shooting was the primary method of execution in Vietnam. The use of lethal injection method was approved by the government in 2010, adopted in 2011, and then started being used in 2013. Urges to adopt other methods than lethal injection to replace the shooting execution began earlier, in 2006, after concerns of the mental state of the firing squad members after executions.

The drugs used consist of sodium thiopental (anesthetic), pancuronium bromide (paralytic), and potassium chloride (cardiotoxin). The production of these substances, however, is low in Vietnam. This led to drug shortages and to considering using other domestic poisons or the readoption of shootings.

The first prisoner in Vietnam to be executed by lethal injection, on August 6, 2013, was 27-year-old Nguyen Anh Tuan, arrested for murder and robbery. Between 2013 and 2016, 429 prisoners were executed by this method in the country.

== Drugs ==
=== Conventional lethal injection protocol ===
Typically, three drugs are used in lethal injection and are administered in the following order: midazolam for sedation, pancuronium bromide (Pavulon) is used to cause muscle paralysis and decreased neural transmission to the lungs, and potassium chloride to stop the heart.

==== Sodium thiopental ====
Sodium thiopental (US trade name: Sodium Pentothal) is an ultra-short-acting barbiturate, often used for anesthesia induction and for medically induced coma. Loss of consciousness is induced within 30–45 seconds at the typical dose, and 10 seconds with a higher dose. A full medical dose of thiopental reaches the brain in about 30 seconds. This induces an unconscious state. Five to twenty minutes after injection, approximately 15% of the drug is in the brain, with the rest in other parts of the body. The half-life of this drug is about 11.5 hours, and the concentration in the brain remains at around 5–10% of the total dose during that time. When a 'mega-dose' is administered, as in state-sanctioned lethal injection, the concentration in the brain during the tail phase of the distribution remains higher than the peak concentration found in the induction dose for anesthesia, because repeated doses—or a single very high dose as in lethal injection—accumulate in high concentrations in body fat, from which the thiopental is gradually released. This is the reason why an ultra-short acting barbiturate, such as thiopental, can be used for long-term induction of medical coma.

Pentobarbital was introduced at the end of 2010 due to a shortage of sodium thiopental, and has since become the primary sedative in lethal injections in the United States.

Barbiturates are the same class of drug used in medically assisted suicide. The dose used for capital punishment is therefore about 3 times more than the dose used in euthanasia.

==== Pancuronium bromide (Pavulon) ====
Pancuronium bromide (Trade name: Pavulon): The related drug curare, like pancuronium, is a non-depolarizing muscle relaxant (a paralytic agent) that blocks the action of acetylcholine at the motor end-plate of the neuromuscular junction. Binding of acetylcholine to receptors on the end-plate causes depolarization and contraction of the muscle fiber; non-depolarizing neuromuscular blocking agents like pancuronium stop this binding from taking place.

The duration of paralysis for a typical capital punishment injection of pancuronium bromide is around 4 to 8 hours. Paralysis of respiratory muscles will lead to death in a considerably shorter time.

Pancuronium bromide is a derivative of the alkaloid malouetine from the plant Malouetia bequaertiana.

Instead of pancuronium, other drugs in use are succinylcholine chloride and tubocurarine chloride.

==== Potassium chloride ====
Potassium is an electrolyte, 98% of which is intracellular. The 2% remaining outside the cell has great implications for cells that generate action potentials. Doctors prescribe potassium for patients when potassium levels in the blood are insufficient, called hypokalemia. The potassium can be given orally, which is the safest route, or it can be given intravenously, in which case strict rules and hospital protocols govern the rate at which it is given.

The usual intravenous dose is given slowly since it takes time for the electrolyte to equilibrate into the cells. When used in a state-sanctioned lethal injection, a bolus potassium injection affects the electrical conduction of heart muscle and ultimately leads to cardiac arrest. The potassium bolus used in lethal injection quickly raises the level of potassium outside the heart muscle cells, causing a condition called hyperkalemia, which disrupts the normal electrical activity of the heart, especially affecting the cells that control the heartbeat. However, potassium's effect on membrane potential is concentration dependent and ultimately occurs in two phases. Concentrations of roughly twice the reference range shorten action potential duration and the refractory period due to an allosteric effect of potassium ions on potassium channels, leading to increased conduction velocity and subsequently quicker potassium efflux, which contributes to quicker repolarization and the mentioned shortening of the refractory period. At these concentrations and beyond, the shortened refractory period and increased resting membrane potential diminish the quantity of voltage-gated sodium channels ready to contribute to rapid phase 0 depolarization due to the inactivation gate requiring further repolarization to open back up. At concentrations of roughly three times the reference range, enough sodium channels remain inactivated to no longer generate an action potential, ultimately leading to no heartbeat.

Depolarizing the muscle cell inhibits its ability to fire by reducing the available number of sodium channels (they are placed in an inactivated state). ECG changes vary depending on serum potassium concentrations and on the individual. Peaked T-waves signifying faster repolarization and potentially instances of early repolarization and phase 2 re-entry (Brugada, Short QT, and Early-Repolarization Syndromes) are evident in the first phase of hyperkalemia. This progresses into a broadening and lengthening of the P wave and PR interval, then eventually disappearance of the P wave, widening of the QRS complex, and finally, asystole. This process can occur in the span of 30 to 60 seconds, but there have been cases of 'botched' procedures, leading to one inmate gasping for air for approximately 10 to 13 minutes.

=== New lethal injection protocols ===
The Ohio protocol, developed after the incomplete execution of Romell Broom, aims to ensure the rapid and painless onset of anesthesia by only using sodium thiopental and eliminating the use of Pavulon and potassium as the second and third drugs, respectively. It also provides for a secondary fail-safe measure using intramuscular injection of midazolam, followed by sufentanil or hydromorphone, in the event intravenous administration of the sodium thiopental proves problematic. The first state to switch to use midazolam as the first drug in a new three-drug protocol was Florida on October 15, 2013. Then on November 14, 2013, Ohio made the same move.

In the brief for the U.S. courts written by accessories, the State of Ohio implies that they were unable to find any physicians willing to participate in the development of protocols for executions by lethal injection, as this would be a violation of medical ethics, such as the Geneva Promise, and such physicians would be thrown out of the medical community and shunned for engaging in such deeds, even if they could not lawfully be stripped of their license.

On December 8, 2009, Kenneth Biros became the first person executed using Ohio's new single-drug execution protocol. He was pronounced dead at 11:47 am EST, 10 minutes after receiving the injection. On September 10, 2010, Washington became the second state to use the single-drug Ohio protocol with the execution of Cal Coburn Brown, who was proclaimed dead within two minutes after receiving the single-drug injection of sodium thiopental. Eight states (Arizona, Georgia, Idaho, Missouri, Ohio, South Dakota, Texas, and Tennessee) have used the single-drug execution protocol. The state of Washington used this single drug method only once, as it later abandoned the death penalty. Four additional states (Arkansas, Kentucky, Louisiana, and North Carolina) announced that they would switch to a single-drug protocol but, as of June 2025, had not executed anyone since switching protocols.

After sodium thiopental began being used in executions, Hospira, the only American company that made the drug, stopped manufacturing it due to its use in executions. The subsequent nationwide shortage of sodium thiopental led states to seek other drugs to use in executions. Pentobarbital, often used for animal euthanasia, was used as part of a three-drug cocktail for the first time on December 16, 2010, when John David Duty was executed in Oklahoma. It was then used as the drug in a single-drug execution for the first time on March 10, 2011, when Johnnie Baston was executed in Ohio.

== Euthanasia protocol ==
Lethal injection has also been used in cases of euthanasia to facilitate voluntary death in patients with terminal or chronically painful conditions. Euthanasia can be accomplished either through oral, intravenous, or intramuscular administration of drugs. In individuals who are incapable of swallowing lethal doses of medication, an intravenous route is preferred because it is the most reliable and rapid way to accomplish euthanasia. A euthanasia machine may allow an individual to perform the process alone.

== Constitutionality in the United States ==
In 2006, the Supreme Court ruled in Hill v. McDonough that death-row inmates in the United States could challenge the constitutionality of states' lethal injection procedures through a federal civil rights lawsuit. Since then, numerous death-row inmates have brought such challenges in the lower courts, claiming that lethal injection as practiced violates the ban on "cruel and unusual punishment" found in the Eighth Amendment to the United States Constitution. Lower courts evaluating these challenges have reached opposing conclusions. For example, courts have found that lethal injection as practiced in California, Florida, and Tennessee is unconstitutional. Other courts have found that lethal injection as practiced in Missouri, Arizona, and Oklahoma is constitutionally acceptable.

In California, a moratorium was imposed on executions in 2006 when a federal court found the state's lethal injection procedures to be unconstitutional. A newer lethal injection facility was built in 2008 at San Quentin State Prison at a cost of over $850,000. However, in 2013, a state court found that the California Department of Corrections and Rehabilitation had attempted to prevent public oversight of new lethal injection procedures, violating the California Administrative Procedure Act. As of 2014, California had nearly 750 prisoners condemned to death. In 2019, Governor Gavin Newsom signed Executive Order N-09-19, placing a moratorium on all executions in California.

On September 25, 2007, the United States Supreme Court agreed to hear a lethal-injection challenge arising from Kentucky, Baze v. Rees. In Baze, the Supreme Court addressed whether Kentucky's particular lethal-injection procedure (using the standard three-drug protocol) comports with the Eighth Amendment; it also determined the proper legal standard by which lethal-injection challenges in general should be judged, all in an effort to bring some uniformity to how these claims are handled by the lower courts. Although uncertainty over whether executions in the United States would be put on hold during the period in which the United States Supreme Court considers the constitutionality of lethal injection initially arose after the court agreed to hear Baze, no executions took place during the period between when the court agreed to hear the case and when its ruling was announced, with the exception of one lethal injection in Texas hours after the court made its announcement.

On April 16, 2008, the Supreme Court rejected Baze v. Rees, thereby upholding Kentucky's method of lethal injection in a majority 7–2 decision. Justices Ruth Bader Ginsburg and David Souter dissented. Several states immediately indicated plans to proceed with executions.

The U.S. Supreme Court also upheld a modified lethal-injection protocol in the 2015 case Glossip v. Gross. By the time of that case, Oklahoma had altered its execution protocol to use midazolam instead of thiopental or pentobarbital; the latter two drugs had become unavailable for executions due to the European embargo on selling them to prisons. Inmates on Oklahoma's death row alleged that the use of midazolam was unconstitutional because the drug was not proven to render a person unconscious as thiobarbital would. The Supreme Court found that the prisoners failed to demonstrate that midazolam would create a high risk of severe pain and that the prisoners had not provided an alternative, practical method of execution that would have a lower risk. Consequently, it ruled that the new method was permissible under the Eighth Amendment.

On March 15, 2018, Russell Bucklew, a Missouri death-row inmate who had been scheduled to be executed on May 21, 2014, appealed the constitutionality of lethal injection on an as-applied basis. The basis for Bucklew's appeal was due to Bucklew's allegation that his rare medical condition would interfere with the effects of the drugs, potentially causing him to choke on his blood. On April 1, 2019, The Supreme Court ruled against Bucklew on the grounds that his proposed alternative to lethal injection, nitrogen hypoxia, was neither "readily implemented" nor established to "significantly reduce a substantial risk of severe pain." Bucklew was executed on October 1, 2019.

== Ethics of lethal injection ==
The American Medical Association (AMA) believes that a physician's opinion on capital punishment is a personal decision. Since the AMA is founded on preserving life, they argue that a doctor "should not be a participant" in executions in any professional capacity with the exception of "certifying death, provided that the condemned has been declared dead by another person" and "relieving the acute suffering of a condemned person while awaiting execution." The AMA, however, does not have the ability to enforce its prohibition of doctors' participation in lethal injection. Medical licensing is handled at the state level; it does not have the authority to revoke medical licenses.

Typically, most states do not require that physicians administer the drugs for lethal injection, but most states do require doctors, nurses or paramedics to prepare the substances before their application and to attest to the inmate's death after it.

Some states specifically detail that participation in a lethal injection is not to be considered practicing medicine. For example, Delaware law reads, "the administration of the required lethal substance or substances required by this section shall not be construed to be the practice of medicine, and any pharmacist or pharmaceutical supplier is authorized to dispense drugs to the Commissioner or the Commissioner's designee, without prescription, for carrying out the provisions of this section, notwithstanding any other provision of law" (excerpt from Title 11, Chapter 42, § 4209). State law allows for the dispensing of the drugs/chemicals for lethal injection to the state's department of corrections without a prescription. However, states are still subject to DEA regulation with respect to lethal injection drugs.

== Controversy ==
=== Opposition ===
Opponents of lethal injection have voiced concerns that abuse, misuse and even criminal conduct are possible when there is not a proper chain of command and authority for the acquisition of death-inducing drugs.

==== Awareness ====
Opponents of lethal injection believe that it is not painless as practiced in the United States. They argue that thiopental is an ultrashort-acting barbiturate that may wear off (anesthesia awareness) and lead to consciousness and an uncomfortable death wherein the inmates are unable to express discomfort because they have been paralyzed by the paralytic agent.

Opponents point to sodium thiopental's typical use as an induction agent and not in the maintenance phase of surgery because of its short-acting nature. Following the administration of thiopental, pancuronium bromide, a paralytic agent, is given. Opponents argue that pancuronium bromide not only dilutes the thiopental but, as it paralyzes the inmate, also prevents the inmate from expressing pain. Additional concerns have been raised over whether inmates are administered an appropriate amount of thiopental owing to the rapid redistribution of the drug out of the brain to other parts of the body.

Additionally, opponents argue that the method of administration is also flawed. They argue that the lack of anesthesia expertise among the personnel administering the lethal injection greatly increases the risk of failure to induce unconsciousness. In reference to this issue, Jay Chapman, the creator of the American method, said, "It never occurred to me when we set this up that we'd have complete idiots administering the drugs". Opponents also argue that the dose of sodium thiopental must be set for each individual patient and not restricted to a fixed protocol. Finally, they contend that remote administration may result in an increased risk that insufficient amounts of the lethal-injection drugs enter the inmate's bloodstream.

In summary, opponents argue that the effect of dilution or of improper administration of thiopental is that the inmate dies an agonizing death through suffocation due to the paralytic effects of pancuronium bromide and the intense burning sensation caused by potassium chloride.

Opponents of lethal injection, as practiced, argue that the procedure is designed to create the appearance of serenity and a painless death, rather than actually providing it. Specifically, opponents object to the use of pancuronium bromide, arguing that it serves no useful purpose in lethal injection since the inmate is physically restrained. Therefore, the default function of pancuronium bromide would be to suppress the autonomic nervous system, specifically to stop breathing.

==== Research ====
In 2005, University of Miami researchers, in cooperation with the attorney representing death-row inmates from Virginia, published a research letter in the medical journal The Lancet. The article presented protocol information from Texas, Virginia, and North and South Carolina, which showed that executioners had no anesthesia training, drugs were administered remotely with no monitoring for anesthesia, data were not recorded, and no peer review was done. Their analysis of toxicology reports from Arizona, Georgia, and North and South Carolina showed that postmortem concentrations of thiopental in the blood were lower than that required for surgery in 43 of 49 executed inmates (88%), and that 21 (43%) inmates had concentrations consistent with awareness. This led the authors to conclude that a substantial probability existed that some of the inmates were aware and suffered extreme pain and distress during execution. The authors attributed the risk of unconsciousness among inmates to the lack of training and monitoring in the process but carefully made no recommendations on how to alter the protocol or how to improve the process. Indeed, the authors conclude, "because participation of doctors in protocol design or execution is ethically prohibited, adequate anesthesia cannot be certain. Therefore, to prevent unnecessary cruelty and suffering, cessation and public review of lethal injections is warranted."

Paid expert consultants on both sides of the lethal-injection debate have found opportunity to criticize the 2005 Lancet article. Subsequent to the initial publication in the Lancet, three letters to the editor and a response from the authors extended the analysis. The issue of contention is whether thiopental, like many lipid-soluble drugs, may be redistributed from blood into tissues after death, effectively lowering thiopental concentrations over time, or whether thiopental may distribute from tissues into the blood, successfully increasing postmortem blood concentrations over time. Given the near absence of scientific, peer-reviewed data regarding thiopental postmortem pharmacokinetics, the controversy continues in the lethal-injection community, and, in consequence, many legal challenges to lethal injection have not used the Lancet article.

In 2007, the same group that authored the Lancet study extended its study of the lethal-injection process through a critical examination of the pharmacology of the barbiturate thiopental. This study – published in the online journal PLOS Medicine – confirmed and extended the conclusions made in the original article and goes further to disprove the assertion that the lethal-injection process is painless.

To date, these two studies by the University of Miami team serve as the only critical peer-reviewed examination of the pharmacology of the lethal-injection process.

==== Cruel and unusual ====
Difficulties inserting the intravenous needles have occurred, with personnel sometimes taking over half an hour to find a suitable vein. Typically, the difficulty is found in convicts with type 2 diabetes or a history of intravenous drug use. Opponents argue that excessive time taken to insert intravenous lines is tantamount to cruel and unusual punishment. In addition, opponents point to instances where the intravenous line has failed or when adverse reactions to drugs or unnecessary delays have happened during the process of execution.

On December 13, 2006, Angel Nieves Diaz was not executed successfully in Florida using a standard lethal-injection dose. Diaz was 55 years old and had been sentenced to death for murder. Diaz did not succumb to the lethal dose even after 35 minutes, necessitating a second dose of drugs to complete the execution. At first, a prison spokesman denied Diaz had suffered pain and claimed the second dose was needed because Diaz had some sort of liver disease. After performing an autopsy, the medical examiner, William Hamilton, stated that Diaz's liver appeared normal, but that the needle had pierced through Diaz's vein into his flesh. The deadly chemicals had subsequently been injected into soft tissue rather than into the vein. Two days after the execution, then-Governor Jeb Bush suspended all executions in the state and appointed a commission "to consider the humanity and constitutionality of lethal injections." The ban was lifted by Governor Charlie Crist when he signed the death warrant for Mark Dean Schwab on July 18, 2007. On November 1, 2007, the Florida Supreme Court unanimously upheld the state's lethal-injection procedures.

A study published in 2007 in PLOS Medicine suggested that "the conventional view of lethal injection leading to an invariably peaceful and painless death is questionable."

The execution of Romell Broom was abandoned in Ohio on September 15, 2009, after prison officials failed to find a vein after two hours of trying on his arms, legs, hands, and ankle. This stirred up more intense debate in the United States about lethal injection. Broom's execution was later rescheduled for March 2022, but he died in 2020 before the sentence could be carried out.

Dennis McGuire was executed in Lucasville, Ohio, on January 17, 2014. According to reporters, McGuire's execution took more than 20 minutes, and he was gasping for air for 10–13 minutes after the drugs had been administered. It was the first use of a new drug combination, which was introduced in Ohio after the European Union banned sodium thiopental exports. This reignited criticism of the conventional three-drug method.

Clayton Lockett died of a heart attack during a failed execution attempt on April 29, 2014, at Oklahoma State Penitentiary in McAlester, Oklahoma. Lockett was administered an untested mixture of drugs that had not previously been used for executions in the U.S. He survived for 43 minutes before being pronounced dead. Lockett convulsed and spoke during the process and attempted to rise from the execution table 14 minutes into the procedure, despite having been declared unconscious.

Lethal injection, by design, is outwardly ambiguous with respect to what can be seen by witnesses. The 8th amendment of the US constitution proscribes cruel punishment, but only the punished can accurately gauge the experience of cruelty. In state-sanctioned executions, the inmate is unable to be a witness to their execution, so it is up to the assembled witnesses to have the final say. Eyewitnesses to execution report very different observations, and these differences range from an opinion that the execution was painless to comments that the execution was highly problematic. Postmortem examinations of inmates executed by lethal injection have revealed a common finding of heavily congested lungs consistent with pulmonary edema. The occurrence of pulmonary edema found at autopsy raises the question about the actual cruelty of lethal injection. If pulmonary edema occurs because of lethal injection, the experience of death may be more akin to drowning than simply the painless death described by lethal injection proponents. Pulmonary edema can only occur if the inmate has heart function; it cannot occur after death.

==== UK and European Union export ban ====
Due to its use for executions in the US, the UK introduced a ban on the export of sodium thiopental in December 2010 [97], after it was established that no European supplies to the US were being used for any other purpose. The restrictions were based on "the European Union Torture Regulation" (including licensing of drugs used in execution by lethal injection). " From December 21, 2011, the European Union extended trade restrictions to prevent the export of certain medicinal products for capital punishment, stating, "The Union disapproves of capital punishment in all circumstances and works towards its universal abolition."

=== Support ===
==== Commonality ====
The combination of a barbiturate induction agent and a nondepolarizing paralytic agent is used in thousands of anesthetics every day. Supporters of the death penalty argue that unless anesthesiologists have been wrong for the past 40 years, the use of pentothal and pancuronium is safe and effective. In fact, potassium is administered during heart bypass surgery to induce cardioplegia. Therefore, the combination of these three drugs remains in use. Supporters of the death penalty speculate that the designers of the lethal-injection protocols intentionally used the same drugs as are used in everyday surgery to avoid controversy. The only modification is that a massive coma-inducing dose of barbiturates is given. In addition, similar protocols have been used in countries that support euthanasia or physician-assisted suicide.

==== Anesthesia awareness ====
Thiopental is a rapid and effective drug for inducing unconsciousness, since it causes loss of consciousness upon a single circulation through the brain due to its high lipophilicity. Only a few other drugs, such as methohexital, etomidate, or propofol, have the capability to induce anesthesia so rapidly. (Narcotics such as fentanyl are inadequate as induction agents for anesthesia.) Supporters argue that since the thiopental is given at a much higher dose than for medically induced coma protocols, it is effectively impossible for the condemned to wake up.

Anesthesia awareness occurs when general anesthesia is inadequately maintained, for a number of reasons. Typically, anesthesia is 'induced' with an intravenous drug but 'maintained' with an inhaled anesthetic given by the anesthesiologist or nurse-anesthetist (note that there are several other methods for safely and effectively maintaining anesthesia). Barbiturates are used only for induction of anesthesia, and although these drugs rapidly and reliably induce anesthesia, they wear off quickly. A neuromuscular-blocking drug may then be given to cause paralysis, which facilitates intubation, although this is not always required. The anesthesiologist or nurse anesthetist is responsible for ensuring that the maintenance technique (typically inhalational) is started soon after induction to prevent the patient from waking up.

General anesthesia is not maintained with barbiturate drugs because they are so short-acting. An induction dose of thiopental wears off after a few minutes because the thiopental redistributes from the brain to the rest of the body very quickly. Also, thiopental has a long half-life, and it needs time for the drug to be eliminated from the body. If a very large initial dose is given, redistribution is minimal because the body is saturated with the drug; thus, recovery of consciousness requires the drug to be eliminated from the body. Because this process is not only slow (taking many hours or days) but also unpredictable in duration, barbiturates are unsatisfactory for the maintenance of anesthesia.

Thiopental has a half-life around 11.5 hours (but the action of a single dose is terminated within a few minutes by redistribution of the drug from the brain to peripheral tissues), and the long-acting barbiturate phenobarbital has a half-life around 4–5 days. In contrast, the inhaled anesthetics have extremely short half-lives and allow the patient to wake up rapidly and predictably after surgery.

The average time to death once a lethal-injection protocol has been started is about 7–11 minutes. The thiopental takes only about 30 seconds to induce anesthesia, the pancuronium takes 30–45 seconds to cause paralysis, and the potassium takes about 30 seconds to stop the heart, so death can theoretically be attained in as little as 90 seconds. Given that it takes time to administer the drug, time for the line to flush itself, time for the change of the drug being administered, and time to ensure that death has occurred, the whole procedure takes about 7–11 minutes. Procedural aspects in pronouncing death also contribute to delay, so the condemned is usually pronounced dead within 10–20 minutes of starting the drugs. Supporters of the death penalty say that a huge dose of thiopental, which is between 14 and 20 times the anesthetic-induction dose and which has the potential to induce a medical coma lasting 60 hours, could never wear off in only 10–20 minutes.

=== Single drug ===
Terminally ill patients in Oregon who have requested physician-assisted suicide have received lethal doses of barbiturates. The protocol has been highly effective in producing a so-called "painless death", but the time required to cause death can be prolonged. Some patients have taken days to die, and a few patients have actually survived the process and have regained consciousness up to three days after taking the supposedly lethal dose. In a California legal proceeding addressing the issue of the lethal-injection cocktail being "cruel and unusual," state authorities said that the time to death following a single injection of a barbiturate could be as much as 45 minutes.

Barbiturate overdoses typically cause death by depression of the respiratory center, but the effect is variable. Some patients may have complete cessation of respiratory drive, whereas others may only have depression of respiratory function. In addition, cardiac activity can last for a long time after cessation of respiration. Since death is pronounced after asystole, and given that the expectation is for a rapid death in lethal injection, multiple drugs are required, specifically potassium chloride to stop the heart. In fact, in the case of Clarence Ray Allen, a second dose of potassium chloride was needed to achieve this.

=== Stockpiling and sourcing of drugs ===
There is a high degree of secrecy around the production and sourcing of the drugs used for lethal injection. Some states, such as Georgia, have passed laws which classify the identities "of people and companies that manufacture, supply, or prescribe drugs used in executions" as state secrets.

Sourcing the drugs (or the ingredients to make them) has also become increasingly difficult. In 2011 and 2012 the U.K. and the European Union banned manufacturers from exporting drugs for use in executions. Domestically, in 2011 drug manufacturers themselves also began blocking their products from being used in executions; Pfizer, the last-remaining open-market manufacturer of drugs used in lethal injections, also banned such uses of its products in 2016.

A 2017 study found that just four U.S. states which allow for capital punishment were stockpiling drugs to use in execution which were in short supply and could be used for life-saving medical procedures elsewhere. The study found that the four states had stockpiled sufficient quantities of medicine to "treat 11,257 patients in surgeries and other possibly life-or-death procedures, for executions".

At least one alleged supplier, Absolute Standards, is neither registered with the FDA, nor registered as a controlled substances manufacturer with the DEA, and has seen investigations over its alleged involvement. Absolute Standards is not registered with the DEA because the chemicals they normally produce are not intended for use in humans or animals. However in September 2018, Absolute Standards applied for approval from the DEA to become a so-called "bulk manufacturer" of a single controlled substance; pentobarbital. A few weeks later, an unnamed company described as a "bulk manufacturer" began producing raw pentobarbital powder for the Justice Department.

In 2025, during a review of the state of Arizona's lethal injection protocols ordered by Governor Katie Hobbs, an investigator found eight unmarked glass jars, each containing a white substance, in a locked refrigerator at an Arizona Department of Corrections facility. The agency said this was their supply of pentobarbital salt, which had been used during executions. The contents of the refrigerator was described in a legal declaration as "enough poison to kill every Death Row prisoner in the United States and then some". Staff at the facility would not answer questions about how long it had been there, due to state secrecy laws, but allegedly told the investigator "that the pentobarbital salt can last forever". However, "Kelley Henry, a federal defender in Tennessee, claims she was told by the drug manufacturer, Absolute Standards, that the salt is unstable, needs to be refrigerated and has a shelf life of 2½ years."

== See also ==
- Capital punishment by country
- Drug injection
- Execution methods
- Execution chamber
- List of people executed by lethal injection
