= Secobarbital =

Barbiturate

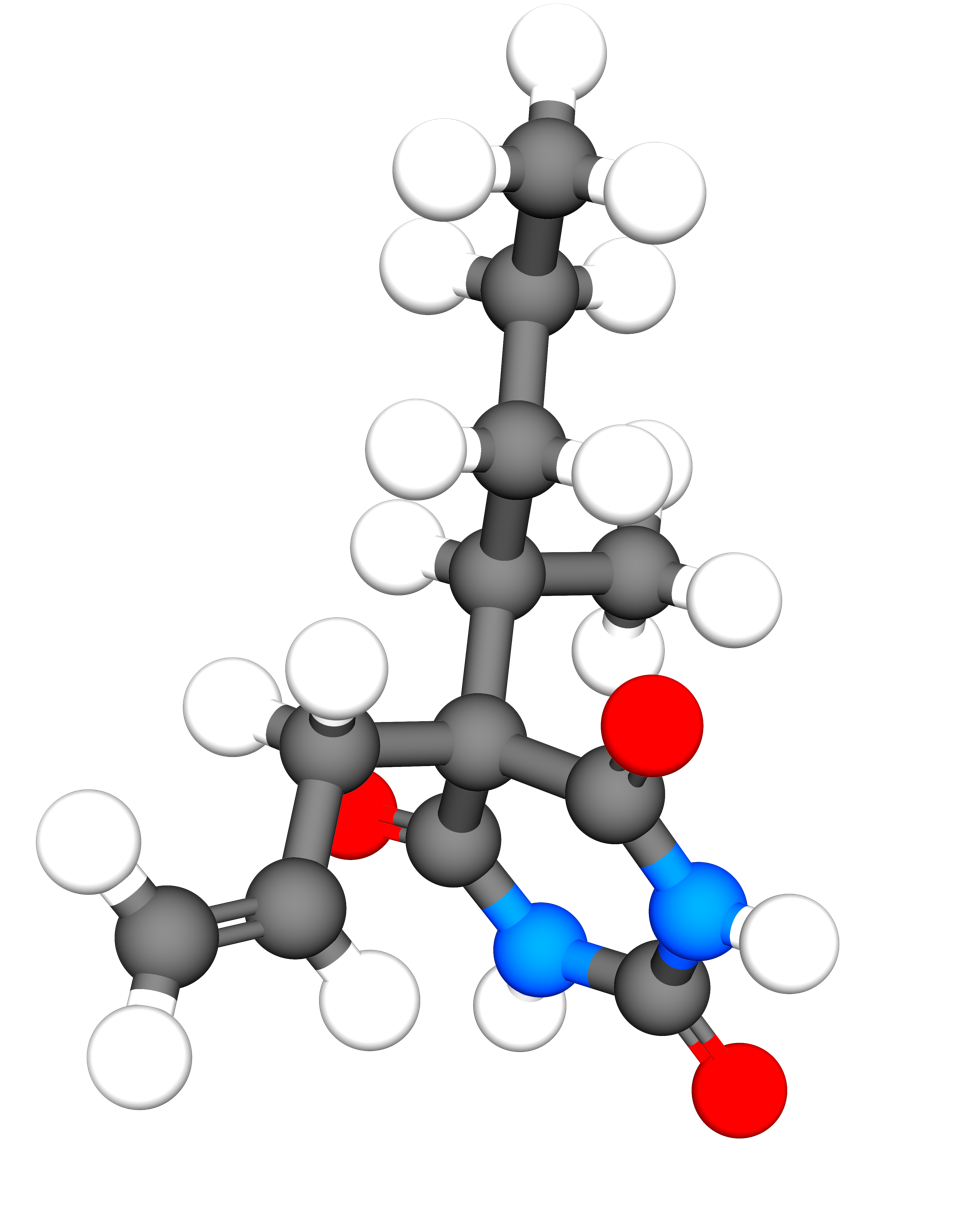

Clinical data
- Trade names: Seconal, others
- Other names: Quinalbarbitone
- AHFS/Drugs.com: Consumer Drug Information
- MedlinePlus: a682386
- Pregnancy category: D (United States)
- Dependence liability: High
- Addiction liability: High
- Routes of administration: By mouth, intravenous
- Drug class: Barbiturate
- ATC code: N05CA06 (WHO) QN51AA02 (WHO)

Legal status
- Legal status: BR: Class B1 (Psychoactive drugs); CA: Schedule IV; DE: Anlage III (Special prescription form required); UK: Class B; US: Schedule II except when combined in a dosage unit with another active drug (in which case Schedule III); UN: Psychotropic Schedule II

Pharmacokinetic data
- Bioavailability: ?
- Protein binding: 45–60%
- Metabolism: Hepatic
- Elimination half-life: 15–40 hours
- Excretion: Renal

Identifiers
- IUPAC name: (RS)-5-(pentan-2-yl)-5-(prop-2-en-1-yl)-1,3-diazinane-2,4,6-trione
- CAS Number: 76-73-3
- PubChem CID: 5193
- IUPHAR/BPS: 7615
- DrugBank: DB00418
- ChemSpider: 5005
- UNII: 1P7H87IN75
- KEGG: D00430
- ChEBI: CHEBI:9073
- ChEMBL: ChEMBL447
- CompTox Dashboard (EPA): DTXSID6044145
- ECHA InfoCard: 100.000.894

Chemical and physical data
- Formula: C_{12}H_{18}N_{2}O_{3}
- Molar mass: 238.287 g·mol^{−1}
- 3D model (JSmol): Interactive image
- SMILES: O=C1NC(NC(C1(CC=C)C(CCC)C)=O)=O
- InChI: InChI=1S/C12H18N2O3/c1-4-6-8(3)12(7-5-2)9(15)13-11(17)14-10(12)16/h5,8H,2,4,6-7H2,1,3H3,(H2,13,14,15,16,17); Key:KQPKPCNLIDLUMF-UHFFFAOYSA-N

Secobarbital, sold under the brand name Seconal among others, is a short-acting barbiturate drug originally used for the treatment of insomnia. It was patented by Eli Lilly and Company in 1934 in the United States. It possesses anesthetic, anticonvulsant, anxiolytic, sedative, and hypnotic properties. In the United Kingdom, it was known as quinalbarbitone. Secobarbital is considered to be an obsolete sedative–hypnotic (sleeping pill) and has largely been replaced by the benzodiazepine family. It was widely abused, known on the street as "red devils" or "reds". Among barbiturates, secobarbital carries a particularly high risk of abuse and addiction, largely responsible for its deprecation and disuse by the 1970s.

== Uses ==
=== Medical ===
Secobarbital is used for managing symptoms of epilepsy and for short-term treatment of insomnia. It is also used as a preoperative medication to produce anesthesia and anxiolysis for short surgical, diagnostic, or therapeutic procedures which are minimally painful.

=== Recreational ===
Secobarbital was widely abused for recreational purposes in the 1960s, 1970s, and 1980s, and accidental overdose was associated with the drug. Lilly's Seconal came in a bright orange/red bullet-shaped capsule known as a Pulvule. Prescription use of secobarbital decreased beginning in the early 1980s, by which time benzodiazepines had become increasingly common. Secobarbital has acquired many nicknames, the most common being "reds," "red devils," or "red dillies" (because of the color of the capsules). Other common nicknames are "seccies," "Cardinals," "ruby slippers," and, according to the Wegman's School of Pharmacy curriculum, "red hearts". A less common nickname is "dolls"; this was partly responsible for the title of Jacqueline Susann's novel Valley of the Dolls, whose main characters use secobarbital and other such drugs.

=== Assisted dying ===
==== Human ====
Secobarbital is used in assisted dying, either euthanasia or palliative sedation.

In the Netherlands, individuals have two options for assisted dying: they can orally consume 100 mL of concentrated syrup containing either 15 grams of pentobarbital or 15 grams of secobarbital, or they can choose to have 2 grams of thiopental or 1 gram of propofol administered intravenously by a doctor, followed by a muscle relaxant. As of 2010, only 15% of those who died by physician-assisted suicide opted for orally consuming the lethal drugs, with the rest choosing to have the drugs administered intravenously by a doctor instead.

In the United States, secobarbital and pentobarbital are the most common drugs prescribed under physician aid-in-dying laws in Oregon since 1998, Washington since 2008, and Vermont since 2013.

In 2017, secobarbital was made available for physician-assisted suicide in Canada.

==== Animal ====
It is a component in the veterinary drug Somulose, used for euthanasia of horses and cattle.

The LD_{50} of secobarbital has been reported to be between 125 mg/kg (rat, oral) and 267 mg/kg (mouse, oral).

== Adverse effects ==
Possible side effects of secobarbital include:

- Somnolence
- Dizziness
- Impaired motor functions
  - Impaired coordination
  - Impaired balance
- Anxiety
- Confusion
- Irritability
- Headache
- Increased appetite
- Nausea
- Vomiting
- Nightmares
- Increased sensitivity to pain
- Allergic reactions
  - Difficulty breathing
  - Edema
  - Urticaria

=== Withdrawal ===
Secobarbital may produce psychological addiction and produces physical dependence if used for an extended period of time. Withdrawal symptoms may occur if long-term use is abruptly ended and can include:

- Anxiety
- Insomnia
- Decreased appetite
- Seizures
- Tremors
- Possible death as a result of withdrawal

== Society and culture ==
=== Availability ===
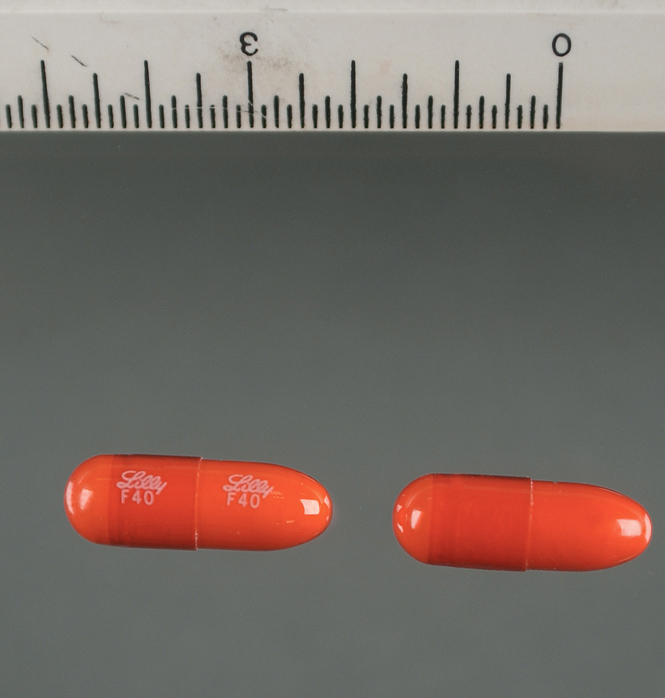
Secobarbital sodium, 100 mg

Ranbaxy Pharmaceuticals, an India-based company predominantly owned by the Japanese company Daiichi Sankyo, obtained the rights to market and to use the trade name Seconal from Eli Lilly in 1998 and did so until September 2008. The actual manufacturer of Seconal subsequent to the time Eli Lilly manufactured the drug was Ohm Pharmaceuticals, a wholly owned subsidiary of Ranbaxy. The rights to market Seconal were then sold to Marathon Pharmaceuticals, which became the marketer and trade-name holder. At the time Marathon Pharmaceuticals obtained ownership of the brand name, the retail price for one 100 mg capsule (depending upon prescription size and pharmacy) averaged about one U.S. dollar. During the time Marathon owned the brand name, the company greatly increased the price of the drug. By February 2015, when Marathon sold the rights to Valeant Pharmaceuticals, the average retail price per 100 mg capsule had risen to over thirty dollars. Since its acquisition of the trade name, Valeant Pharmaceuticals made little, if any, change to the pricing of Seconal. Despite the price increases implemented by Marathon Pharmaceuticals, Seconal was still manufactured by Ohm. In the United States, Seconal is available only in 100 mg capsules, as a sodium salt. The salt is a white hygroscopic powder that is soluble in water and ethanol.

While generic versions of the drug became available after Eli Lilly's patent on Seconal expired, no companies manufacture the drug anymore in the United States. Until 2020, Valeant was the sole marketer of Seconal in the United States. As of 2021, Valeant discontinued the product, and Bausch Health became the sole supplier of Seconal. Bausch Health stopped manufacturing the product in January 2022.

=== Overdose and lethal use ===
Actresses Carole Landis, Judy Garland, Lupe Vélez, Anissa Jones, actor Charles Boyer, playwright Tennessee Williams, table tennis star Ruth Aarons, Iranian princess Leila Pahlavi, singer Dinah Washington and journalist Dorothy Kilgallen allegedly either died by suicide or of accidentally overdosing on secobarbital. Seconal was used to induce Fred Hampton into a stupor before he was then killed in his bed by Chicago police in the early hours of December 4, 1969.

In 1978, 1,000 pills of Seconal were recovered in Jonestown, along with substantial quantities of Valium, Thorazine, Talwin, Demerol, and other sedatives, hypnotics, and analgesics.

== See also ==
- Tuinal (secobarbital/amobarbital)
- Amobarbital
- Pentobarbital
