= Monkey Drug Trials =

Series of controversial experiments in 1969

The Monkey Drug Trials of 1969 were a series of controversial animal testing experiments that were conducted on primates to study the effects of various psychoactive substances. The trials shed light on the profound effects of drug addiction and withdrawal in primates, pioneering critical insights into human substance abuse.

== Background ==
The Monkey Drug Trials experiment was influenced by preceding research discussing related topics. Six notable research publications may be highlighted: “Factors regulating oral consumption of an opioid (etonitazene) by morphine-addicted rats”; “Experimental morphine addiction: Method for automatic intravenous injections in unrestrained rats.”; ”Morphine self-administration, food-reinforced, and avoidance behaviors in rhesus monkeys''; “Psychopharmacological elements of drug dependence”; “Drug addiction. I. Addiction by escape training”; “Morphine addiction in rats”.

== Experiments ==
The study “Self-Administration of Psychoactive Substances by the Monkey” was conducted by G. Deneau, T. Yanagita and M.H. Seever at the department of pharmacology at the University of Michigan.

The monkey drug trials consisted of self-injection of intravenous drugs in monkeys, in which the primates were trained to operate the self-administration of cocaine, morphine, amphetamines, codeine, caffeine, mescaline, pentobarbital, ethanol, by using a lever in their cage. Their responses to the drugs over time were carefully analyzed to assess whether monkeys, after initial exposure to it, will show a voluntary intake of it, indicating psychological dependencies.

The results suggested that some drugs elicited signs of dependency while others did not. They were compared with human dependency problems aiming to find an explanation of physiological and psychological drug dependence in humans. These trials had some drastic side effects like tremors, hallucinations, convulsions, sudden death and disorientation. Criticism of it, along with several other experiments of which the morals were highly criticized, led to the development of guidelines for guidelines for Ethical Conduct in the Care and Use of Animals provided by the American Psychological Association.

=== Procedure ===
Monkeys selected as experiment subjects were kept in specially-built cubicles. Inside the booths, monkeys were restrained by a harness attached to a restraining arm mounted on the wall. Upon acclimation of the monkey to the new environment, the harness was adjusted to fit the size of the animal. A silicone catheter was inserted into the monkey’s jugular vein under anesthesia and fixed in place. The other end of the catheter was attached to a tube running through the harness to an injector.

After the monkey recovered from the catheter installation, two switches were placed inside the cubicle. Pressing one of the switches activated the injector and saline was injected into the vein of the monkey. Upon pressing the other switch, saline was transported back from the injector to the container. After the monkey learned to operate the self-administration mechanism, saline was switched to a drug solution. Drug injections could be administered by the monkey or a timer.

If the drug had rewarding effects on the monkey, it increased the self-administration rate as pressing the switch would be associated with a pleasant experience. If the experience was perceived negatively, the monkey avoided pressing the switch.

In the event of the monkey not initiating drug injections, the solution was administered automatically at regular intervals to test if upon further exposure, the monkey would begin to press the switch on its own, signaling psychological dependence on the drug.

== Results ==
Morphine: Some monkeys expressed an initial reluctance to self-administer morphine at lower doses, but they eventually began and maintained a consistent intake of it, some even significantly increasing the dosage throughout the experiment. None of the monkeys voluntarily ceased their morphine intake during the study, and when this drug was taken away from them they expressed symptoms of severe dependence. Some of the side effects observed during the monkeys’ morphine consumption were drowsiness, apathy, reduced food intake, and temporary weight loss.

Codeine: Four out of five monkeys initiated level-pressing for codeine, gradually increasing its intake until achieving a stable consumption between the fifth and sixth week of the experiment. One monkey experienced convulsions and died after reaching the highest observed daily dosage of 600 mg/kg, and the other four died between the sixth and eighth week of unrestricted codeine consumption.

Nalorphine: Due to the monkey’s experience with the first drug trial, they refused to administer themselves drugs out of their own free will. So they were injected every four hours for the whole period of the trial. During the trial the monkeys were less active, somewhat apprehensive and salivated mildly for 10–15 minutes. Once the trial ended and the monkeys were taken off the drugs they yawned excessively and scratched for 2 days.

Morphine-Nalorphine mixture: Four monkeys were tested with a mixture of both drugs, these monkeys had shown psychological dependence but had not been allowed to self-administer morphine. None of the monkey voluntarily self-administered the mixture.

Cocaine: Two out of four monkeys started self-administration with a dose of 0.25 mg/kg, and the others started with a dose of 1.0 mg/kg that they maintained throughout the experiment. Once self-administration began, the cocaine consumption rapidly increased, leading to convulsions and death within 30 days. To extend the experiment, the self-administration dose was restricted to one dose per hour, and the consequent pattern was monkeys self-administering until exhaustion, after which they voluntarily ceased their cocaine intake for a period ranging from 12 hours to 5 days. During this period of voluntary restriction, monkeys slept intermittently and ate frequently. Cocaine consumption resulted in secondary effects such as hallucinations, muscle mass loss, and frequent grand mal convulsions.

Morphine-cocaine: Four monkeys had 2 tubes implanted, where one supplied morphine and one supplied cocaine, with corresponding lever switches which could be pressed as pleased. Quite shortly after, the monkeys developed dependency, primarily using cocaine during the day and morphine during the evening/night. Combined toxic effects of these drugs created disorientation, delirium, anorexia, motor impairment, emaciation and eventually death after 2–4 weeks.

The Amphetamines: Five monkeys voluntarily self-administered a maximum dose of methamphetamine. The intake was infrequent with periods of voluntary withdrawal and periods of high intake daily and nightly. D-amphetamine had similar but milder effects than cocaine, lacking especially grand convulsions, chewing of forearms and digits. Hair was plucked from one monkey’s body by themselves leading to believe the hallucinations might have been present. Just as in cocaine the monkeys became confused and a catabolic effect was observed in both cocaine and amphetamines.

Caffeine: Four monkeys were placed in a caffeine trial, where two failed self-administration of 1.0 mg/kg, one failed self-administration at 2.5 mg/kg and one did initiate self administration at this level, and one monkey initiated self-administration at 5.0 mg/kg. One monkey self-administered voluntarily and two did with priming. The pattern following self-administration was sporadic and with irregular intervals of administration and abstinence. No tendency to heighten the dose or to take the drug at night was shown, and once the drug was withdrawn no signs of withdrawal were visible with the monkeys.

Mescaline: The monkeys either did not self-administer mescaline or started doing so after one month of programmed administration. Effects observed were salivation indicating nausea although no monkeys vomited, mydriasis and piloerection. The monkeys were also very apprehensive of sounds. No abstinence signs were observed during programmed administration.

Pentobarbital: Five monkeys initiated and maintained self-administration of 3 mg/kg doses of pentobarbital. They constantly self-administered as soon as the last dose enabled them to re-administer, reaching a tolerance plateau of 420 mg/kg per week. All monkey’s abstained during meals, which were larger than average. The monkeys maintained good physical condition, gaining weight throughout the experiment. They never voluntarily abstained and when abstinence was forced, abstinence syndrome was observed with symptoms of extreme restlessness, tremors, grand mal convulsions and apparent hallucinations.

Ethanol: Four out of five monkeys administered ethanol voluntarily, where one of four completely stopped self-administering after one month. Despite severe abstinence syndrome, the monkeys voluntarily abstained for 2–4 days during the first 4 months. Afterwards these periods were usually no more than a day. Effects observed included severe motor incoordination and stupor, sometimes to the point of light anesthesia. Withdrawal periods also induced symptoms of tremor, vomiting, hallucinatory behavior and convulsions within 6 hours after the last dose. Food intake was also severely deprived, showing marked weight loss and cachexia. Two monkeys died because of respiratory obstruction during anesthesia.

Chlorpromazine: None of six monkeys willingly self-administered chlorpromazine, and received programmed injections. After withdrawal though, two monkeys willingly self-administered 2-5 times a day and then abstained completely after several weeks. Effects during administration included typical phenothiazine effects of reduced spontaneous activity and responsiveness, narrowed palpebral fissures and slight miosis, but no major dyskinesias were observed. No withdrawal signs were observed either.

Saline: No attempt during the study to establish saline as a reinforcing agent was successful.

== Limitations ==
Limitations the experimenters Deneau et al. mentioned in their paper about Self-Administration of Psychoactive Drugs by the Monkey include that the study was not able to test drugs that are not water soluble. This limited research of substances like the active ingredients of marijuana. In the paper it was also noted, that the individual variability in drug abuse of the individual monkeys, may affect the reliability of the results.

When discussing the concept of self-administration for inferring abuse potential it is essential to consider the toxicity of the drug when it is administered as well as the withdrawal-effects once usage is stopped. The experiment mainly focused on the self-administration and not on the withdrawal-period or detailed effects that the drugs had on the body. Abuse potential as well as a drugs potential danger is not only determined by self-administration but by several factors that were not taken into account when the study was conducted.

An additional point of criticism raised by primatologists is the limitation of generalizing results from data obtained on non-human primates onto humans. There are possible biases that can emerge through, for example, the environment the monkeys are being placed in or connected traumas resulting from the replacement of their previous environment to the laboratory.

== Ethics ==
Experiments using Non-Human Primates (NHPs) are viewed more critically in years following 1969, when the study of Self-Administration of Psychoactive Substances by the Monkey was conducted.

The bioethicist Peter Singer, for example, argues that there should be no use of any animal in biomedical research as this would indicate speciesism. It is often argued that animals lack sentience, autonomy and self-consciousness, which is utilized to justify the use of animals in scientific experiments. Singer draws the comparison of humans that lack these traits and argues that if one is morally able to deprive an animal of their rights based on this argument, one would also be entitled to depriving said humans of the same rights and privileges.

More specific to the experiment of Self-Administration of Psychoactive Substances by the Monkey which utilized rhesus monkeys, there is the factor of a substantial phylogenetic proximity between non-human primates and humans which indicates that the suffering endured by NHPs in these experiments is similar to what a human would experience under the same circumstances.

Some argue that this phylogenetic proximity between NHPs and humans is exactly what benefits comparative psychology, in which it is thus easier to infer from the animal to humans. The drug self-administration procedures that occur in animals have been found to present valid and reliable results for assessing the potential drug abuse in humans. The reliability of these studies is particularly high because of the phylogenetic similarity.

Carl Cohen, a bioethicist, suggests that as long as animals are killed by humans daily, simply for consumption, even though this is unnecessary due to modern scientific developments, there would be no reason not to utilize animals in scientific experiments.

A utilitarian argument to justify this further would be that there are relatively few NHPs used in research, compared to the relatively large number of people benefitting.

The Institution of Harvard Medical School, when talking about a different ethically-questioned experiment using NHPs, stated:

As long as non-human primates are used in scientific experiments, we are morally obligated to provide them with sufficient social conditions that ensure their emotional well-being.

== Legacy and aftermath ==
The monkey drug trials were not the first nor the last experiment of its kind. Using animals to assess the effects of addiction and withdrawal was a relatively common practice during Deneau’s time, with monkeys and rats being the most prevalent subjects. Notably, Charles Schuster’s studies on drug self-administration were critical in demonstrating the highly addictive nature of stimulant substances. The cruelty and disregard for the animals displayed by the experimenters during the 1969 drug trials were the key contributor in the controversy that followed.

The experiment had a profound impact on the field of neuroscience and addiction research, leading to lasting changes in research practices, ethical considerations, and public perception.

In spite of the criticism that accompanied the publication of the study, subsequent research did provide valuable insights into addiction-driven behaviors. In the following decades, articles focusing on the biological processes underlying drug-addiction grew in popularity. Respected scientists, such as George Koob and Nora Volkov, were at the forefront of new discoveries in addiction neuroscience and the pharmacology of behavior. Research also explored the clinical aspects of addiction-related behaviors, with experiments aimed at reducing the likelihood of relapse in patients.

While self-administered drug trials were not a novelty in the last century, the validity and efficiency of such procedures have since become a subject of debate in the scientific community. The use of animals in studies exploring the effects of various substances was still prevalent by the end of the 20th century.

== See also ==
- Cambridge University primates
- Silver Spring monkeys
