= Absolute Standards =

Chemical company

Absolute Standards Inc.
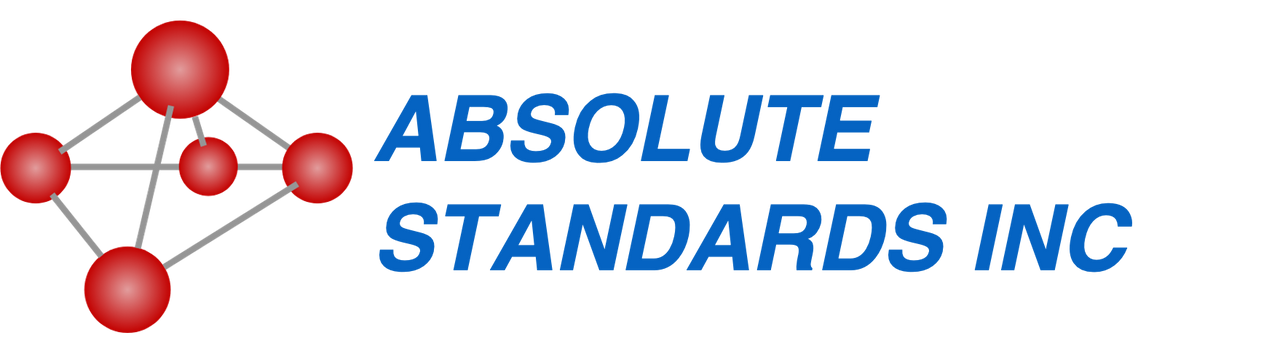
- Industry: Chemicals
- Founded: September 1, 1990; 35 years ago
- Headquarters: Hamden, Connecticut
- Key people: Stephen J. Arpie (Director); John P. Criscio (CEO & President)
- Products: Calibration chemicals
- Owner: John P. Criscio
- Number of employees: 21 (2020)
- Website: www.absolutestandards.com

Absolute Standards Inc. is a chemical company that makes chemical samples for use in calibrating laboratory testing equipment. The company is suspected to be a supplier of execution drugs for the Federal government of the United States.

Absolute Standards is not registered with the Food and Drug Administration (FDA), nor is it registered as a controlled substances manufacturer with the Drug Enforcement Administration (DEA). Therefore, despite allegedly producing ingredients for lethal injections, Absolute Standards is not authorized to produce drugs for human consumption.

== Products ==
=== Calibration Chemicals ===
Absolute Standards advertises itself as producing over 2,000 calibration chemical products designed to assist with the testing and analysis of instruments used in laboratories, and claims to ship their products to all fifty U.S. states, several territories, and over thirty countries.

=== Pentobarbital ===
Absolute Standards applied to be registered as a bulk manufacturer of pentobarbital on September 29, 2018, and again on August 25, 2021, according to Drug Enforcement Administration notices. The first notice stated that the company planned to bulk manufacture the substance for distribution to customers, while the 2021 notice mentioned that the company intended to bulk manufacture the controlled substances "for internal use and sale to its customers."

In May 2024, Absolute Standards president John P. Criscio sent a letter to Connecticut state senator Saud Anwar and state representative Josh Elliott informing them that had company had ceased the manufacture and sale of pentobarbital in December 2020, marking the first written acknowledgment by Criscio that the company had been manufacturing pentobarbital, and stating that the company had no intention of resuming its production.

Apart from its use in lethal injections, pentobarbital can also treat tension, anxiety, insomnia, epilepsy, and other seizures. Additionally, it can be used to help patients relax before surgery. Absolute Standards, however, provides chemical standards to chemical testing laboratories and isn't a provider of drugs for pharmaceutical or hospital use.

== Investigations ==
In 2020, Reuters suspected that Absolute Standards, based on a letter signed by Democratic Party members of the US House Oversight Committee, was the manufacturer of a raw, powdered form of pentobarbital for the Justice Department. According to Reuters, the department has confirmed hiring a pharmacy to mix this powder into a sterile, injectable solution. When asked about the claims, Stephen Arpie (Director) told Reuters that they "don't know what the final intended use" of their products is going to be.

In April 2021, Jennifer Lamb, the district director for Congresswoman Rosa DeLauro, wrote to Connecticut Attorney General William Tong about Absolute Standards, saying, “It appears the company may have supplied the US Department of Justice with ingredients used to make pentobarbital for use in federal executions." In May 2021, Tong wrote to Absolute Standards requesting details about the company’s activities, expressing concern that the company might “also be providing pentobarbital, or contemplating providing the drug, for use by individual states in their attempts to execute human beings.”

On a 2024 episode of the television series Last Week Tonight, Absolute Standards was again accused of supplying pentobarbital to the federal government. This claim was based on information from a confidential source and a Freedom of Information request filed with the DEA in 2020. The processing of this request was significantly delayed, reportedly due to the documents being "related to the death penalty," according to an agency liaison.

In a separate investigation, The Intercept requested records detailing communications between the South Carolina Department of Corrections and Absolute Standards. This was following the announcement in September 2023 by South Carolina officials that the state had secured pentobarbital for carrying out executions by lethal injection. The Department of Corrections replied that the information requested was exempt from disclosure, due in part to a state secrecy law that shields the identity of people and companies involved in executions. The Intercept also cites two unnamed sources, both of whom report being told by Stephen Arpie and John Criscio that Absolute Standards made drugs for executions.
