= Phenytoin/pentobarbital =

Veterinary euthanasia drug

Combination of
- Phenytoin: Sodium channel blocker
- Pentobarbital: Barbiturate

Clinical data
- Trade names: Beuthanasia-D Special
- Routes of administration: Intravenous injection
- ATCvet code: QN51AA51 (WHO)

Legal status
- Legal status: US: Veterinary prescription only, Schedule III

Phenytoin/pentobarbital (trade name Beuthanasia-D Special) is an animal drug product used for euthanasia, which contains a mixture of phenytoin and pentobarbital. It is administered as an intravenous injection to give animals a quick and humane death.

Generics of this product are also available under the names Euthasol, Euthanasia-III Solution and Somnasol.

== Composition ==
The two active ingredients, phenytoin and pentobarbital are present as salts of sodium. In addition, Rhodamine B dye is added to clearly distinguish the solution. Benzyl alcohol is added to slow bacterial growth, though this does not make the solution sterile.

Euthasol has the following composition: 390 mg/mL pentobarbital sodium, 50 mg/mL phenytoin sodium, 10% ethyl alcohol, 18% propylene glycol, 0.003688 mg/mL Rhodamine B, 2% benzyl alcohol, water and sodium hydroxide and hydrochloric acid as needed to achieve desired pH.

== Mechanism of action ==
This drug combination causes painless and rapid euthanasia through multiple pathways, including brain death, cessation of breathing and circulatory collapse. Brain death is observed first. Breathing generally stops within seconds. However, euthanasia may be delayed in dogs that have deficient cardiac and circulatory function.

The pentobarbital component produces anaesthesia and rapid unconsciousness. A lethal dose causes loss of medullary respiration and vasomotor function.

The phenytoin component produces reduced central nervous system function and cardiovascular collapse, causing hypotension.

== Veterinary use ==
When used to euthanize dogs, intravenous injection is preferred, though intracardiac injection may be used in some circumstances, for example, if the animal is very small or comatose with impaired circulatory function.

== Hazards ==
This product is hazardous both to humans and wildlife, whether due to accidental consumption (e.g. by scavengers eating a body of an animal euthanized with phenytoin/pentobarbital), exposure to wounds, or accidental self-injection.

== Society and culture ==
In the US, it is classified by the Drug Enforcement Administration (DEA) as a Schedule III substance. US federal law restricts the drug to usage by, or on the order of, a licensed veterinarian.
