= Ernest H. Volwiler =

American pharmaceutical chemist (1893–1992)

Ernest Henry Volwiler
- Born: August 22, 1893; Hamilton, Ohio, United States
- Died: October 3, 1992 (aged 99); Lake Forest, Illinois, United States
- Education: Miami University, University of Illinois
- Known for: Nembutal, Pentothal
- Awards: IRI Medal (1955), Priestley Medal (1958), American Institute of Chemists Gold Medal (1960).
- Scientific career
- Fields: Synthetic organic chemistry
- Workplaces: Abbott Laboratories
- Doctoral advisor: Roger Adams

Ernest Henry Volwiler (August 22, 1893 – October 3, 1992) was an American chemist. He spent his career at Abbott Laboratories working his way from staff chemist to CEO. He was a pioneer in the field of anesthetic pharmacology, assisting in the development of two breakthrough drugs, Nembutal and Pentothal. Volwiler also helped Abbott Laboratories to achieve commercial success for its pharmaceutical products including the commercialization of penicillin and sulfa drugs during World War II.

== Early life and education ==
Ernest Henry Volwiler was born on August 22, 1893, to Mr. and Mrs. Jacob Volwiler of Hamilton, Ohio, German-speaking immigrants. They lived on a farm near the intersection of Layhigh and Robinson roads in Morgan Township, Butler County, Ohio. As a child, Volwiler and his brother Albert Tangeman Volwiler attended a one-room schoolhouse. Later, Ernest attended Morgan Twp. High School in Okeana, Ohio, graduating in 1909. He then spent a year teaching in a country school, to earn money for university.

Volwiler received a bachelor's degree from Miami University in Oxford, Ohio, in 1914. He became interested in chemistry after attending a lecture by John C. Hessler of James Milliken University, Decatur, Ill. He went on to receive a master's degree and Ph.D. in chemistry from the University of Illinois in 1916 and 1918. Volwiler was Roger Adams' first doctoral student. Starting in 1915 as a summer student, Volwiler worked with Clarence Derick's Organic Chemical Manufactures unit at the University of Illinois, learning to make and sell chemicals that had previously been imported from Germany. From 1916 to 1917 Volwiler served as Chemist-in-Charge of Organic Chemical Manufactures. From 1917 to 1918, he was a Fellow in Chemistry at the University of Illinois.

== Abbott Laboratories ==
Recruited by Wallace C. Abbott, Volwiler joined Abbott Laboratories as a research chemist in 1918. Volwiler became Chief Chemist in 1920 and Director of Research in 1930. From 1933 to 1946, he acted as Vice President of Research and Development. From 1946 to 1950, he became Executive Vice President of Abbott Laboratories, and from 1950 to 1958, President and General Manager. In 1958, he became Chairman of the Board, retiring in 1961. Abbott Laboratories produced significant financial returns during his tenure as CEO.

=== Barbital ===
His first job at Abbott Laboratories was to recreate the German sedative Veronal, for use in World War I hospitals. Volwiler was able to meet the demand, successfully synthesizing Barbital and overseeing its production in spite of shortages of time, people and equipment.

=== Nembutal ===
Volwiler was a pioneer in the field of anesthetic pharmacology, assisting in the development of two breakthrough drugs, the barbiturates Nembutal and Pentothal.

Nembutal, developed by Ernest H. Volwiler and Donalee L. Tabern of Abbott Laboratories in 1930, was a novel barbiturate that could induce sleep within 20 minutes. It had the advantage of rarely producing hangovers or other side effects. An oral-hypnotic barbiturate, Nembutal has a long narcotic duration, with attendant risk of abuse.

=== Pentothal ===
In 1934, Volwiler and Tabern synthesized the first intravenous general anesthetic, Sodium thiopental, in 1934. In the mid 1930s, Volwiler and Tabern spent three years screening over 200 candidate compounds in search of a substance which could be injected directly into the blood stream to produce unconsciousness. They eventually discovered that 5-ethyl-5-(1-methylbutyl)-2-thiobarbituric acid, a sulfur-bearing analogue of Nembutal, was fast, effective and lacked side effects such as twitching or delirium. Sodium thiopental was first used in humans on 8 March 1934 by Ralph M. Waters in an investigation of its properties, which were short-term anesthesia and surprisingly little analgesia. Three months later, John Silas Lundy started clinical trials of thiopental at the Mayo Clinic at the request of Abbott Laboratories. Volwiler and Tabern were awarded U.S. Patent No. 2,153,729 in 1939 for the discovery of thiopental.

Pentothal's discovery revolutionized intravenous anesthesia. The anesthetic can quickly put patients to sleep for a short period of time to relieve the discomfort of surgery or other medical procedures, or to allow physicians to administer longer lasting, inhalable anesthetics. It is both easy to use, and relatively safe to handle and transport. The dangers of cardio-depressant effects and overdose due to repeated use were soon discovered. During World War II, 78% of patients received Pentothal anesthetic, with a mortality rate of 0.018%.

Pentothal has sometimes been referred to as a "truth serum", because it can cause people to talk freely. For a time after World War II, pentothal was valued in some forms of psychotherapy for this disinhibiting effect. There is no guarantee, however, that what is reported is reliable, and such results have been rejected as evidence in court.

=== Sulfa drugs and penicillin ===
Volwiler helped Abbott Laboratories to achieve commercial success for its pharmaceutical products including the commercialization of sulfa drugs and penicillin during World War II. Abbott was one of five companies enlisted in 1941 by the U. S. government to develop penicillin.

=== Wartime intelligence ===
At the end of World War II, Volwiler was asked to visit German chemistry facilities on an intelligence mission to assess the types and extent of Germans chemical technology. Following just days after the Allied troops, he viewed bombed industrial facilities and talked to German scientists. Volwiler did not find the scientists difficult to speak with, remembering "Oh, they were scared to death and they were very cooperative." The visit yielded important information, previously unknown, about the types of chemicals being used in German chemical warfare.

They mentioned agricultural chemicals, and out of that came the statement that their work in agricultural chemicals included phosphorus compounds which were very toxic. Then the matter of war gases came up. […] We quickly dispatched a plane to Paris and another plane to London to the American headquarters there who sent the information to the United States. That was the first information that we had in this country of what the German war gas compounds were.

=== Later career ===
In the 1940s and 1950s, Volwiler led the company as it expanded into areas such as radiopharmaceuticals., the treatment of epilepsy, and the development of the non-caloric sweetener Sucaryl for use in diabetic diets. He retired in 1961.

From 1958 to 1964, Volwiler served a six-year term on the National Science Board, appointed by President Dwight D. Eisenhower. The NSB is the 24-member governing board of the National Science Foundation.

== Philanthropy ==
Volwiler was an active community leader and philanthropist serving, among others, on the boards of Lake Forest College and the Phi Kappa Tau Foundation. He served on the Board of Regents helping to establish the United States National Library of Medicine at the National Institutes of Health in Bethesda, Maryland, in 1959.

He made major philanthropic gifts to his alma maters, Miami University and the University of Illinois. In 1983, he donated $250,000 to Miami University to create a research professorship, the Ernest H. Volwiler Distinguished Research Professor in Chemistry, which has been awarded every three years beginning in 1984. In 1989, he contributed an additional $450,000 to endow a chair in the chemistry department.

He also established Ernest H. Volwiler Distinguished Scientist Lectureship and the Ernest H. Volwiler Chair in Natural Sciences and Mathematics at Lake Forest College, Lake Forest, Ill., where he had been a trustee.

Following Ernest Volwiler's death, the Ernest H. and Lillian H. Volwiler Fund was created at the Chicago Community Trust to be used in support of education.

== Awards and honors ==
Volwiler received honorary degrees from Northwestern University, Philadelphia College of Pharmacy and Science, St. Louis College of Pharmacy, Southwestern at Memphis, Coe College, Knox College and Lake Forest College. Other honors include the Chemical Industry Medal in 1954, IRI Medal from the Industrial Research Institute in 1955, the American Chemical Society's Priestley Medal in 1958, and the American Institute of Chemists Gold Medal in 1960. Volwiler and Tabern were inducted into the National Inventors Hall of Fame in 1986 for their work on Pentothal.

The American Association of Colleges of Pharmacy gives the Volwiler Research Achievement Award in Volwiler's memory. Abbott established the Volwiler Society in his honor in 1985 to recognize the company's most distinguished scientists and engineers.

== Family ==
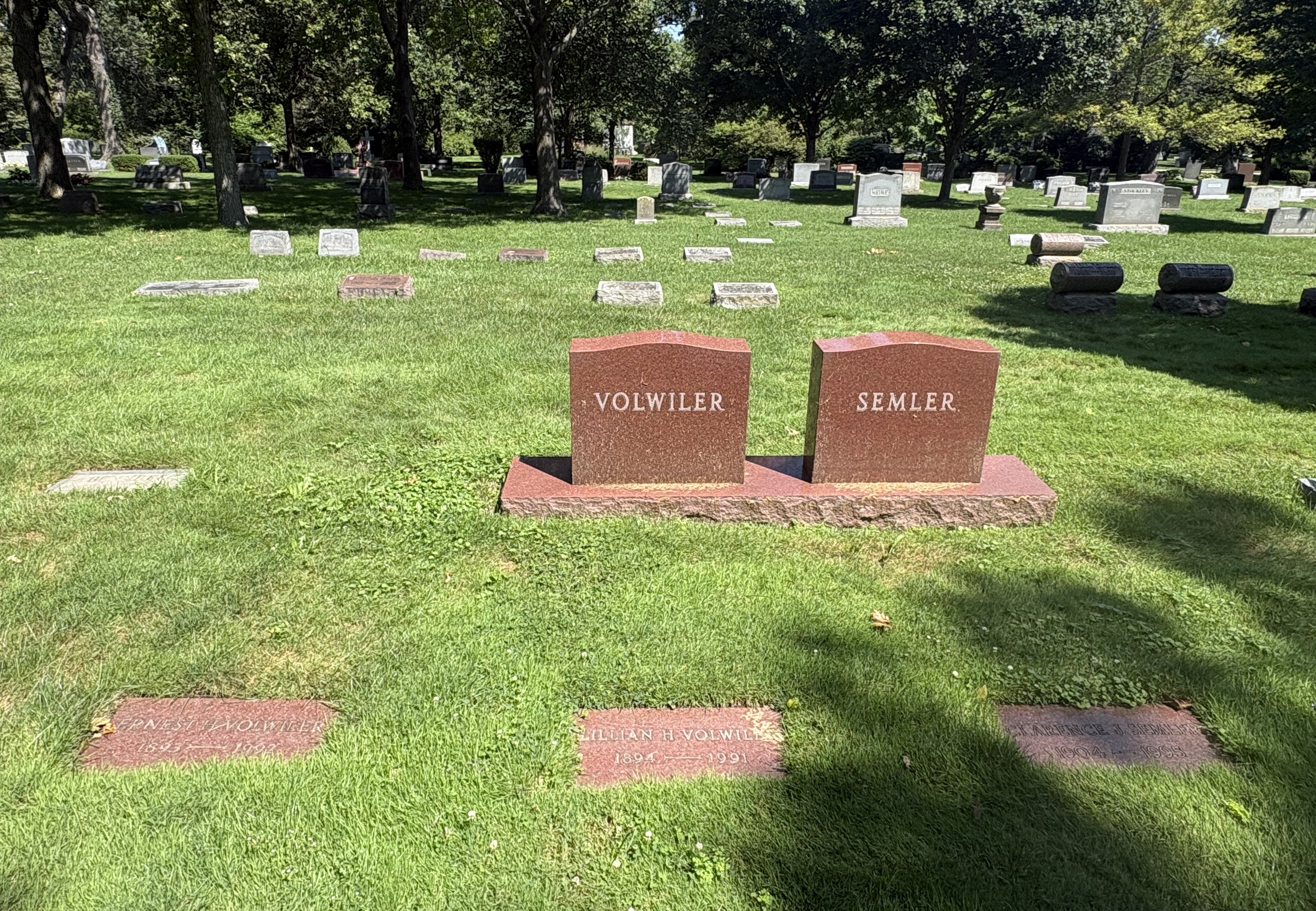
Volwiler's grave (front left) at Lake Forest Cemetery

Volwiler's brother was the noted Ohio University historian, Albert T. Volwiler. Ernest Volwiler married Lillian F. Huggler (1894-1991) in 1920, they remained married for 71 years. The couple were survived by two daughters and a son, nine grandchildren, 13 great-grandchildren and two great-great-grandchildren.

Ernest H. Volwiler died in Lake Forest, Illinois on October 3, 1992, and was buried at Lake Forest Cemetery.
