= ATCvet code QN51 =

Veterinary medical products classification subgroup

ATCvet code QN51 Products for animal euthanasia is a therapeutic subgroup of the Anatomical Therapeutic Chemical Classification System for veterinary medicinal products, a system of alphanumeric codes developed by the World Health Organization (WHO) for the classification of drugs and other medical products for veterinary use. Subgroup QN51 is part of the anatomical group QN Nervous system.

National versions of the ATC classification may include additional codes not present in this list, which follows the WHO version.

== QN51A Products for animal euthanasia ==
=== QN51AA Barbiturates ===
QN51AA01 Pentobarbital
QN51AA02 Secobarbital
QN51AA30 Combinations of barbiturates
QN51AA51 Pentobarbital, combinations
QN51AA52 Secobarbital, combinations

=== QN51AX Other products for animal euthanasia ===
QN51AA50 Combinations
