= Sodium thiopental =

Barbiturate general anesthetic

- Skeletal structure of sodium thiopental

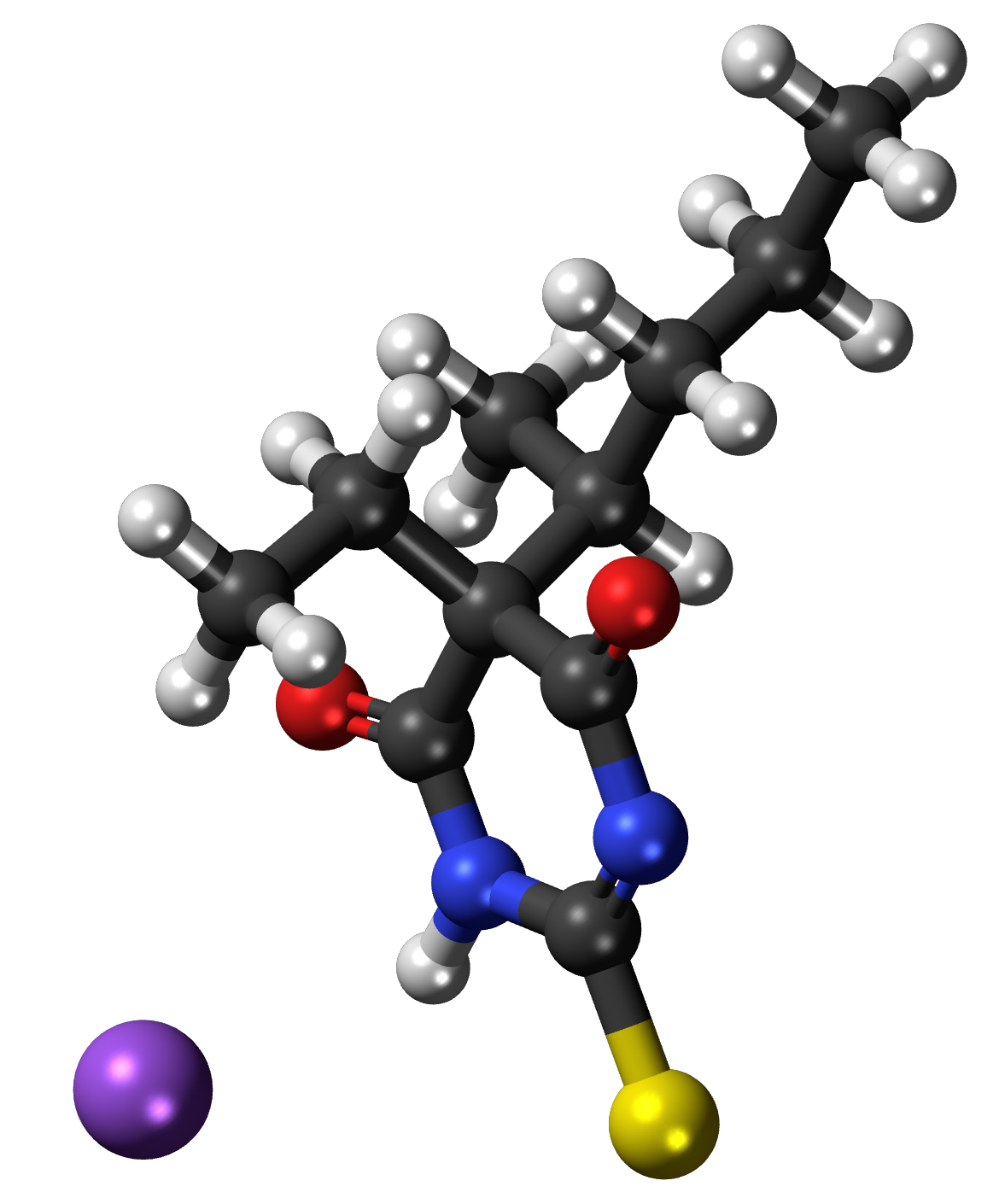
- 3D representation of a sodium thiopental molecule

Clinical data
- Trade names: Pentothal, others
- Other names: Truth serum, thiopentone, thiopental
- AHFS/Drugs.com: Monograph
- Pregnancy category: AU: D
- Routes of administration: Intravenous, by mouth, rectal
- Drug class: Barbiturate
- ATC code: N01AF03 (WHO) N05CA19 (WHO)

Legal status
- Legal status: AU: S4 (Prescription only); BR: Class B1 (Psychoactive drugs); CA: Schedule IV; UK: Class B; US: Schedule III

Pharmacokinetic data
- Protein binding: 80%
- Metabolism: Liver
- Metabolites: Pentobarbital, others
- Onset of action: 30–45 seconds
- Elimination half-life: 5.5–26 hours
- Duration of action: 5–10 minutes

Identifiers
- IUPAC name: sodium 5-ethyl-5-pentan-2-yl-2-sulfanylidene-1,3-diazinane-4,6-dione
- CAS Number: 71-73-8; 76-75-5
- PubChem CID: 3000714
- DrugBank: DB00599
- ChemSpider: 2272257
- UNII: 49Y44QZL70
- KEGG: D00714
- ChEBI: CHEBI:9561
- ChEMBL: ChEMBL738
- CompTox Dashboard (EPA): DTXSID1021744
- ECHA InfoCard: 100.000.694

Chemical and physical data
- Formula: C_{11}H_{17}N_{2}NaO_{2}S
- Molar mass: 264.32 g·mol^{−1}
- 3D model (JSmol): Interactive image
- Chirality: Racemic mixture
- SMILES: [Na+].O=C1NC(=S)/N=C(/[O-])C1(C(C)CCC)CC
- InChI: InChI=1S/C11H18N2O2S.Na/c1-4-6-7(3)11(5-2)8(14)12-10(16)13-9(11)15;/h7H,4-6H2,1-3H3,(H2,12,13,14,15,16);/q;+1/p-1; Key:AWLILQARPMWUHA-UHFFFAOYSA-M

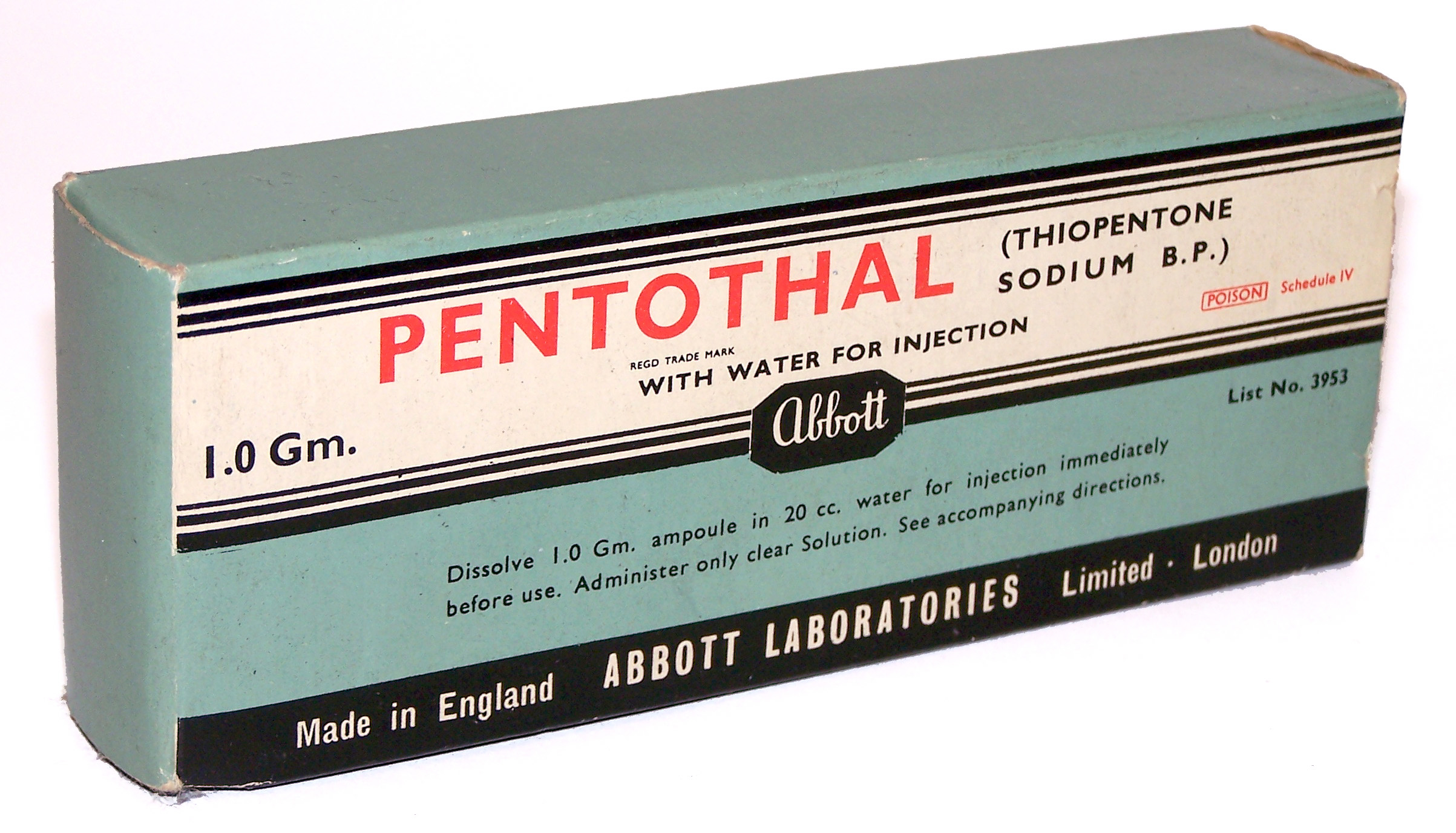
Pentothal vintage package

Sodium thiopental, also known as thiopental sodium or thiopentone and sold under the brand name Pentothal, is a rapid-onset short-acting barbiturate general anesthetic. It is the thiobarbiturate analog of pentobarbital, and an analog of thiobarbital. Sodium thiopental is a therapeutic alternative on the World Health Organization's List of Essential Medicines. It was the first of three drugs administered during most lethal injections in the United States until the US division of Hospira objected and stopped manufacturing the drug for this purpose in 2011, and the European Union additionally banned the export of the drug for this purpose. Although thiopental abuse carries a dependency risk, its recreational use is rare.

Sodium thiopental is well-known in popular culture, especially under the name "sodium pentothal," as a "truth serum," although its efficacy in this role is questioned.

== Uses ==
=== Anesthesia ===
Sodium thiopental is an ultra-short-acting barbiturate and has been used commonly in the induction phase of general anesthesia. Its use has been largely replaced with that of propofol, but may retain some popularity as an induction agent for rapid-sequence induction and intubation, such as in obstetrics. Following intravenous injection, the drug rapidly reaches the brain and causes unconsciousness within 30–45 seconds. At one minute, the drug attains a peak concentration of about 60% of the total dose in the brain. Thereafter, the drug distributes to the rest of the body, and in about 5–10 minutes the concentration in the brain is low enough that consciousness returns.

A normal dose of sodium thiopental given to a pregnant person for operative delivery (caesarean section) rapidly makes them unconscious, but the baby in their uterus remains conscious. However, larger or repeated doses can depress the baby's consciousness.

Sodium thiopental is not used to maintain anesthesia in surgical procedures because, in infusion, it displays zero-order elimination pharmacokinetics, leading to a long period before consciousness is regained. Instead, anesthesia is usually maintained with an inhaled anesthetic (gas) agent. Inhaled anesthetics are eliminated relatively quickly, so stopping the inhaled anesthetic allows rapid return of consciousness. Sodium thiopental would have to be given in large amounts to maintain unconsciousness during anaesthesia due to its rapid redistribution throughout the body (as it has a high volume of distribution). Since its half-life of 5.5 to 26 hours is quite long, consciousness would take a long time to return.

In veterinary medicine, sodium thiopental is used to induce anesthesia in animals. Since it is redistributed to fat, certain lean breeds of dogs such as sighthounds have prolonged recoveries from sodium thiopental due to their lack of body fat. Conversely, obese animals recover rapidly, but it takes much longer for the drug to be entirely removed (metabolized) from their bodies. Sodium thiopental is always administered intravenously, as it can be fairly irritating to tissue and is a vesicant; severe tissue necrosis and sloughing can occur if it is injected incorrectly into the tissue around a vein.

=== Medically-induced coma ===
In addition to anesthesia induction, sodium thiopental was historically used to induce medical comas. It has now been superseded by drugs such as propofol because their effects wear off more quickly than thiopental. Patients with brain swelling, causing elevation of intracranial pressure, either secondary to trauma or following surgery, may benefit from this drug. Sodium thiopental, and the barbiturate class of drugs, decrease neuronal activity thereby decreasing cerebral metabolic rate of oxygen consumption (CMRO_{2}), thus decreasing the cerebrovascular response to carbon dioxide, which in turn decreases intracranial pressure. Patients with refractory elevated intracranial pressure (RICH) due to traumatic brain injury (TBI) may have improved long term outcome when barbiturate coma is added to their neurointensive care treatment. Reportedly, thiopental has been shown to be superior to pentobarbital in reducing intracranial pressure. This phenomenon is also called an inverse steal or Robin Hood effect as cerebral perfusion to all parts of the brain is reduced (due to the decreased cerebrovascular response to carbon dioxide) allowing optimal perfusion to ischaemic areas of the brain which have higher metabolic demands, since vessels supplying ischaemic areas of the brain would already be maximally dilated because of the metabolic demand.

=== Euthanasia ===
Sodium thiopental is used intravenously for the purposes of euthanasia. In both Belgium and the Netherlands, where active euthanasia is allowed by law, the standard protocol recommends sodium thiopental as the ideal agent to induce coma, followed by pancuronium bromide to paralyze muscles and stop breathing.

Intravenous administration is the most reliable and rapid way to accomplish euthanasia. Death is quick. A coma is first induced by intravenous administration of thiopental sodium (Nesdonal) in a small volume (10 mL physiological saline). Then, a triple dose of a non-depolarizing neuromuscular blocking drug is given, such as pancuronium bromide (Pavulon) or vecuronium bromide (Norcuron). The paralytic should be given intravenously to ensure optimal bioavailability but pancuronium bromide may be administered intramuscularly at an increased dosage level.

=== Lethal injection ===
Along with pancuronium bromide and potassium chloride, thiopental is used in 34 US states to execute prisoners by lethal injection. A large dose is given to ensure rapid loss of consciousness. Although death usually occurs within ten minutes of the beginning of the injection process, some have been known to take longer.

In December 2009, Ohio became the first state in the US to use a single dose of sodium thiopental for an execution, following the failed use of the standard three-drug cocktail during a prior execution, due to inability to locate suitable veins. Kenneth Biros was executed using the single-drug method.

Washington became the second state in the US to use the single-dose sodium thiopental injections for executions. In September 2010, the execution of Cal Coburn Brown was the first in the state to use a single-dose, single-drug injection. His death was pronounced approximately one and a half minutes after the intravenous administration of five grams of the drug.

After its use for the execution of Jeffrey Landrigan in the US, the United Kingdom introduced a ban on the export of sodium thiopental in December 2010, after it was established that no European supplies to the US were being used for any other purpose. The restrictions were based on "the European Union Torture Regulation (including licensing of drugs used in execution by lethal injection)". From 21 December 2011, the EU extended trade restrictions to prevent the export of certain medicinal products for capital punishment, stating that "the Union disapproves of capital punishment in all circumstances and works towards its universal abolition".

=== Truth serum ===
Thiopental is still used in some places as a truth serum to weaken the resolve of a subject and make the individual more compliant to pressure. Barbiturates decrease both higher cortical brain function and inhibition. It is thought that because lying is a more involved process than telling the truth, suppression of the higher cortical functions may lead to the uncovering of the truth. The drug tends to make subjects verbose and cooperative with interrogators; however, the reliability of confessions made under thiopental is questionable.

=== Psychiatry ===
Psychiatrists have used thiopental to desensitize patients with phobias and to "facilitate the recall of painful repressed memories." One psychiatrist who worked with thiopental is Jan Bastiaans, who used this procedure to help relieve trauma in surviving victims of the Holocaust. Another notable psychiatrist using thiopental for the first time in the 1960s in psychoanalytic therapy setting - in a somewhat similar way to psycholytic psychotherapy - was the Hungarian-Australian psychiatrist Imre Zádor. He administered thiopental to psychotherapy patients to reduce transferential resistance in cases of anorexia nervosa as well as to resolve unconscious blockages in other cases.

== Mechanism of action ==
Sodium thiopental is a member of the barbiturate class of drugs, which are relatively non-selective compounds that bind to an entire superfamily of ligand-gated ion channels, of which the GABA_{A} receptor channel is one of several representatives. This superfamily of ion channels includes the neuronal nicotinic acetylcholine receptor (nAChR), the 5-HT3 receptor, the glycine receptor and others. Surprisingly, while GABA_{A} receptor currents are increased by barbiturates (and other general anesthetics), ligand-gated ion channels that are predominantly permeable for cationic ions are blocked by these compounds. For example, neuronal nAChR are blocked by clinically relevant anesthetic concentrations of both sodium thiopental and pentobarbital. Such findings implicate (non-GABAergic) ligand-gated ion channels, e.g. the neuronal nAChR, in mediating some of the (side) effects of barbiturates. The GABA_{A} receptor is an inhibitory channel that decreases neuronal activity, and barbiturates enhance the inhibitory action of the GABA_{A} receptor.

== Controversies ==
Following a shortage that led a court to delay an execution in California, a company spokesman for Hospira, the sole American manufacturer of the drug, objected to the use of thiopental in lethal injection. "Hospira manufactures this product because it improves or saves lives, and the company markets it solely for use as indicated on the product labeling. The drug is not indicated for capital punishment and Hospira does not support its use in this procedure." On January 21, 2011, the company announced that it would stop production of sodium thiopental from its plant in Italy, because it could not provide Italian authorities with guarantees that exported doses would not be used in executions. According to a company spokesperson, Italy was the only viable place where it could produce the drug, leaving the US without a supplier.

In October 2015 the US Food and Drug Administration (FDA) confiscated an overseas shipment of thiopental destined for the states of Arizona and Texas. The FDA said in a statement, "Courts have concluded that sodium thiopental for the injection in humans is an unapproved drug and may not be imported into the country".

== Metabolism ==
Thiopental rapidly and easily crosses the blood–brain barrier as it is a lipophilic molecule. As with all lipid-soluble anaesthetic drugs, the short duration of action of sodium thiopental is due almost entirely to its redistribution away from central circulation into muscle and fatty tissue, due to its very high lipid–water partition coefficient (approximately 10), leading to sequestration in fatty tissue. Once redistributed, the free fraction in the blood is metabolized in the liver by zero-order kinetics. Sodium thiopental is mainly metabolized to pentobarbital, 5-ethyl-5-(1'-methyl-3'-hydroxybutyl)-2-thiobarbituric acid, and 5-ethyl-5-(1'-methyl-3'-carboxypropyl)-2-thiobarbituric acid.

== Dosage ==
There are many factors that can alter the usual dose range for induction of anesthesia. Premedication with sedatives such as benzodiazepines or clonidine will reduce requirements due to drug synergy, as do specific disease states and other patient factors. Among patient factors are: age, sex, and lean body mass. Specific disease conditions that can alter the dose requirements of thiopentone and for that matter any other intravenous anaesthetic are: hypovolemia, burns, azotemia, liver failure, hypoproteinemia, etc.

== Contraindications ==
Thiopental should be used with caution in cases of liver disease, Addison's disease, myxedema, severe heart disease, severe hypotension, a severe breathing disorder, or a family history of porphyria.

Co-administration of pentoxifylline and thiopental causes death by acute pulmonary edema in rats. This pulmonary edema was not mediated by cardiac failure or by pulmonary hypertension but was due to increased pulmonary vascular permeability.

== History ==
Sodium thiopental was discovered in the early 1930s by Ernest H. Volwiler and Donalee L. Tabern, working for Abbott Laboratories. It was first used in human beings on March 8, 1934, by Dr. Ralph M. Waters in an investigation of its properties, which were short-term anesthesia and surprisingly little analgesia. Three months later, Dr. John S. Lundy started a clinical trial of thiopental at the Mayo Clinic at the request of Abbott. Abbott continued to make the drug until 2004, when it spun off its hospital-products division as Hospira.

Thiopental is famously associated with a number of anesthetic deaths in victims of the attack on Pearl Harbor. These deaths, relatively soon after the drug's introduction, were said to be due to excessive doses given to shocked trauma patients. However, evidence available through the freedom of information legislation suggested that the story was exaggerated. Of the 344 wounded that were admitted to the Tripler Army Hospital, only 13 did not survive, and it is unlikely that thiopentone overdose was responsible for more than a few of them.
