= Jay Chapman (physician) =

American physician and forensic pathologist

Anthony Jay Chapman, known as A. Jay Chapman, (born Jan 1939) is an American physician and forensic pathologist who, in 1977, created the first three-drug protocol used for lethal injection, the most commonly used form of capital punishment in the United States. While Chapman was chief medical examiner for the State of Oklahoma, he was asked by legislator William Wiseman to develop the method. In recent years, Chapman has cast doubt on the lethal injection procedure in the United States, specifically with regards to the lack of training required for those administering the drugs and the botched executions that have occurred.
