= Intracardiac injection =

Method of drug administration to the heart

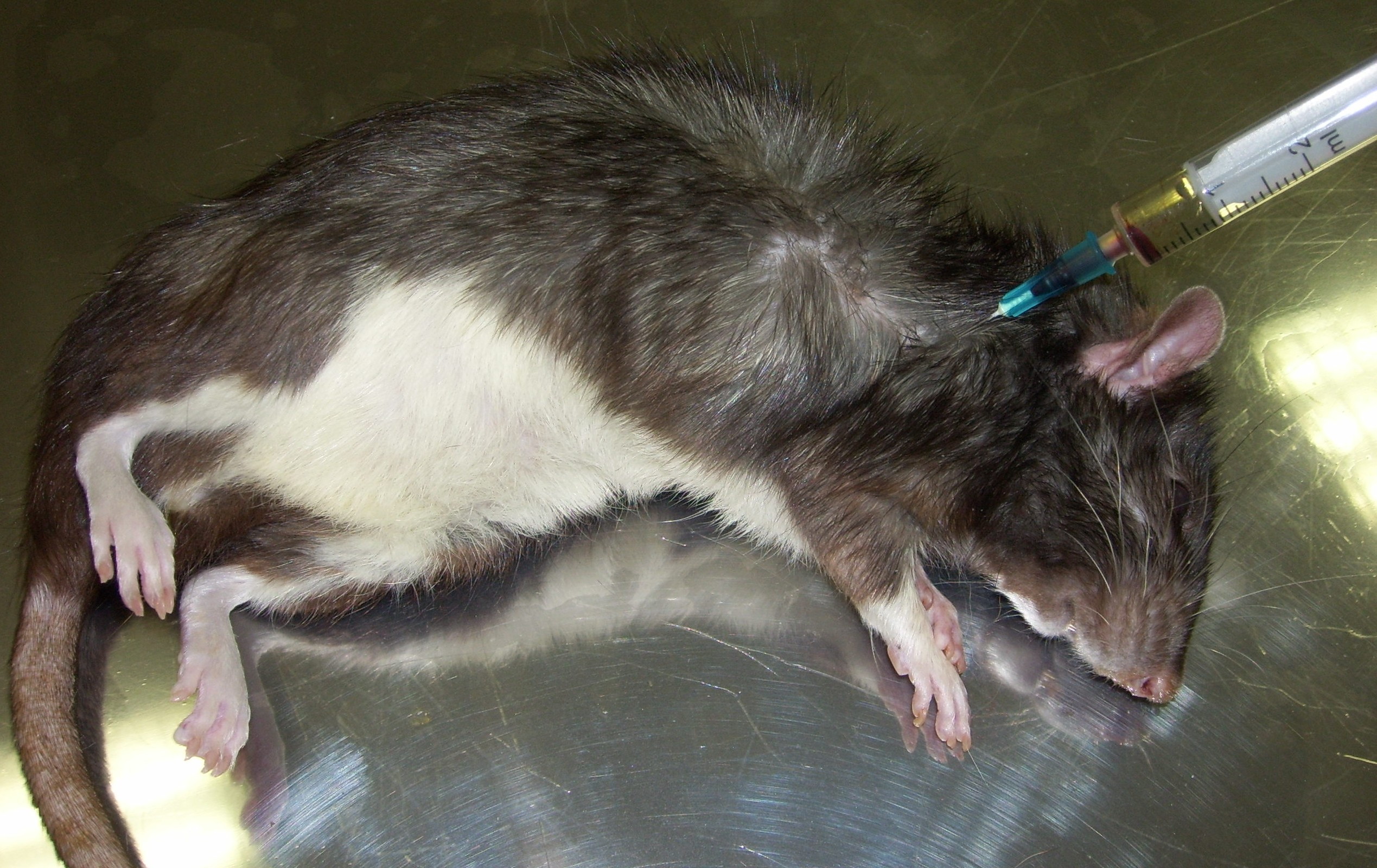
An anesthetized rat being euthanized by intracardiac injection

Intracardiac injections are injections that are given directly into the heart muscles or ventricles. They can be used in emergencies, although they are rarely used in modern practice.

== History ==
The practice of intracardiac injection originated in the 1800s. It was commonly performed during the 1960s, as it was considered the fastest way to get medication to the heart. The practice began declining during the 1970s as more reliable delivery methods (i.e., intravenous, endotracheal, and intraosseous) came into use. Around that time, studies revealed that intravenous injections were equally effective and were less prone to risks and complications.

== Procedure ==
Intracardiac injections of drugs were generally used only to provide emergency drugs to a patient if other approaches would be ineffective; for example if drugs could not be administered intravenously due to individual circumstances. The procedure is performed by inserting a long spinal needle into the ventricular chamber. The needle is inserted in the fourth intercostal space between the ribs. Today it is considered obsolete, and other routes to give drugs are preferred (such as intraosseously).

== Complications ==
The two primary complications are injury to the coronary artery and hemorrhage within the pericardium. In a pericardial hemorrhage, the external sac covering the heart – called the pericardium – fills with blood. This causes external pressure on the heart, which prevents it from pumping properly. The probability of complications can be reduced by using a narrow gauge of needle.

Use of intracardiac injections requires the cessation of cardiopulmonary resuscitation and may be more time-consuming than other delivery methods.

== Society and culture ==
In the movie Pulp Fiction, an intracardiac injection of epinephrine is used to treat a heroin overdose (far from the normal medical treatment for this condition, which would be an intravenous or intramuscular injection of naloxone).

In the movie The Rock, a character self-administers intracardiac atropine to counter the effects of VX nerve gas after exposure.

In the TV show Fringe, Season 3, Episode 8, "Entrada", Elizabeth is administered intracardiac adrenaline from agent Boyles to counter the effects of chemically-induced whole-body paralysis.
