= Thiobarbital =

Chemical compound

Identifiers
- IUPAC name: 5,5-diethyl-2-thioxodihydropyrimidine-4,6(1H,5H)-dione
- CAS Number: 77-32-7
- PubChem CID: 667509
- ChemSpider: 580885
- UNII: H4FNF051KS
- CompTox Dashboard (EPA): DTXSID40227810
- ECHA InfoCard: 100.000.929

Chemical and physical data
- Formula: C_{8}H_{12}N_{2}O_{2}S
- Molar mass: 200.26 g·mol^{−1}
- 3D model (JSmol): Interactive image
- SMILES: O=C1NC(=S)NC(=O)C1(CC)CC
- InChI: InChI=1S/C8H12N2O2S/c1-3-8(4-2)5(11)9-7(13)10-6(8)12/h3-4H2,1-2H3,(H2,9,10,11,12,13); Key:QGVNJRROSLYGKF-UHFFFAOYSA-N

Thiobarbital is a drug which is a barbiturate derivative. It is the thiobarbiturate analogue of barbital.

== Synthesis ==
Thiobarbital synthesis:

It is of note that although the drug can be prepared by the above route (cf e.g. thialbarbital), reaction of barbital with phosphorus pentasulfide constitutes an alternative route to thiobarbital.
