= Pentobarbital =

Short-acting barbiturate

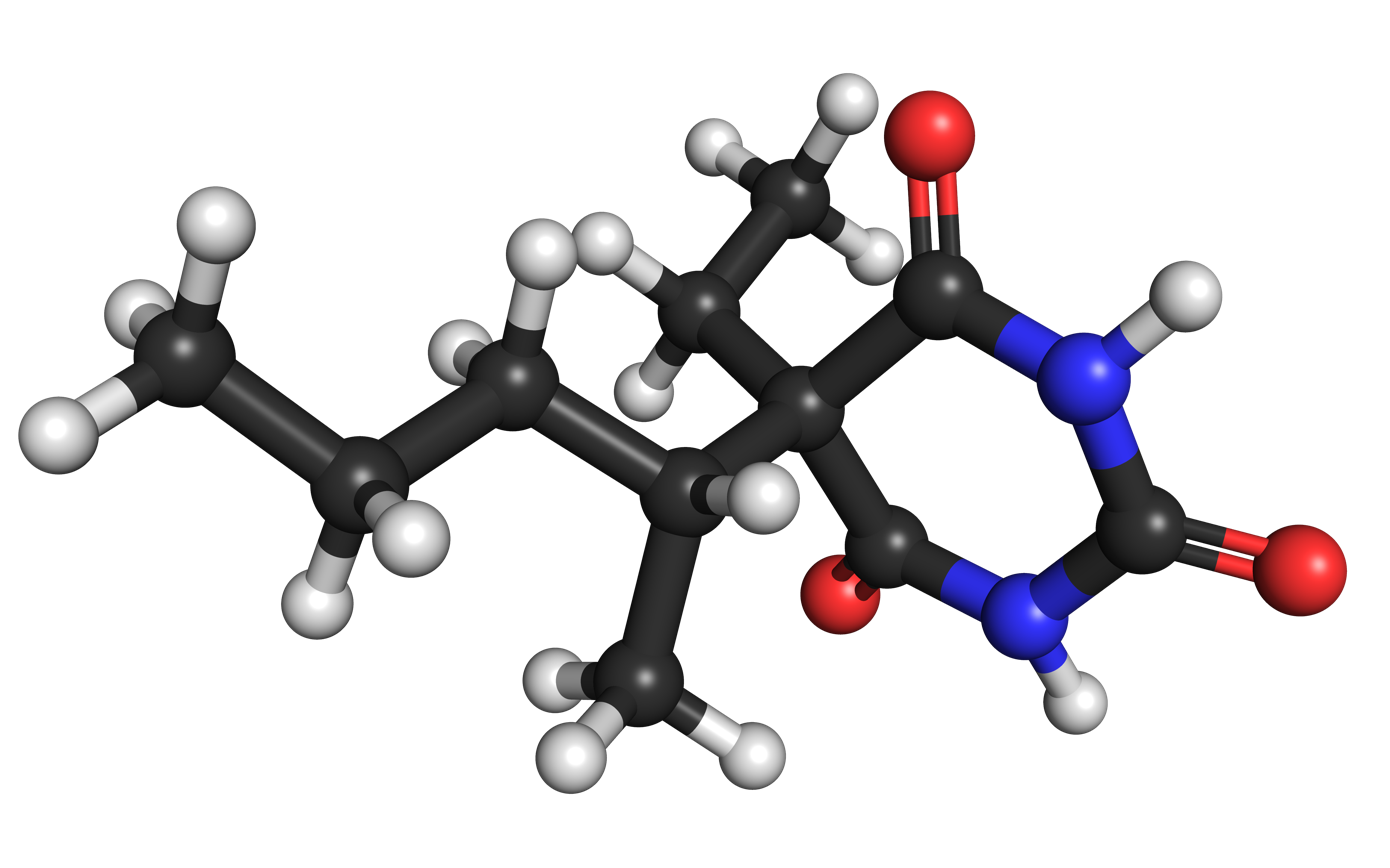
- Above: molecular structure of pentobarbitone (keto form) Below: 3D representation of pentobarbitone (keto form) molecule

Clinical data
- Trade names: Nembutal
- Other names: Pentobarbitone
- AHFS/Drugs.com: Monograph
- MedlinePlus: a682416
- License data: US DailyMed: Pentobarbital
- Pregnancy category: AU: C
- Routes of administration: By mouth, intravenous, intramuscular, rectal
- Drug class: Barbiturate
- ATC code: N05CA01 (WHO) QN51AA01 (WHO)

Legal status
- Legal status: AU: S8 (Controlled drug) / S4 for IV preparations; BR: Class B1 (Psychoactive drugs); CA: Schedule IV; DE: Anlage III (Special prescription form required); UK: Class B; US: Schedule II; UN: Psychotropic Schedule III; In general: ℞ (Prescription only)

Pharmacokinetic data
- Bioavailability: 70–90% (oral); 90% (rectal)
- Protein binding: 20–45%
- Metabolism: Liver
- Elimination half-life: 15–48 hours
- Excretion: Kidney

Identifiers
- IUPAC name: 5-Ethyl-5-(1-methylbutyl)-2,4,6(1H,3H,5H)-pyrimidinetrione
- CAS Number: 76-74-4
- PubChem CID: 4737
- IUPHAR/BPS: 5480
- DrugBank: DB00312
- ChemSpider: 4575
- UNII: I4744080IR
- KEGG: D00499
- ChEBI: CHEBI:7983
- ChEMBL: ChEMBL448
- CompTox Dashboard (EPA): DTXSID7023435
- ECHA InfoCard: 100.000.895

Chemical and physical data
- Formula: C_{11}H_{18}N_{2}O_{3}
- Molar mass: 226.276 g·mol^{−1}
- 3D model (JSmol): Interactive image
- SMILES: O=C1NC(=O)NC(=O)C1(C(C)CCC)CC
- InChI: InChI=1S/C11H18N2O3/c1-4-6-7(3)11(5-2)8(14)12-10(16)13-9(11)15/h7H,4-6H2,1-3H3,(H2,12,13,14,15,16); Key:WEXRUCMBJFQVBZ-UHFFFAOYSA-N

Pentobarbital is a short-acting barbiturate typically used as a sedative, a preanesthetic, and to control convulsions in emergencies. It can also be used for short-term treatment of insomnia but has been largely replaced by the benzodiazepine family of drugs.

In high doses, pentobarbital causes death by respiratory arrest. It is frequently used for veterinary euthanasia, and is used by some US states and the United States federal government for executions by lethal injection. In some countries and states, it is also used for physician-assisted suicide.

Pentobarbital was developed by Ernest H. Volwiler and Donalee L. Tabern at Abbott Laboratories in 1930. The drug was widely abused beginning in the late 1930s, and it is sometimes known as "yellow jackets" due to the yellow color of Nembutal-branded capsules.

== Uses ==
=== Medical ===
Typical applications for pentobarbital include use as a sedative, a short-term hypnotic, or a preanesthetic as well as for treatment of insomnia and control of convulsions in emergencies. Abbott Pharmaceutical discontinued manufacture of their Nembutal brand of pentobarbital capsules in 1999, largely replaced by the benzodiazepine family of drugs.

Pentobarbital can reduce intracranial pressure in Reye syndrome, treat traumatic brain injury and induce coma in cerebral ischemia patients. Pentobarbital-induced coma has been advocated in patients with acute liver failure that is refractory to mannitol.

Pentobarbital is also used as a veterinary anesthetic agent and euthanasia drug.

=== Euthanasia and assisted suicide ===
Pentobarbital can cause death when used in high doses. It is used for euthanasia for humans as well as animals. It is taken alone, or in combination with complementary agents such as phenytoin, in commercial animal euthanasia injectable solutions. As of 2021, the sodium salt of pentobarbital was considered the "drug of choice" for animal euthanasia in the United States and Canada.

Pentobarbital sodium (CAS No. 57–33–0)

In the Netherlands, pentobarbital is part of the standard protocol for physician-assisted suicide for self-administration by the patient. It is given in liquid form, in a solution of sugar syrup and alcohol, preceded by an antiemetic to prevent vomiting. It is taken by mouth for physician-assisted death in the United States states of Oregon, Washington, Vermont, and California (as of January 2016). In Switzerland, sodium pentobarbital is administered to the patient intravenously. Once administered, sleep is induced within 30 seconds, and the heart stops beating within 3 minutes. Oral administration is also used. A Swiss pharmacist reported in 2022 that the dose for assisted suicide had been raised because with lower doses death was preceded by a coma of up to 10 hours in some cases.

=== Execution ===
Pentobarbital has been used or considered as a substitute for the barbiturate sodium thiopental used for capital punishment by lethal injection in the United States when that drug became unavailable. In 2011 the U.S. manufacturer of sodium thiopental stopped production, and importation of the drug proved impossible. Pentobarbital was used in a U.S. execution for the first time in December 2010 in Oklahoma, as part of a three-drug protocol. In March 2011 pentobarbital was used for the first time as the sole drug in a U.S. execution, in Ohio. Since then several states as well as the federal government have used pentobarbital for lethal injections; some use three-drug protocols and others use pentobarbital alone.

Texas began using the single-drug pentobarbital protocol for executing death-row inmates on 18 July 2012, because of a shortage of pancuronium bromide, a muscle paralytic previously used as one component of a three-drug cocktail. In October 2013, Missouri changed its protocol to allow for pentobarbital from a compounding pharmacy to be used in a lethal dose for executions. It was first used in November 2013.

According to a December 2020 ProPublica article, by 2017 the federal Bureau of Prisons (BOP), in discussion with then Attorney General Jeff Sessions, had begun to search for suppliers of pentobarbital to be used in lethal injections. The BOP was aware that the use of pentobarbital as their "new drug choice" would be challenged in the courts because some lawyers had said that "pentobarbital would flood prisoners' lungs with froth and foam, inflicting pain and terror akin to a death by drowning." BOP claimed that these concerns were unjustified and that their two expert witnesses asserted that the use of pentobarbital was "humane". On 25 July 2019, US Attorney General William Barr directed the federal government to resume capital punishment after 16 years, despite shortages of the compound caused by European Union restrictions and a lack of U.S. manufacturers. The federal protocol provides for intravenous administration of two syringes containing equal amounts of pentobarbital sodium followed by a saline flush.

On 30 September 2026, pentobarbital was used by the State of Tennessee in the botched execution of Christa Pike, who regained consciousness days after receiving the lethal injection.

== Pharmacology ==
=== Pharmacodynamics ===
Like other barbiturates, pentobarbital binds to the barbiturate-binding site on the GABA_{A} receptor. This action increases the duration of ion-channel opening. At high doses, pentobarbital is capable of opening the ion channel in the absence of GABA.

=== Pharmacokinetics ===
Pentobarbital undergoes first-pass metabolism in the liver and possibly the intestines.

== Drug interactions ==
Administration of ethanol, benzodiazepines, opioids, antihistamines, other sedative–hypnotics, and other central nervous system depressants will cause possible additive effects.

== Chemistry ==
Pentobarbital is synthesized by methods analogous to that of amobarbital, the only difference being that the alkylation of α-ethylmalonic ester is carried out with 2-bromopentane in place of 1-bromo-3-methylbutane to give pentobarbital.

Pentobarbital can occur as a free acid but is usually formulated as the sodium salt, pentobarbital sodium. The free acid is only slightly soluble in water and in ethanol while the sodium salt shows better solubility.

== Society and culture ==
Pentobarbital is the INN, AAN, BAN, and USAN, while pentobarbitone is a former AAN and BAN.

Nembutal capsule

One brand name for this drug is Nembutal, coined by John S. Lundy, who started using it in 1930, from the structural formula of the sodium salt—Na (sodium) + ethyl + methyl + butyl + al (common suffix for barbiturates). Nembutal is trademarked and manufactured by the Danish pharmaceutical company Lundbeck (now produced by Akorn Pharmaceuticals), which is the only injectable form of pentobarbital approved for sale in the United States. However, European Union restrictions on the export of drugs used to impose the death penalty constrained the availability of the drug in the United States and Canada. Attempts by drug smugglers to transport pentobarbital from Mexico to the United States have been reported since 2018.

Ernest H. Volwiler and Donalee L. Tabern developed pentobarbital at Abbott Laboratories in 1930. Abbott discontinued its Nembutal brand of pentobarbital capsules in 1999, largely replaced by the benzodiazepine family of drugs. Abbott's Nembutal, known on the streets as "yellow jackets", was widely abused. They were available as 30, 50, and 100 mg capsules of yellow, white-orange, and yellow colors, respectively.

In the 2025 mystery film Wake Up Dead Man, lethal doses of pentobarbital are used as a slow-acting poison in the murder of two separate characters.

=== Lethal use ===
Pentobarbital has been publicized as a suicide method by assisted suicide advocacy groups, in particular Exit International. Around 2008, suicide tourists were traveling to Mexico in order to purchase pentobarbital from veterinary pharmacies, a means that is no longer possible owing to tighter controls. Around 2025, prosecutions for its illegal distribution to persons seeking to end their lives have occurred in Australia, France, and the United States.
