= List of botched executions =

A botched execution is defined by political science professor Austin Sarat as:

Botched executions occur when there is a breakdown in, or departure from, the 'protocol' for a particular method of execution. The protocol can be established by the norms, expectations, and advertised virtues of each method or by the government's officially adopted execution guidelines. Botched executions are 'those involving unanticipated problems or delays that caused, at least arguably, unnecessary agony for the prisoner or that reflect gross incompetence of the executioner.' Examples of such problems include, among other things, inmates catching fire while being electrocuted, being strangled during hangings (instead of having their necks broken), and being administered the wrong dosages of specific drugs for lethal injections.

== List ==
=== Before 1901 ===
Date	Name	Place of execution	Method of execution	Outcome	Description
28 July 1540	Thomas Cromwell	Tower Hill, London, England	Beheading by axe	Died	Edward Hall wrote that "So patiently suffered the stroke of the axe, by a ragged and Boocherly miser, which very ungoodly perfourmed the office."
27 May 1541	Margaret Pole, Countess of Salisbury	Tower Green, Tower of London, London, England	Beheading by axe	Died	An inexperienced executioner reportedly hacked at her a total of 11 times before finally decapitating her. Some sources claim that Margaret refused to lay her head on the block, declaiming, "So should traitors do, and I am none"; according to the account, she turned her head "every which way", reportedly instructing the executioner that, if he wanted her head, he should take it as he could, although this may be apocryphal.
8 February 1587	Mary, Queen of Scots	Great Hall, Fotheringhay Castle, Northamptonshire, England	Beheading by axe	Died	The execution took three blows.
14 December 1650	Anne Greene	Oxford Castle, Oxford, England	Hanging	Survived	She was found alive, in her coffin, a day after her hanging, having a faint pulse and weak breathing. Set free after failed execution.
21 July 1683	William Russell, Lord Russell	Lincoln's Inn Fields, London, England	Beheading by axe	Died	The executioner, Jack Ketch, later wrote a letter of apology for conducting the execution poorly. Although in the letter, Ketch blames Lord Russell himself for making the execution more difficult.
15 July 1685	James Scott, 1st Duke of Monmouth	Tower Hill, London, England	Beheading by axe	Died	Jack Ketch took between five and eight strokes to behead him.
24 December 1705	John Smith	Tyburn, London, England	Hanging	Survived	He survived after hanging for 15 minutes. Set free after failed execution.
2 September 1724	Margaret Dickson	Grassmarket, Edinburgh, Scotland	Hanging	Survived	Survived after hanging, was later found alive in her coffin. Set free after failed execution.
24 November 1740	William Duell	Tyburn, London, England	Hanging	Survived	Survived the execution after being left hanging by the neck for around 20 minutes. Sentence commuted to transportation.
18 August 1746	Arthur Elphinstone, 6th Lord Balmerino	Tower Hill, London, England	Beheading by axe	Died	It is said that it took three blows to behead him.
28 March 1757	Robert-François Damiens	Place de Grève, Paris, France	Dismemberment by horses	Died	Limbs could not be torn off and had to be cut.
26 September 1803	Joseph Samuel	Parramatta; New South Wales, Australia	Hanging	Survived	Survived three attempts to hang him. Sentence commuted to life imprisonment. Samuel was later lost at sea during an escape attempt.
15 August 1812	William Booth	Stafford, Staffordshire, England	Hanging	Died	Survived the first attempt to hang him after he fell through the scaffold's trap door to the floor. Died in a second hanging two hours later.
11 October 1833	Charles Getter	Getter's Island, Easton; Pennsylvania, United States	Hanging by upright jerker	Died	Survived the first attempt to hang him when the rope broke. Died in a second hanging a short time later.
25 August 1845	Jacob Charmel	Hellevoetsluis, Netherlands	Firing squad	Died	Charmel survived the first volley from the six-person squad, and during a second volley, one of the officers' rifles misfired. After a physician confirmed that Charmel was still alive, the officer whose gun had misfired was ordered to fire a final shot from close range. Charmel was the last person to be executed by firing squad in the Netherlands.
21 August 1851	John McCaffary	Kenosha; Wisconsin, United States	Hanging	Died	The hanging was initially unsuccessful and he strangled for approximately 20 minutes. This resulted in the abolition of capital punishment in Wisconsin.
10 February 1854	John Tapner	St Peter Port, Guernsey	Hanging	Died	The rope did not break his neck, and he died from strangulation after hanging for 12 minutes.
28 April 1858	Pieter Jan Geurts	Maastricht, Netherlands	Hanging	Died	Witnesses reported Geurts struggling for several minutes after falling through the trapdoor.
3 February 1860	James Stephens	The Tombs, New York City, United States	Hanging by upright jerker	Died	He contorted and gurgled before asphyxiating to death.
26 April 1861	Paula Angel	Las Vegas; New Mexico Territory, United States	Hanging	Died	No gallows were available, so she was instead tied to a cottonwood tree and placed on a wagon attached to a team of horses. Antonio Abad Herrera, the county sheriff and executioner, did not want to tie her arms, so when the wagon began moving she was able to grab hold of the noose. Herrera attempted to pull her downward, but the crowd prevented him from doing so and cut her free. There was potential for a riot, as some in the crowd believed that she was entitled to be released, but order was maintained and the second attempt was successful.
26 March 1863	Henry Manns	Darlinghurst Gaol, Sydney; New South Wales, Australia	Hanging	Died	The rope slipped from his neck and caught around the front of his face, causing a prolonged and agonising execution.
10 November 1865	Henry Wirz	Old Capitol Prison, Washington, D.C., United States	Hanging	Died	The standard drop used failed to break his neck and he died slowly due to strangulation.
4 March 1870	Thomas Scott	Upper Fort Garry, Red River Settlement present-day Winnipeg, Manitoba, Canada	Firing squad	Died	Several witnesses reported that the first salvo did not kill him and he was subsequently shot point-blank in the head with a revolver. He was not pronounced dead, but was placed inside a coffin, where it is possible he died shortly after.
24 March 1873	Mary Ann Cotton	Durham County Gaol, Durham, England	Hanging	Died	The rope was rigged too short to break her neck and she instead died slowly from strangulation.
16 May 1879	Wallace Wilkerson	Provo jail yard, Provo; Utah Territory, United States	Firing squad	Died	Died from bleeding 15 minutes after shots were fired but missed his heart.
9 June 1879	Joseph Mutter	Brisbane; Queensland, Australia	Hanging	Died	Decapitated after dropping through the trapdoor because the hangman claimed the rope was 'frosty'.
22 November 1883	Mampuru II	Old Pretoria Gaol, Bosman and Visagie Streets, Pretoria, South Africa	Hanging	Died	He survived the initial drop when the rope snapped. Executioners marched him back up the gallows stairs and hanged him a second time.
23 February 1885	John "Babbacombe" Lee	Exeter Prison, Exeter, England	Hanging	Survived	Survived two attempts after the trapdoor of the gallows failed to open; sentence subsequently commuted to life imprisonment.
25 May 1885	Moses Shrimpton	Worcester County Prison, Worcester, England	Hanging	Died	His neck muscles were weak and he was decapitated.
30 November 1885	Robert Goodale	Norwich Castle, Norwich, England	Hanging	Died	The rope was too long and overmeasured, causing him to be decapitated.
28 February 1887	Roxana Druse	Herkimer; New York, United States	Hanging by upright jerker	Died	The last woman hanged in the state of New York, and the first woman hanged in 40 years in Central New York. Her botched execution did not kill her instantly, further motivating New York officials to replace the gallows with the electric chair in New York.
6 August 1890	William Kemmler	Auburn State Prison, Auburn; New York, United States	Electrocution	Died	The first man to be electrocuted using the electric chair, the execution took eight minutes as blood vessels under the skin ruptured and bled out.

=== 20th century ===
Date	Name	Place of execution	Method of execution	Outcome	Description
25 January 1901	Martin Stickles	Kalama; Washington, United States	Hanging	Died	The drop was miscalculated, causing his neck to be severely lacerated.
26 April 1901	Tom "Black Jack" Ketchum	Clayton; New Mexico Territory, United States	Hanging	Died	The rope used was too long and he was decapitated. This was exacerbated by the fact that he had gained a considerable amount of weight while in custody prior to his execution.
13 February 1906	William Williams	Ramsey County Jail, Saint Paul; Minnesota, United States	Hanging	Died	He hit the floor after dropping through the trap door of the gallows. Three men above had to hold his body up by the rope for over 14 minutes until Williams finally died of strangulation.
18 March 1915	Wenceslao Moguel	Halachó, Yucatán, Mexico	Firing squad	Survived	He was shot nine times before a coup de grâce shot was made. He survived, although he was disfigured; he died in 1976.
7 October 1921	"John Doe" Hamilton	Fairbanks; Territory of Alaska, United States	Hanging	Died	The drop was too long and he was decapitated by the rope.
7 September 1929	Constantine Beaver	Fairbanks; Territory of Alaska, United States	Hanging	Died	The drop did not break his neck and he died of strangulation.
21 February 1930	Eva Dugan	Arizona State Prison Complex – Florence, Florence; Arizona, United States	Hanging	Died	She was decapitated by the rope.
2 October 1930	Gordon Northcott	San Quentin State Prison, San Quentin; California, United States	Hanging	Died	The rope was too slack to break his neck. It took 13 minutes for him to die from strangulation.
24 February 1931	Nathan Burton	Florida State Prison, Raiford; Florida, United States	Electrocution	Died	50 seconds into the application of electricity the high-voltage wire connected to Florida's state chair snapped, resulting in an arc flash. Power was cut immediately and the wire was spliced, however the prison physician found Burton to already be dead.
29 March 1935	Thomasina Sarao	Bordeaux Prison, Montreal; Quebec, Canada	Hanging	Died	Her weight was miscalculated and she was decapitated.
24 January 1936	Allen Foster	Central Prison, Raleigh; North Carolina, United States	Gas chamber	Died	Foster was the first person to be executed in North Carolina's gas chamber. It took him 10 minutes to lose consciousness. His eyes visibly showed signs of suffering and his head rolled back while he was asphyxiating in the hydrocyanic gas. Foster started to violently convulse and continued to do so throughout the 10-minute period that he was conscious, jerking his head forward onto his chest, his eyes bulging, before finally losing consciousness. It took over 12 minutes for him to die.
13 July 1936	Earl Gardner	Near Coolidge Dam, San Carlos Apache Indian Reservation; Arizona, United States	Hanging	Died	While falling through the trapdoor, his shoulder struck its side, breaking his fall and causing him to strangle for over half an hour. Following the execution, Congress passed a law stating that all federal executions must be carried out using whatever method was used in each state. Previously, all federal executions had to be carried out by hanging on federal territory.
3 May 1946	Willie Francis	St. Martin Parish Jail, St. Martinville; Louisiana, United States	Electrocution	Survived	"Gruesome Gertie", Louisiana's portable electric chair, was improperly set up before the execution by an intoxicated guard and inmate, resulting in the current not being strong enough to kill Francis or knock him unconscious. The execution failed as a result and Francis could be heard shouting "Take it off! Take it off! Let me breathe!" by witnesses. He was successfully executed a year later.
1 June 1946	Ion Antonescu	Jilava Prison, Jilava, Romania	Firing squad	Died	It took 12 minutes for Antonescu and Constantin Z. Vasiliu to die. The head of the execution squad used his pistol to finish one man and then a rifle taken from one of the firing-squad gendarmes to finish the other.
16 October 1946	Some of the Nuremberg executions	Nuremberg Prison, Nuremberg, Germany	Hanging	Died	It is likely that miscalculations may have led to the executioner using ropes that were too short for some executions, resulting in a failure to break the victim's neck and therefore a slower death from strangulation, although the United States Army denied this. Furthermore, the trapdoor of the gallows had been constructed so small that some condemned struck the sides of the trapdoor during the drop.
15 November 1949	Nathuram Godse	Ambala Central Jail, Ambala, India	Hanging	Died	The rope failed to break his neck, and it took 15 minutes for him to die from strangulation.
28 April 1950	Alejandro Carrillo	New Bilibid Prison, Muntinlupa, Metro Manila, Philippines	Electrocution	Died	He survived the initial shock due to an electrical malfunction and had to be electrocuted a second time before being declared dead.
10 September 1951	Eliseo J. Mares Jr.	Utah State Prison, Point of the Mountain, Utah, United States	Firing squad	Died	The firing squad missed the intended target on the body, resulting in a prolonged death.
19 June 1953	Ethel Rosenberg	Sing Sing Prison, Ossining; New York, United States	Electrocution	Died	Ethel and Julius Rosenberg were a married couple in New York, convicted of spying for the Soviet Union. Julius's execution was carried out with no complications. Ethel was given three jolts of electricity and after her restraints were removed, doctors determined that she was still alive. She was given two more jolts, with smoke rising from the head electrode, before she was pronounced dead.
24 February 1956	James Larry Upton	New Mexico State Penitentiary, Santa Fe; New Mexico, United States	Electrocution	Died	Upton was the last person to be executed in New Mexico's electric chair before the state abandoned it in favor of the gas chamber. The cap for the head electrode would not fit Upton, so a cap was improvised from a parka for the execution. During his execution, the fur on the parka started billowing smoke and later ignited into flames from the high voltage of electricity.
11 December 1962	Arthur Lucas	Don Jail, Toronto; Ontario, Canada	Hanging	Died	Lucas was one of the last two men to be executed in Canada. He was almost completely decapitated due to the executioner miscalculating his weight.
20 April 1963	Julián Grimau	Carabanchel Prison, Madrid, Spain	Firing squad	Died	The soldiers conducting the firing squad were nervous and botched the execution.
31 March 1967	Emeterio Orzame Jr.	New Bilibid Prison, Muntinlupa, Metro Manila, Philippines	Electrocution	Died	He ripped through his leather straps and jumped out of the electric chair just as the execution was about to begin, before having to be restrapped back into the chair to be successfully executed.
7 August 1975	Maru Sira	Bogambara Prison, Kandy, Sri Lanka	Hanging	Died	He was unconscious during his execution because he was sedated prior with largactil, an antipsychotic drug, to prevent an escape attempt. During Sira's execution, he was laid down on the trapdoor, causing the rope to not fracture his neck, leading him to strangle.
13 January 1979	Ginggaew Lorsoungnern	Bang Kwang Central Prison; Nonthaburi Province, Thailand	Shooting by machine gun	Died	She survived an initial round of ten shots. Because of Ginggaew's situs inversus, none of the bullets had struck her right-sided heart. After being brought to the morgue, it was discovered that she was still alive. She died after a second round of gunfire.
10 August 1982	Frank J. Coppola	Virginia State Penitentiary, Richmond; Virginia, United States	Electrocution	Died	Coppola's execution was the first in Virginia in twenty years and the first botched execution after 1976. Two 55-second jolts of electricity were required. Witnesses reported seeing fire emitted from the electrode attached to Coppola's leg.
22 April 1983	John Louis Evans	William C. Holman Correctional Facility, Atmore; Alabama, United States	Electrocution	Died	Evans's execution was the first in Alabama after 1965. In Alabama's electric chair, "Yellow Mama", it took three charges and 24 minutes for him to die, leaving his body charred and smoldering.
2 September 1983	Jimmy Lee Gray	Mississippi State Penitentiary, Parchman; Mississippi, United States	Gas chamber	Died	Gray's execution was the first in Mississippi after 1964. He repeatedly banged his head into an iron bar while being gassed. After Gray's execution, head restraints were added onto the iron bar inside of the gas chamber.
5 June 1984	Al-Sadek Hamed Al-Shuwehdy	Basketball stadium, Benghazi, Libya	Hanging	Died	The drop was too short, causing him to strangle. He died after his legs were pulled by Huda Ben Amer.
12 December 1984	Alpha Otis O'Daniel Stephens	Georgia Diagnostic and Classification Center, Jackson; Georgia, United States	Electrocution	Died	The first charge of two-minute, 2,080-volt electricity administered failed to kill him. Eight minutes passed before a second successful charge.
13 March 1985	Stephen Peter Morin	Huntsville Unit, Huntsville; Texas, United States	Lethal injection	Died	He had to be probed with needles in his arms and legs for 45 minutes, before a suitable vein could be found.
16 October 1985	William Earl Vandiver	Indiana State Prison, Michigan City; Indiana, United States	Electrocution	Died	He was still breathing after the first jolt of 2,300 volts. It took a total of five jolts and 17 minutes to kill Vandiver. Vandiver's attorney, who had witnessed the execution, described smoke and a burning smell.
20 August 1986	Randy Lynn Woolls	Huntsville Unit, Huntsville; Texas, United States	Lethal injection	Died	The technicians required Woolls' assistance find a useable vein.
24 June 1987	Elliot Rod Johnson	Huntsville Unit, Huntsville; Texas, United States	Lethal injection	Died	His veins collapsed, making the execution take almost an hour.
13 December 1988	Raymond Landry Sr.	Huntsville Unit, Huntsville; Texas, United States	Lethal injection	Died	The execution took 40 minutes and 24 minutes for Landry to die. Two minutes into his execution, the syringe came undone from his vein, spraying chemicals across the room, towards the witnesses. It took 14 minutes to reinsert the needle into his vein. Landry groaned at least once during his execution.
24 May 1989	Stephen Albert McCoy	Huntsville Unit, Huntsville; Texas, United States	Lethal injection	Died	The drug caused convulsions, which caused his chest to heave. He gasped, choked, and arched his back. A witness fainted during the execution.
14 July 1989	Horace Franklin Dunkins Jr.	William C. Holman Correctional Facility, Atmore; Alabama, United States	Electrocution	Died	The cables of the electrodes were improperly connected and he survived the first jolt of electricity. After the cables were properly reconnected, he was killed by another jolt. The entire execution took 19 minutes for him to die.
4 May 1990	Jesse Joseph Tafero	Florida State Prison, Raiford; Florida, United States	Electrocution	Died	Florida's electric chair malfunctioned, causing six-inch flames to shoot out of Tafero's head. Three jolts of electricity were required to execute Tafero, in a process that took seven minutes.
12 September 1990	Charles Thomas Walker	Stateville Correctional Center; Illinois, United States	Lethal injection	Died	Walker's execution was the first in Illinois since 1962. During his execution, there was a kink in the IV tubing and the needle was pointed away his heart, prolonging his execution.
17 October 1990	Wilbert Lee Evans	Virginia State Penitentiary, Richmond; Virginia, United States	Electrocution	Died	Witnesses observed blood gushing from Evans's eyes, nose, and mouth when the electricity was administered. It took two shocks to execute him.
16 April 1991	Huang Chia-ching	Taipei Detention Center, Tucheng District, Taipei County, Taiwan	Shooting	Died	Because he agreed to donate his organs, he was shot once in the head, and declared dead. Upon arrival at Taipei Veterans General Hospital for organ harvesting, doctors discovered he still had a heartbeat, was breathing unaided, and showed pupil responses. Doctors refused to remove his organs and placed him in intensive care. Following orders from the Ministry of Justice, he was returned to the execution ground and shot a second time 34 hours after the initial attempt.
22 August 1991	Derick Lynn Peterson	Greensville Correctional Center, Jarratt; Virginia, United States	Electrocution	Died	After a cycle of 1,725 volts for 10 seconds, followed by 240 volts for 90 seconds, the prison physician determined that he was still alive. The cycle had to be repeated a second time for Peterson to die.
24 January 1992	Rickey Ray Rector	Cummins Unit, Grady; Arkansas, United States	Lethal injection	Died	It took the execution staff were unable to find a suitable vein. After 50 minutes, Rector helped them locate a suitable site. Witnesses heard Rector loudly moan eight times throughout his execution.
10 March 1992	Robyn Leroy Parks	Oklahoma State Penitentiary, McAlester; Oklahoma, United States	Lethal injection	Died	The drug caused convulsions. His abdomen, jaw, and neck spasmed for 45 seconds; he also violently gagged and gasped 11 minutes after administration.
6 April 1992	Donald Eugene Harding	Arizona State Prison Complex – Florence, Florence; Arizona, United States	Gas chamber	Died	Harding's execution was the first in Arizona since the 1976 Supreme Court reinstatement of the death penalty. His asphyxiation took 11 minutes before death was finally confirmed. Throughout his execution, he had multiple violent convulsions and spasms.
23 April 1992	Billy Wayne White	Huntsville Unit, Huntsville; Texas, United States	Lethal injection	Died	There were issues with finding a suitable vein due to past heroin abuse and he had to assist the authorities; he was pronounced dead 47 minutes after initially being strapped to the gurney.
7 May 1992	Justin Lee May	Huntsville Unit, Huntsville; Texas, United States	Lethal injection	Died	He coughed, gasped, groaned, and lifted up against the gurney's restraints.
10 May 1994	John Wayne Gacy	Stateville Correctional Center; Illinois, United States	Lethal injection	Died	The chemicals unexpectedly solidified and clogged the IV line; the execution took 18 minutes.
15 June 1994	David Scarborough Lawson	Central Prison, Raleigh; North Carolina, United States	Gas chamber	Died	Lawson's execution was the first gas chamber execution in North Carolina since the Supreme Court ended the moratorium on executions in 1976. During his execution, he screamed "I am human" multiple times with mucus pouring out of his nose, onto his leather blindfold, while he was groaning at the same time. His screams slowly muffled after each minute. One of his leg restraints also broke loose due to repeated straining after sulfuric acid splashed onto his right leg. Lawson's execution took about 10 minutes until his death and his body still quivered afterwards. North Carolina's gas chamber was only used once more, before being retired.
3 May 1995	Emmitt Foster	Potosi Correctional Center, Mineral Point; Missouri, United States	Lethal injection	Died	The chemicals stopped circulating due to the tightness of the straps, prolonging his execution. He died several minutes after a prison worker loosened the straps.
10 November 1995	Ken Saro-Wiwa	Port Harcourt Maximum Security Prison, Port Harcourt, Rivers State, Nigeria	Hanging	Died	Due to faulty gallows equipment, there were four unsuccessful attempts to hang him; he was successfully hanged on the fifth attempt.
4 December 1995	Jerry White	Florida State Prison, Raiford; Florida, United States	Electrocution	Died	Witnesses reported that when the electricity was first administered, White let out a scream that faded in intensity as the execution continued. In 1999, during hearings for Florida to determine if the electric chair was a constitutional method of execution, a witness said he heard White breathing as the electricity flowed through his body, but he could not tell if White was inhaling or exhaling.
23 January 1996	Richard Townes Jr.	Greensville Correctional Center, Jarratt; Virginia, United States	Lethal injection	Died	His execution was delayed by 22 minutes due to unsuccessful attempts to establish an IV line in his arms; a needle was finally inserted in the top of his right foot.
18 July 1996	Tommie Joe Smith	Indiana State Prison, Michigan City; Indiana, United States	Lethal injection	Died	After 16 minutes of failing to find an adequate vein, a physician was called; lethal drugs were injected 49 minutes after the initial attempts and he was pronounced dead 20 minutes later.
13 September 1996	Pedro Castillo	Canada Penal Farm, Escuintla, Guatemala	Firing squad	Died	Both men survived the initial volley of the firing squad and had to each be administered a coup de grâce with a handgun.
13 September 1996	Roberto Girón Mendoza	Canada Penal Farm, Escuintla, Guatemala	Firing squad	Died	Both men survived the initial volley of the firing squad and had to each be administered a coup de grâce with a handgun.
14 November 1996	Larry Grant Lonchar	Georgia Diagnostic and Classification Center, Jackson; Georgia, United States	Electrocution	Died	He had to be electrocuted with a second charge after having survived the first two-minute electrical charge. Lonchar's autopsy photos later showed severe burns, as well as disfigurement, on his left thigh and the top of his head, with these photos later contributing to the outlawing of the electric chair in Georgia.
25 March 1997	Pedro Luis Medina	Florida State Prison, Raiford; Florida, United States	Electrocution	Died	During his execution in Florida's electric chair, Medina's head burst into twelve-inch crown shaped flames and filled the chamber with smoke.
8 May 1997	Scott Dawn Carpenter	Oklahoma State Penitentiary, McAlester; Oklahoma, United States	Lethal injection	Died	He gasped, made a guttural sound, shook, and spasmed for three minutes before ceasing movement; he died eight minutes later.
13 June 1997	Michael Eugene Elkins	Broad River Correctional Institution, Columbia; South Carolina, United States	Lethal injection	Died	It took nearly an hour of probing, with him trying to assist in finding a suitable vein, until they found a suitable one in his neck.
11 August 1997	Zoleykhah Kadkhoda	Bukan, West Azerbaijan Province, Iran	Stoning	Survived	She was found alive at a morgue after her public stoning.
10 February 1998	Manuel Martínez Coronado	Pavon Prison, Fraijanes, Guatemala	Lethal injection	Died	There were malfuctions with the lethal injection machine and trouble with finding his veins, causing the execution to last 18 minutes long.
22 April 1998	Joseph John Cannon	Huntsville Unit, Huntsville; Texas, United States	Lethal injection	Died	One of his veins collapsed and a needle popped out, with them reinserting it 15 minutes later and with him making a second final statement.
26 August 1998	Genaro Ruiz Camacho	Huntsville Unit, Huntsville; Texas, United States	Lethal injection	Died	His execution was delayed by two hours due to problems with finding a suitable vein in his arms.
5 October 1998	Roderick Tyrone Abeyta	Nevada State Prison, Carson City; Nevada, United States	Lethal injection	Died	It took 25 minutes for a suitable vein to be found, with him assisting them.
8 July 1999	Allen Lee Davis	Florida State Prison, Raiford; Florida, United States	Electrocution	Died	Davis was the last person to be executed by electric chair in Florida. He bled profusely from the nose while being electrocuted, and he suffered burns to his head, leg, and groin area. His execution caused an uproar and Florida switched to lethal injection as their primary execution method. The electric chair became only a secondary method of execution in Florida and the rest of the states that allow it.
2 May 2000	Christina Marie Riggs	Cummins Unit, Grady; Arkansas, United States	Lethal injection	Died	Her execution was delayed by 18 minutes due to the prison staff having trouble finding suitable veins in her elbows; needles were inserted into her wrists after she agreed to it.
7 June 2000	Bennie Demps	Florida State Prison, Raiford; Florida, United States	Lethal injection	Died	The technicians tried for 30 minutes to find a suitable vein. Demps exclaimed to witnesses and his lawyer that he was being "butchered" by prison officers and accused them of cutting him in the leg and groin. The delay led to the execution taking nearly an hour to be finally carried out, and Demps was pronounced dead at 6:53 p.m. local time.
29 June 2000	Luis Amílcar Cetino Pérez	Pavon Prison, Fraijanes, Guatemala	Lethal injection	Died	Pérez died after 8 to 9 minutes of visible agony and Hernández died about 7 minutes after his injection. A priest who witnessed said afterward that both men looked like they suffered greatly.
29 June 2000	Tomás Cerrate Hernández	Pavon Prison, Fraijanes, Guatemala	Lethal injection	Died	Pérez died after 8 to 9 minutes of visible agony and Hernández died about 7 minutes after his injection. A priest who witnessed said afterward that both men looked like they suffered greatly.
7 December 2000	Claude Howard Jones	Huntsville Unit, Huntsville; Texas, United States	Lethal injection	Died	His execution was delayed by half an hour due to trouble with finding a suitable vein for IV access; a suitable vein was eventually found in his left calf.

=== 21st century ===
Date	Name	Place of execution	Method of execution	Outcome	Description
6 November 2001	Jose Martinez High	Georgia Diagnostic and Classification Center, Jackson; Georgia, United States	Lethal injection	Died	The technicians tried to find a useable vein for 15 to 20 minutes. A needle was eventually stuck into High's hand, while a physician inserted one between his shoulder and neck.
13 December 2005	Stanley Williams	San Quentin State Prison, San Quentin; California, United States	Lethal injection	Died	It took about 20 minutes for prison staffers to establish IV lines after searching for suitable veins. During this process, he questioned the staffers and asked if they were doing their jobs correctly. Williams' execution process initially began shortly after midnight and he was pronounced dead within 34 minutes, at 12:35 a.m. local time.
2 May 2006	Joseph Lewis Clark	Southern Ohio Correctional Facility, Lucasville, Ohio, United States	Lethal injection	Died	The execution took nearly 90 minutes. According to prison officials his vein had collapsed. Clark's arm swelled up, and witnesses heard Clark saying, "It don't work!" at least five times. It took another 30 minutes to locate a suitable vein while witnesses heard "groans, screams and guttural noises."
13 December 2006	Ángel Nieves Díaz	Florida State Prison, Raiford; Florida, United States	Lethal injection	Died	He needed a second dose of drugs to be executed. The full process took approximately 34 minutes as opposed to the usual seven and a half minutes. A post-mortem examination revealed that Díaz's IVs were improperly inserted past his veins into his subcutaneous soft tissue, causing severe chemical burns.
30 December 2006	Saddam Hussein	Camp Justice, Kadhimiya, Baghdad, Iraq	Hanging	Died	His neck was lacerated and his face was bruised during his hanging. Shortly after his hanging, a video was uploaded online, showing Hussein's corpse on a gurney with a gaping wound on his neck.
15 January 2007	Barzan Ibrahim al-Tikriti	Camp Justice, Kadhimiya, Baghdad, Iraq	Hanging	Died	He was decapitated as a result of an error in the calculations resulting in him being dropped too far.
30 March 2007	Siddique ul-Islam	Mymensingh Central Jail, Mymensingh, Bangladesh	Hanging	Died	He was decapitated during his hanging due to his weight being miscalculated.
24 May 2007	Christopher J. Newton	Southern Ohio Correctional Facility, Lucasville, Ohio, United States	Lethal injection	Died	The technicians tried at least 10 times to find a suitable vein. The execution took almost two hours.
26 June 2007	John Washington Hightower	Georgia Diagnostic and Classification Center, Jackson; Georgia, United States	Lethal injection	Died	It took 40 minutes for the technician to find a suitable vein, and death was pronounced about 20 minutes later.
4 June 2008	Curtis Osborne	Georgia Diagnostic and Classification Center, Jackson; Georgia, United States	Lethal injection	Died	When the prison medical staff began trying to find suitable veins to insert the IV, they struggled for 35 minutes, and it took 14 another minutes for death to be pronounced.
15 September 2009	Romell Broom	Southern Ohio Correctional Facility, Lucasville, Ohio, United States	Lethal injection	Survived	Cried in pain after being pierced by needles 18 times. The execution was called off after two hours. A second execution was scheduled for 2022, but he died in prison in 2020 before it could be carried out.
27 September 2010	Brandon Joseph Rhode	Georgia Diagnostic and Classification Center, Jackson; Georgia, United States	Lethal injection	Died	Technicians took 30 minutes to find a suitable vein, and it took 14 another minutes for death to be pronounced.
18 June 2013	Hajjaj Mohammad Adel Al-Saadi	Central Prison Complex, Sulaibiya, Kuwait	Hanging	Died	His neck did not fracture, leading him to strangle and struggle for 45 seconds. He died nine minutes and 20 seconds later, and was officially pronounced dead 22 minutes later.
9 October 2013	Alireza M.	Bojnourd Prison, Bojnourd, Iran	Hanging	Survived	He was found alive at a morgue after hanging for 12 minutes.
16 January 2014	Dennis McGuire	Southern Ohio Correctional Facility, Lucasville, Ohio, United States	Lethal injection	Died	Executed using a new, untried and untested lethal drug combination and took over 25 minutes to die.
29 April 2014	Clayton Derrell Lockett	Oklahoma State Penitentiary, McAlester; Oklahoma, United States	Lethal injection	Died	Was observed convulsing and attempting to speak for 43 minutes after the drugs were administered. Ultimately died of a heart attack.
23 July 2014	Joseph Rudolph Wood III	Arizona State Prison Complex – Florence, Florence; Arizona, United States	Lethal injection	Died	Instead of the usual ten minutes with one dose being sufficient to kill him, he underwent a two-hour injection procedure in which he was injected with the drug cocktail 15 times.
12 January 2015	Laila Bint Abdul Muttalib Basim	Mecca, Saudi Arabia	Beheading by sword	Died	It took three blows for her head to be successfully separated.
4 August 2015	Shafqat Hussain s/o Shahzullah Zaman	Central Jail Karachi, Karachi; Sindh, Pakistan	Hanging	Died	His neck was lacerated during his hanging and his brother claimed that he was partially decapitated when his corpse was handed over.
9 December 2015	Brian Keith Terrell	Georgia Diagnostic and Classification Center, Jackson; Georgia, United States	Lethal injection	Died	The technician tried for an hour to find suitable veins in his arms, and eventually found a vein in his right hand. he winced several times during his execution, apparently in pain.
3 February 2016	Brandon Astor Jones	Georgia Diagnostic and Classification Center, Jackson; Georgia, United States	Lethal injection	Died	Technicians tried for 32 minutes to find usable veins in his arms, and eventually called for a doctor to open a line near Jones' groin; this took another 13 minutes. Jones' eyes popped open six minutes later, prior to his death.
8 December 2016	Ronald Bert Smith Jr.	William C. Holman Correctional Facility, Atmore; Alabama, United States	Lethal injection	Died	He coughed and heaved for 13 minutes, and moved during consciousness checks.
18 January 2017	Ricky Javon Gray	Greensville Correctional Center, Jarratt; Virginia, United States	Lethal injection	Died	The execution took 33 minutes. Gray was in respiratory distress shortly after the midazolam was injected as a part of the three-drug-cocktail then in usage. His post-mortem autopsy found foamy liquid in his upper airways, indicating that his lungs were overflowing with fluid that was spilling out into his mouth and throat.
15 March 2017	Suthar a/l Batumalai	Kajang Prison, Selangor, Malaysia	Hanging	Died	His neck was not broken, there were strangulation marks on his neck, and his face was swollen.
19 October 2017	Torrey Twane McNabb	William C. Holman Correctional Facility, Atmore; Alabama, United States	Lethal injection	Died	The execution took 35 minutes. McNabb's attorney said that his movements during the execution showed problems with the midazolam used for sedation.
15 November 2017	Alva Campbell	Southern Ohio Correctional Facility, Lucasville, Ohio, United States	Lethal injection	Survived	Executioners were unable to find a suitable vein. A second attempt was scheduled for 2019, but he died in prison from natural causes in 2018.
22 Febuary 2018	Doyle Lee Hamm	William C. Holman Correctional Facility, Atmore; Alabama, United States	Lethal injection	Survived	Was stabbed with needles for more than two and a half hours, including in the groin and bladder, as the execution team tried to locate a suitable vein. The execution failed. The State of Alabama later agreed not to attempt to execute him again as part of a confidential settlement, thus de facto commuting his sentence to life imprisonment without parole. He died of cancer in prison in 2021.
16 July 2020	Wesley Ira Purkey	United States Penitentiary, Terre Haute; Indiana, United States	Lethal injection	Died	The Supreme Court ruled that Purkey could be executed despite concerns that he had Alzheimer's disease and could not understand why he was being executed. He was executed that day. His autopsy results showed that he suffered from a flash pulmonary edema, which feels like drowning while still alive.
28 October 2021	John Marion Grant	Oklahoma State Penitentiary, McAlester; Oklahoma, United States	Lethal injection	Died	Most witnesses observed Grant convulsing, straining against his restraints, struggling to breathe, and vomiting. He took 21 minutes to die. His autopsy showed that the execution drugs caused him to suffer a flash pulmonary edema.
11 May 2022	Clarence Dixon	Arizona State Prison Complex – Florence, Florence; Arizona, United States	Lethal injection	Died	The technicians tried for 25 minutes to find a suitable vein, and Dixon appeared to be in pain during these attempts. They eventually inserted an IV into his groin; he grimaced even more during this process.
8 June 2022	Frank Jarvis Atwood	Arizona State Prison Complex – Florence, Florence; Arizona, United States	Lethal injection	Died	He had to assist his executioners in finding a suitable vein after mutiple attempts by the technicians to use veins in his arms. On Atwood's suggestion, they inserted the needle into his hand. The entire execution took about 30 minutes.
28 July 2022	Joe Nathan James Jr.	William C. Holman Correctional Facility, Atmore; Alabama, United States	Lethal injection	Died	His execution took three hours to complete. An autopsy showed that prison officials had difficulty inserting IVs into James's body, resorting to attempting to establish IV lines in his knuckles and inadvertently puncturing his muscles. James's execution was the longest known completed botched execution in American history.
22 September 2022	Alan Eugene Miller	William C. Holman Correctional Facility, Atmore; Alabama, United States	Lethal injection	Survived	Miller claimed that he filed paperwork requesting Alabama's new and unused execution method of nitrogen hypoxia, but officials were not ready to carry out an execution by hypoxia and claimed that they did not have his paperwork, so he was subjected to lethal injection. For over two hours, prison officials attempted to establish an IV line 18 times before calling off the execution due to the midnight deadline for Miller's execution warrant approaching. Afterwards, Alabama officials agreed to never again subject Miller to lethal injection and that he could only be put to death by nitrogen hypoxia. He was executed on 26 September 2024, via nitrogen hypoxia.
16 November 2022	Murray Hooper	Arizona State Prison Complex – Florence, Florence; Arizona, United States	Lethal injection	Died	The technicians could not find a suitable vein in either arm, and eventually inserted a catheter into his femoral vein near his groin.
16 November 2022	Stephen Dale Barbee	Huntsville Unit, Huntsville; Texas, United States	Lethal injection	Died	The execution was complicated by Barbee's disability, where he was unable to straighten his arms sufficiently to insert the drugs. The execution took 90 minutes.
17 November 2022	Kenneth Eugene Smith	William C. Holman Correctional Facility, Atmore; Alabama, United States	Lethal injection	Survived	Multiple attempts were made to put an IV into Smith's arms, and he was repeatedly stabbed with the needle near his collarbone. Prison officials called off the execution; Smith remained strapped to the gurney and was not immediately alerted to the fact that he was not to be executed that night. Smith's attempted execution prompted Alabama governor Kay Ivey to temporarily suspend the death penalty in Alabama to allow for an investigation into the state's botched lethal injections. On 25 January 2024, Smith was executed by nitrogen hypoxia.
28 February 2024	Thomas Eugene Creech	Idaho Maximum Security Institution, Kuna; Idaho, United States	Lethal injection	Survived	The execution was called off after the medical team failed to establish an IV line for the lethal injection drugs.
11 April 2025	Mikal Mahdi	Broad River Correctional Institution, Columbia; South Carolina, United States	Firing squad	Died	The firing squad missed the intended target on his body, resulting in a prolonged death.
17 October 2025	Richard Djerf	Arizona State Prison Complex – Florence, Florence; Arizona, United States	Lethal injection	Died	As per Djerf's autopsy report, there were seven needle puncture marks on his arms, four on his left and three on his right, due to multiple failed IV access attempts; one of the needles also pierced through a vein, causing the drugs to enter his tissue.
23 October 2025	Anthony Todd Boyd	William C. Holman Correctional Facility, Atmore; Alabama, United States	Nitrogen hypoxia	Died	Boyd struggled for over 30 minutes with the gas still flowing while strapped onto the gurney, gasping for air about 225 times, prolonging his death.
21 May 2026	Tony Von Carruthers	Riverbend Maximum Security Institution, Nashville; Tennessee, United States	Lethal injection	Survived	The medical team successfully established one IV line but was unable to find a vein for a backup line, and the execution was called off. The attempted execution prompted Tennessee governor Bill Lee to grant a one-year reprieve to Carruthers.
30 September 2026	Christa Pike	Riverbend Maximum Security Institution, Nashville; Tennessee, United States	Lethal injection	Survived	After the initial injection, she was reported as saying that her arm felt like it was going to "burst open." The medical team administered second dose of pentobarbital, spaced apart, but that did not stop her heart. Pike was transported to an off-site medical facility after the failure of both doses. As a result of the botched executions of both Pike and Tony Von Carruthers, as well as the singularity of Pike's survival, Tennessee governor Bill Lee paused all executions scheduled for 2026 to allow for a third-party review of Pike's execution and Tennessee's lethal injection protocols.
19 November 2026	Reinaldo Dennes	Huntsville Unit, Huntsville; Texas, United States	Lethal injection	Died	There were multiple failed attempts to insert IV lines, leading him to groan and yell out in pain for multiple minutes; IV lines were eventually inserted in his left foot and the left side of his neck. The execution took an hour and four minutes.

== Sources ==
- Tórrez, Robert J (2008). Myth of the Hanging Tree: Stories of Crime and Punishment in Territorial New Mexico. Albuquerque: University of New Mexico Press. p. 133. ISBN 978-0-8263-4379-6. OCLC 165082675.
