= Juan José Echeverría =

Colonial official in the Kingdom of Guatemala

Juan José Echeverría y Martínez de Lejarza (November 24, 1769 – May 16, 1851), known as Juan José de Echeverría, was a Basque merchant, administrator, and delegate who most notably served as Corregidor of Quetzaltenango (1819-1821) in the final-years of the Kingdom of Guatemala. He later served in high-government positions during the early-years of the Federal Republic.

== Biography ==
Juan José was born on November 24, 1769, in Goicouria, Gueñes, Navarre (Biscay, Spain); his parents were Juan Antonio de Echeverría and Benita Martínez de Lejarza Loyzaga.

Juan José came to Guatemala at a young age, working as a merchant across New Spain with the firm of his close friend and relative, Juan Bautista Irisarri y Larrain (Father of Antonio José de Irisarri). Upon the outbreak of the Peninsular War in 1808, Juan José and a few other wealthy merchant's in the capital contributed a sum of money to support the Spanish against the Napoleonic invasion.

Juan José first served as the mayor of Guatemala City in 1818, later being appointed as the Corregidor of Quetzaltenango in 1819. He held the position from May 10, 1819, until his resignation on September 30, 1821. During his rule, a tense hostility formed with the criollo elites, the militia, and the city council eventually forced him to resign his position. Following the conclusion of Independence, Juan José served as a deputy and was the last Secretary of the Consulate of Commerce in 1829, when it was suppressed by General Francisco Morazán. Juan José died on May 16, 1851, in Guatemala City.

== Family ==
On November 10, 1811, at the Metropolitan Cathedral, Juan José married María Ignacia de Arrivillaga y Castilla-Portugal, a member of the Arrivillaga clan. The most notable of their children were Manuel José Echeverría (1817–1902), a powerful statesman and lawyer who notably served as Minister of the Interior (1863-1871) and Magistrate of the Supreme Court (1879-1885)

== See also ==
- History of Guatemala
