= Manuel José Echeverría =

Guatemalan lawyer and statesman

Manuel José María Echeverría y Arrivillaga (May 23, 1817 – February 3, 1902) was a Guatemalan statesman, lawyer, jurist, and intellectual who served as the Minister of the Interior (1847-1871) and Magistrate of the Supreme Court (1879-1885)

== Biography ==
Manuel was born into a prominent family on May 23, 1817, in Guatemala City; his parents were María Ignacia de Arrivillaga y Castilla-Portugal and Juan José Echeverría, a merchant and administrator in the final years of the Kingdom of Guatemala. As a born-member of the Aycinena Clan, the young Manuel was sent to study at the highly-prestigious University of San Carlos, eventually becoming a well-respected lawyer across the capital. On November 26, 1847, Manuel became wed to María de la Encarnación Valdés y Cepeda, with whom he had several children.

Manuel first served in numerous high-ranking government positions under President Rafael Carrera, being appointed the Minister of the Interior by decree on March 21, 1847. He became an active member of the Economic Society of Friends of the Country, the Consulate of Commerce, and the National Academy of the Language.

Upon the triumph of the Liberal Revolution in 1871, Manuel self-exiled to Sonsonate and then Europe (Rome, Florence, Paris, Nice, etc.), returning to Guatemala after negotiations with President Justo Rufino Barrios. He helped draft the Liberal Commercial Code and remained an important figure in the Legislative Assembly under Barrios’ government. Manuel died on February 3, 1902, in Guatemala City.

== See also ==
- History of Guatemala
