= National Civil Police =

National Civil Police may refer to:

- National Civil Police (El Salvador)
- National Civil Police (Guatemala)
