= Angel Nieves =

Angel Nieves may refer to:

- Ángel Nieves Díaz
- A fictional character named Angel Nieves: See List of Ryan's Hope characters#N
