= Dirección General del Sistema Penitenciario de Guatemala =

The Dirección General del Sistema Penitenciario de Guatemala (DGSP "Prison System of Guatemala") is the prison system of Guatemala, headquartered in Zone 1, Guatemala City, Guatemala. It is a part of the Ministry of the Interior.

== Facilities ==
Guatemala City area

- Pavón Prison - Fraijanes
- Centro Preventivo para Hombres - Zone 18, Guatemala City
- Centro de Orientacion Femenino - Fraijanes
- Prisión de Mujeres (Women's Prison) Santa Teresa - Zone 18, Guatemala City

Antigua Guatemala, Sacatepéquez Department

- Prisión de Mujeres (Women's Prison)

Izabal Department

- Centro de Rehabilitación Departamental

Petén Department

- Granja Penal Santa Elena (Prison farm)

Quetzaltenango Department

- Granja de Rehabilitación - Cantel (Prison farm)

Zacapa

- Preventivo Zacapa

Escuintla

- Canadá Penal Farm
