= Domingo de Arrivillaga y Urdinsso =

Basque landowner and administrator in the Kingdom of Guatemala

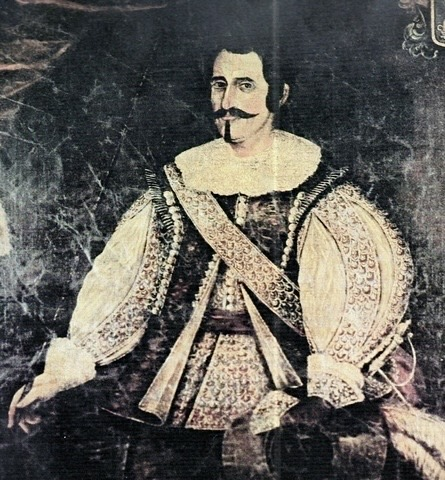

Ordinary Mayor of Santiago de Guatemala
- In office 1 Jan 1653 – 1 Jan 1654
- Preceded by: Juan Sarmiento Valderrama and Carlos Vázquez de Coronado
- Succeeded by: Luis de Gálvez and Fernando Gallardo

Personal details
- Born: Domingo de Arribillaga y Urdinsso; 1605 Irún, Kingdom of Navarre, Spain (now Basque Country)
- Died: December 6, 1664 (aged 58–59) Antigua Guatemala, New Spain (now Guatemala)
- Spouse: María Antonia de Coronado Ulloa
- Occupation: Soldier, settler, administrator

Military service
- Allegiance: Spain
- Rank: Captain of Infantry

Captain Domingo de Arrivillaga y Urdinsso (1605 – December 6, 1664), was a prominent Basque soldier, settler, and administrator in Santiago de Guatemala (present day Antigua Guatemala). He was the progenitor of the aristocratic Arrivillaga clan, which played a pivotal role in Guatemalan history throughout the 17th, 18th, and 19th centuries.

== Biography ==
Arrivillaga was born in Irún, a small town in the Kingdom of Navarre, to García Juanes de Arrivillaga and María Esteban de Urdinsso. The family is said to be descended from Martín de Arribillaga, a Biscayan warlord who fought against Ordoño I of Asturias and Alonso III.

He and his brother traveled to the Americas around 1643, first to the Indies, Panama, and then Guatemala where they inherited a large sugar mill estate from their uncle. Spending years growing the property and accumulating immense wealth, he founded the Mayorazgo de Arrivillaga on August 28, 1656, eventually receiving authorization from Charles II and Queen Regent Mariana of Austria on January 18, 1667, in Madrid. Arrivillaga also held administrative positions, most notably as Mayor of Santiago de Guatemala, a position countless of his descendants would also hold. At some point he also obtained the rank of Captain of Infantry.

== Arrivillaga family ==
Arrivillaga married María Antonia de Coronado Ulloa, a distant relative of Francisco Vázquez de Coronado, Conquistador and Governor of New Galicia. Her father was the Governor and Captain General of the Province of Veragua.

Arrivillaga's descendant's retained immense wealth and influence for centuries, producing countless prominent figures in Guatemalan history and society.

- Antonio de Larrazábal y Arrivillaga, diplomat and cleric who served as deputy of the Cortes of Cádiz and Rector of the University of San Carlos.
- Manuel José Echeverría y Arrivillaga, statesman and lawyer who served as Minister of the Interior under the regime of President Rafael Carrera.
- Alonso de Arrivillaga, Jesuit priest in Sonora, New Spain who served as provincial superior and procurator of missions during the 1710s.
