= Mark Dean Schwab =

American child rapist and murderer (1968–2008)

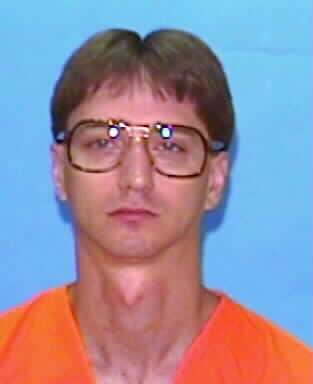
- Born: December 16, 1968; Dover, Ohio, U.S.
- Died: July 1, 2008 (aged 39); Florida State Prison, Florida, U.S.
- Status: Executed by lethal injection
- Convictions: First degree murder Kidnapping; Sexual battery
- Penalty: Death

Mark Dean Schwab (December 16, 1968 – July 1, 2008) was an American murderer and child rapist. He was convicted of the April 18, 1991, rape and murder of 11-year-old Junny Rios-Martinez Jr. and imprisoned at Raiford Prison in Florida. Schwab was convicted of the crime in 1992 and sentenced to death by lethal injection. In addition, he received two life sentences. His execution was the first in Florida after executions were temporarily halted following the botched lethal injection of Ángel Nieves Díaz.

== Early life ==
Schwab was born in Dover, Ohio. Schwab's parents divorced during his childhood and at his 1991 trial, it was alleged that Schwab's father was physically abusive towards his wife and son. According to testimony by Schwab and his mother, the elder Schwab would inflict burns on his son and regularly humiliated him by pulling down his son's pants and then laughing at him. It was also alleged that Schwab had been raped at gunpoint by a friend of his father as a child. He moved to Merritt Island, Florida, and attended Merritt Island High School, but dropped out before completing 11th grade.

== Previous offenses ==
In fall of 1986, at age 17, Schwab committed his first known sex offense involving a male 14-year-old high school sophomore from Brevard County. Schwab had lured the victim into his car by asking for help with his starter before putting a knife to the boy's throat. He drove him to a remote dirt path, where Schwab sexually assaulted him. The crime went unreported until Schwab's first conviction because he had threatened to kill the victim if he spoke out.

In summer of 1987, Schwab abducted a 13-year-old boy from Cocoa Beach, after befriending his family and grooming him. Schwab had offered to bring the boy to a house painting job, but instead drove him to his house. Schwab tied the victim up before repeatedly molesting and raping him at knifepoint over the course of the day. Schwab then returned the boy to his home the same night and attempted to buy his silence with the promise of $200. The victim reported Schwab to the authorities the next day, leading to Schwab being charged with sexual battery and aggravated rape. Although a conviction would have been punishable by a term of imprisonment for life or by a term of imprisonment not exceeding 40 years under Florida law, Schwab received a comparably light prison sentence of eight years. He was released on March 4, 1991, after serving three, when the rest of his sentence was commuted. He was placed on 15 years of probation and required to participate in a sex offender therapy program.

== Murder of Junny Rios-Martinez Jr. ==
A month later, on April 18, Cocoa resident Junny Rios-Martinez Jr. went missing, after failing to show up to a school baseball game. Schwab had seen Rios-Martinez's picture in the March 21, 1991, edition of Florida Today and became friendly with the boy and his family, introducing himself as "Mark Dean" and an associate of Malcom Denemark from that newspaper. Over the next month, Schwab gained the trust of the boy by exploiting his interest in surfing and scheduled future meet-ups under the guise of organizing another photoshoot for Florida Today. In the weeks preceding the abduction, Schwab claimed to have quit his job at the newspaper and taken up work at a surfing magazine, eventually saying that he had found Rios-Martinez a sponsorship with a surf gear company, providing the parents with forged documents as proof, and spent several hours each day designing clothes and surfboards with the boy. Schwab told his parents that he was planning to take their son to a surfing tournament in Daytona Beach on April 18, but the trip was suddenly "canceled" the day before. The day of his disappearance, Rios-Martinez was last spotted getting into a U-Haul truck near his school's baseball field with a man matching Schwab's description.

On April 20, 1991, Schwab called his aunt in Port Washington, Ohio, claiming a man named "Donald" had forced him to kidnap and rape a child under the threat of killing Schwab's mother. The next day, police tapped a phone call with Schwab's aunt's permission, and determined Schwab's location in Ohio. Schwab was arrested, and told police the same story he had relayed to his aunt, claiming to be unaware of the whereabouts of either "Donald" or Rios-Martinez, but offered to assist police in finding Junny's dead body. On April 23, Schwab lead investigators to the body's location in the woods in Canaveral Groves, a rural area of Brevard County, Florida, inside a footlocker that was "nearly shut" covered in palm fronds, debris, and wrapped in rope. An autopsy determined the cause of death as asphyxiation. Schwab changed his story accordingly and insisted that after the rape of Rios-Martinez, "Donald" had forced both into the U-Haul truck and showed him where he would dump the boy's body before releasing Schwab.

Police determined that Schwab had acted alone and lured Rios-Martinez to his truck under the guise that they would be going to the surfing tournament in Daytona Beach after all. Instead, he took Rios-Martinez to a motel, where he bound, gagged and beat the child, cut his clothes off with a knife before raping him. Schwab smothered the boy to death after the act to prevent him from informing the authorities.

Two months before the trial, an unmarked letter was sent to the office of Schwab's attorney, which claimed responsibility for the murder of Junny Rios-Martinez Jr., corroborated Schwab's account of forcing Schwab into raping Rios-Martinez at gunpoint, and threatened to abduct, torture, and kill one of Junny's younger brothers for Schwab's talking about his involvement. The author identified himself as "Doug" rather than "Donald" while the letter itself was found to have been written in Schwab's handwriting and contained fingerprints matching his.

== Trial ==
On May 15, 1991, Schwab appeared in a state court in Brevard County, pleading not guilty to charges of first-degree murder, kidnapping a child under age 13 and sexual assault of a child under age 13. Prosecutors sought the death penalty. Schwab waived his right to a jury trial, and was convicted on May 22, 1992. At trial, witnesses had testified that Schwab was subject to child abuse and raped by a friend of his father when he was young. On July 1, 1992, he was sentenced to death for the murder, and given two life sentences for the kidnapping and sexual battery of a child under the age of 13. In addition, his probation was revoked on the previous rape conviction, and he was re-sentenced to an additional life sentence, giving him a total of three life sentences.

The case led to the passage of the Junny Rios-Martinez Jr., Act of 1992, which prohibited those convicted of sexual battery from receiving early release in the state of Florida.

== In prison ==
After his sentence, he was housed at Florida State Prison in Starke, Florida.

On December 15, 2006, Governor Jeb Bush suspended all pending executions until further notice after the execution of Ángel Nieves Díaz had taken much longer than usual. This ban was lifted when the new Governor of Florida, Charlie Crist, signed Schwab's death warrant on July 18, 2007. Schwab was then transferred to Florida State Prison. He was scheduled for execution by means of lethal injection on November 15, 2007, at 6:00 p.m. EST. However, federal judge Anne C. Conway granted a stay of execution on November 14. On November 15, the 11th Circuit Court of Appeals ruled that the execution could proceed, but the United States Supreme Court blocked the execution later that same day pending a Kentucky case that challenged the three-drug combination used for lethal injection in both Florida and Kentucky.

The Supreme Court upheld Kentucky's death penalty on April 16, 2008, by a vote of 7 to 2. Crist signed a new death warrant for Schwab the next day, without a date for execution. On May 19, the Supreme Court specifically denied Schwab's appeal, permitting Crist to reschedule the execution. Schwab's final appeal to the Florida Supreme Court was denied because similar claims had already been declined by the Supreme Court.

Schwab was executed by lethal injection on July 1, 2008, and pronounced dead at 6:15 p.m. He declined to make a last statement.

== See also ==
- Capital punishment in Florida
- Capital punishment in the United States
- List of people executed in Florida
- List of people executed in the United States in 2008

Preceded by Robert Yarbrough	People executed in US	Succeeded by Carlton Turner
