= Pavón Prison =

Prison near Guatemala City

Coordinates: 14.5114°N 90.4400°W

Pavon Prison (Granja Penal de Pavón) is a prison in Guatemala. It is located outside the town of Fraijanes near Guatemala City. It is a part of the Dirección General del Sistema Penitenciario de Guatemala.

It was built in the late-1970s and over time it became overcrowded and authorities decided to only control the perimeters of the prison and let the prisoners run the interior on their own. Since 1996, a society developed, with cocaine operations run by Colombian drug lords incarcerated there.

== Authorities regain control ==
On Monday September 25, 2006, 3000 police officers and military forces overran the prison and reestablished authority. This led to the death of seven inmates. Among those killed was Luis Zepeda, a leader of the inmates and the head of the prison government.

== Capital punishment ==
Pavon Prison houses the Guatemalan death row and an execution chamber to carry out executions by lethal injection.

== Executed inmates ==
- Manuel Martínez Coronado: Mass murderer
- Amílcar Cetino Pérez and Tomás Cerrate Hernández: Convicted of kidnapping and murdering a businesswoman
