= Antonio Larrazábal =

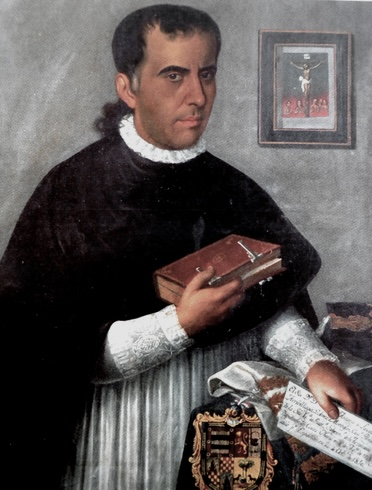

Rector of the Universidad de San Carlos de Guatemala
- In office 1820–1821

Personal details
- Born: José Antonio de Larrazábal y Arrivillaga; August 8, 1769 Guatemala City, Kingdom of Guatemala
- Died: December 2, 1853 (aged 84) Guatemala City, Guatemala
- Occupation: Diplomat, deputy, cleric

José Antonio de Larrazábal y Arrivillaga (August 8, 1769 - December 2, 1853) was a Guatemalan diplomat, deputy, and cleric who served as a deputy of the Cortes of Cádiz and later served as both the Rector and President of the University of San Carlos.

== Biography ==
Larrazábal was born in Antigua Guatemala, Kingdom of Guatemala to Simón de Larrazábal y Gálvez, a wealthy merchant and prominent viceregal administrator; and María Ana Arrivillaga y Montúfar, a member of the aristocratic Arrivillaga clan.

Larrazábal received a bachelor's degree at the Tridentine Seminary and graduated with a doctorate in theology, later being ordained as a priest in 1792. Larrazábal held many positions at the University of San Carlos and was eventually elected to the Cortes of Cádiz in 1810. Larrazábal, a staunch liberal, also notably proposed greater freedoms and rights for criollo, indigenous, and black peoples in New Spain. Larrazábal was imprisoned in 1814 following the abolition of the cortes by Ferdinand VII, he was eventually released on May 4, 1820 in Guatemala City. Following his release he was made rector of the University, continuing to play a role in national politics and society until his death on December 2, 1853.

== See also ==
- History of Guatemala
