= Romell Broom =

American murderer (1956–2020)

- Born: June 4, 1956; Muskegon, Michigan, U.S.
- Died: December 28, 2020 (aged 64); Columbus, Ohio, U.S.
- Status: Deceased
- Convictions: Aggravated murder; Kidnapping (2 counts); Attempted kidnapping (2 counts); Rape (2 counts); Aggravated robbery; Robbery
- Penalty: Death

Details
- Victims: Tryna Middleton
- Date: September 21, 1984
- Country: United States
- Location: East Cleveland, Ohio

Romell Broom (June 4, 1956 – December 28, 2020) was an American death row inmate who was convicted of murder, kidnapping and rape. He was sentenced to death for the 1984 murder of 14-year-old Tryna Middleton. Broom was scheduled to be executed on September 15, 2009, but after executioners failed to locate a vein, he was granted a reprieve. A second execution attempt was scheduled for June 2020, which was delayed until March 2022. Broom died from COVID-19 in prison before the sentence could be carried out.

== Early life ==
Broom was born in Muskegon, Michigan, and moved to Ohio with his mother when he was five years old.

== Crimes ==
Broom committed numerous non-violent crimes as a juvenile, for which he was repeatedly committed to the Ohio Youth Commission.

On October 25, 1974, Broom and another person entered a man's car, robbed him at gunpoint, and forced him out. On January 11, 1975, he raped a 12-year-old girl who was babysitting his niece. On March 15, 1975, he committed another armed robbery with an accomplice. Broom later pleaded guilty to rape, aggravated robbery, and robbery, and was sentenced to 7 to 25 years in prison. His codefendant in the robberies was acquitted. Broom was paroled on May 11, 1984.

Decades later, a woman named Vickie Varner claimed that Broom raped and threatened to kill her in 1975, when she was 13 years old.

On September 18, 1984, Broom attempted to abduct 12-year-old Venita McKenney, but was interrupted by two neighbors and fled. On September 21, 1984, Broom abducted, raped, and murdered 14-year-old Tryna Middleton as she was walking home with two of her friends from a football game in East Cleveland, Ohio.

On December 6, 1984, Broom physically assaulted and abducted 11-year-old Melinda Grissom. Grissom's younger sister witnessed the attack. After Broom threw Grissom into his car, her mother interrupted them and held onto the car while screaming for help. The icy road made it harder for Broom to drive, allowing Grissom's mother to hang on. Eventually, Grissom was able to escape; however, two young men were able to write the license plate number of the car. Broom was arrested later that day. He was charged with numerous crimes, including aggravated murder. Broom offered to plead guilty in exchange for a sentence of 30 years to life, but his offer was rejected. He was found guilty and sentenced to death.

In 2003, Broom accepted an offer from the state of Ohio for a DNA test to prove his innocence—however, the test results failed to exonerate him. The clemency hearing concluded that "the DNA report does not indicate an exact match ... Otherwise stated, eight or nine other black males in the country would have the same profile."

== Aborted execution ==
Broom was scheduled to be executed on September 15, 2009. However, the executioners tried for two hours to maintain an IV line through which they could inject the lethal drugs, before Ohio Governor Ted Strickland issued a one-week reprieve. His lawyers argued that his first execution attempt was cruel and unusual punishment, and that executing him would mean that his evidence would be "irretrievably lost" for their broader lawsuit challenging the constitutionality of Ohio's lethal injection procedure. U.S. District Court Judge Gregory L. Frost scheduled a November 30, 2009, hearing on the issues.

Amnesty International started a campaign to inform the public about the failure of the execution attempt.

There is also a documentary on this case, The Second Execution of Romell Broom by Michael Verhoeven, and Broom wrote his own story in the e-book Survivor on Death Row.

In March 2016, the Ohio Supreme Court rejected an appeal by Broom and ruled that the state could again try to execute him. In August 2016, Broom asked the Supreme Court of the United States to halt a second execution, with his lawyers arguing that another execution attempt would be cruel and unusual punishment and would violate double jeopardy protections under the 5th and 14th amendments to the U.S. constitution.

On December 12, 2016, the U.S. Supreme Court declined to give Broom a hearing on his appeal. On May 19, 2017, the Ohio Supreme Court scheduled an execution date for Broom, on June 17, 2020. On April 14, 2020, Broom's execution was delayed to March 16, 2022.

== Death ==
Broom died from suspected COVID-19 complications at Franklin Medical Center in Columbus, Ohio, on December 28, 2020, at age 64, during the COVID-19 pandemic in Ohio.

== See also ==
- Doyle Hamm
- Capital punishment in Ohio
- Execution of Clayton Lockett
- List of longest prison sentences served
- List of botched executions
