= John Tapner =

Person executed for murder

John Charles Tapner (8 March 1823 – 10 February 1854) was an English convicted murderer who was the last person executed by Guernsey.

Tapner was from Woolwich, London, England, and was living in St Martin when 74-year-old Elizabeth Saujon was murdered in her home in St Peter Port on 18 October 1853. Saujon had been knocked unconscious and left to die in her burning house.

Tapner was arrested and tried for the murder of Saujon. At trial, it was revealed that Tapner's mistress—who was his wife's sister—lived with Saujon. There were also reports of some of Saujon's belongings being discovered near Tapner's house in St Martin. While Tapner admitted to being in St Peter Port on the evening of the murder, he denied any involvement in the fire or Saujon's death. It was never clear what Tapner's motive would have been for killing Saujon and burning down her house.

Tapner was convicted of murder by the Jurats and sentenced to death by hanging. Victor Hugo (who would later move to Guernsey) and 600 residents petitioned the Home Secretary of the United Kingdom, Lord Palmerston, to commute Tapner's sentence. Lord Palmerston refused, and Tapner was hanged on 10 February 1854 in St Peter Port. His execution was performed by non-professionals, and Tapner died from strangulation.

No one was executed by Guernsey after Tapner's execution. Guernsey abolished the death penalty in 2003.

== See also ==
- List of botched executions

== General references ==
- Basil T. Rowswell (1906). Catalogue: Law and General Library of the Royal Court, Island of Guernsey (Royal Court), p. 163
- John Andrew Frey (1999). A Victor Hugo Encyclopedia (Westport: Conn.: Greenwood Press, ISBN 0-313-29896-3) s.v. "Tapner, execution of"
