= Amílcar Cetino Pérez and Tomás Cerrate Hernández =

Guatemalan murderers (died 2000)

Amilcar Cetino Pérez and Tomás Cerrate Hernández were two Guatemalan men convicted of murder. They were both executed on June 29, 2000, and their execution was televised on Guatemalan television. Cetino was 35 and Cerrate was 39. Both men were executed by lethal injection at Pavón Prison in Fraijanes. In January 1996, both men had kidnapped 80-year-old Isabel Bonifassi de Botran, who died as a result. Both perpetrators claimed to have been innocent.

Around the time of the execution President of Guatemala Alfonso Portillo sent his family to Canada to protect them from possible retaliation; the two perpetrators were members of a well-known kidnapping gang.

== See also ==
- Capital punishment in Guatemala

Other executions:

- Manuel Martínez Coronado
- Roberto Girón and Pedro Castillo
