= Capital punishment in Guatemala =

Capital punishment is a legal penalty in Guatemala, and is carried out by lethal injection and, to a lesser extent, the firing squad. The death penalty remains only in Guatemala's military codes of justice, and was abolished for civilian offences in October 2017.

Five executions had been carried out since 1983; all were broadcast live on television. The last executions took place on June 29, 2000, when kidnappers and murderers Amílcar Cetino Pérez and Tomás Cerrate Hernández were executed by lethal injection on live television.

From 2005 to 2012, the sentences of all 54 inmates condemned to death were commuted to life in prison. There are no inmates on death row in Guatemala as of 2018.

Guatemala voted in favor of the UN Moratorium on the Death Penalty in 2007, 2010, 2012, 2014, and 2016. The country abstained from voting in 2008.

In 2017, the Supreme Court of Justice of Guatemala banned capital punishment for civil crimes. It can only be applied in times of war. Guatemala is one of seven countries that has abolished capital punishment for ordinary crimes only.

Bernardo Arévalo, elected President of Guatemala in 2024, is against the death penalty. Alejandro Giammattei, president from 2020 to 2024, supports the death penalty. Jimmy Morales, president from 2015 to 2020, also voiced support for the death penalty.

== Executions since 1983 ==
	Executed person	Date of execution	Crime	Method	Under President
1	Pedro Castillo	September 13, 1996	Kidnapping, rape and murder of a 4-year-old girl	Firing squad	Álvaro Arzú
2	Roberto Girón	September 13, 1996	Kidnapping, rape and murder of a 4-year-old girl	Firing squad	Álvaro Arzú
3	Manuel Martínez Coronado	February 10, 1998	Murder of seven members of a single family	Lethal injection	Álvaro Arzú
4	Amílcar Cetino Pérez	June 29, 2000	Kidnapping and murder of businesswoman Isabel de Botra	Lethal injection	Alfonso Portillo
5	Tomás Cerrate Hernández	June 29, 2000	Kidnapping and murder of businesswoman Isabel de Botra	Lethal injection	Alfonso Portillo
