= Bennie Demps =

American convicted serial killer (1950–2000)

Bennie Eddie Demps
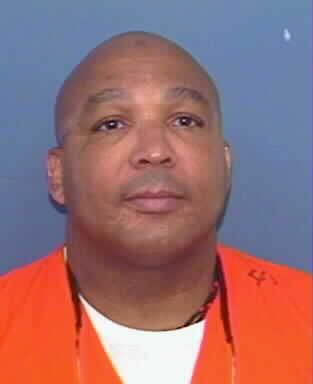
- Mugshot
- Born: June 17, 1950; Florida, U.S.
- Died: June 7, 2000 (aged 49); Florida State Prison, Florida, U.S.
- Status: Execution by lethal injection
- Convictions: First degree murder (x3); Aggravated assault
- Penalty: 1971; Death, commuted to 2 life sentences (consecutive); 1978; Death

Details
- Victims: 3
- Date: February 15, 1971 – September 7, 1976
- State: Florida
- Locations: Eustis and Florida State Prison
- Imprisoned at: Florida State Prison

Bennie Eddie Demps (June 17, 1950 – June 7, 2000) was an American serial killer and Vietnam War veteran convicted of three murders committed between 1971 and 1976. On February 15, 1971, Demps and 16-year-old accomplice Jackie Hardie shot and killed Robert Brinkworth and Celia Puhlick, and for this double murder, Demps and Hardie were sentenced to death, but in 1973, their death sentences were commuted to life imprisonment when the U.S. Supreme Court suspended the death penalty in a 1972 landmark ruling. Four years later, on September 7, 1976, Demps and two other prisoners stabbed and killed fellow inmate Alfred Sturgis at Florida State Prison. As the death penalty was reinstated in Florida just two months earlier, Demps was found guilty and sentenced to death a second time for this offence, while the other two prisoners, James Jackson and Harry Mungin, were given additional life sentences for the same case. Demps was executed by lethal injection on June 7, 2000.

== 1971 Eustis Car Trunk murders ==
On February 15, 1971, 20-year-old Bennie Eddie Demps, a Vietnam War veteran, held three people hostage. He shot them all, which killed two of them. The case became known as the "Eustis Car Trunk murders".

On that day, Demps and 16-year-old accomplice Jackie Hardie (January 21, 1954 – January 26, 1999) robbed an old man of his automobile, stole weapons and a safe from a private home in Mount Dora, and traveled to an orange grove near Eustis, Florida, where they struggled to open the safe. At the same time, 54-year-old real estate dealer Robert Brinkworth was showing a tract of land to an elderly Connecticut couple, Nicholas and Cecelia "Celia" Puhlick, who planned to find a house and plant oranges for retirement. The trio happened to encounter both Demps and Hardie trying to force the safe open while they walked around the area.

Demps and Hardie brandished their guns (an AK-47 and a handgun), held the trio at gunpoint, and forced them inside a car trunk, but not before shooting Celia in the stomach. After the victimes entered the trunk and they took several hundred dollars from them, Demps and Hardie fired multiple shots into the open trunk. Brinkworth and 64-year-old Celia died of multiple gunshot wounds, while 62-year-old Nicholas survived by playing dead despite a gunshot wound to his arm.

After murdering Brinkworth and Puhlick, Demps and Hardie fled to New Jersey. On February 18, 1971, the pair and an 18-year-old girl were arrested in New Jersey as fugitives wanted for the double murder. They were later extradited back to Florida to face charges for the Eustis Car Trunk murders. The girl, Hermenia Theresa Braxton, was later cleared of the murder charges and released after it was found she had an alibi of being at home based on witnesses' testimonies.

== First trial and sentencing ==
After their arrests, Demps and Hardie were charged with the murders of Puhlick and Brinkworth, and the attempted murder of Puhlick. The trial occurred on June 21, 1971, in circuit court in St. Augustine, after the venue was changed from Lake County due to the publicity. Demps offered a defence that he did not shoot the victims but rather walked off while Hardie carried out the shootings alone, while Hardie claimed he was under the influence of an older man in the course of the murders.

On July 2, 1971, the jury found Hardie and Demps guilty of both counts of murdering Puhlick and Brinkworth in the first degree. The offence of first-degree murder carried the death penalty. On the same date, both were sentenced to death for both counts of first-degree murder, in addition to 20 years each for attempted murder.

On February 28, 1973, the Florida Supreme Court upheld the convictions of Hardie and Demps, but they lowered the pair's death sentences to two consecutive life sentences, in accordance to the 1972 landmark ruling of Furman v. Georgia by the U.S. Supreme Court, which ruled that the death penalty was being arbitrarily applied in the United States.

Nearly 26 years after the commutation of his death sentence, Hardie died of unknown causes in prison on January 26, 1999.

== Murder of Alfred Sturgis ==
On September 7, 1976, four years after he was removed from death row, Bennie Demps committed a third murder, which ultimately led to his second and final death sentence.

Demps and fellow prisoners Harry Mungin (born July 20, 1949) and James Jackson (born November 27, 1952) attacked 23-year-old inmate Alfred Sturgis (January 12, 1953 – September 7, 1976) for allegedly being a snitch. Sturgis, who was serving a life sentence for both escape and second-degree murder charges, was reportedly being held down by both Demps and Mungin while Jackson used a home-made knife to stab him several times. At the time, Jackson was serving a jail term of six months to 15 years for robbery and firearm possession, while Mungin was serving 50 years' imprisonment for robbery.

Sturgis was found by correctional officers mortally wounded inside a cell. He was rushed to the prison hospital of Union Correctional Institution, and later transferred to the Reception and Medical Center (RMC). However, due to inadequate facilities at both institutions, Sturgis was transferred to the Shands Teaching Hospital in Gainesville. He died shortly after being admitted there. Before he died, Sturgis told a prison officer that Demps and Mungin restrained him while Jackson stabbed him. Larry Hathaway, another prisoner, testified that he saw the trio attacking and knifing Sturgis. Similarly, Sturgis's best friend Arthur Copeland, a former death row inmate serving life plus 50 years for the robbery-murder of a deaf-mute man, heard Sturgis name Jackson, Mungin and Demps as the people attacking him.

== Second trial and sentence ==
After their arrests, Demps, Mungin and Jackson were charged with the first-degree murder of Sturgis, and this was the second time Demps faced the death penalty, which was reinstated just two months before the killing upon the 1976 landmark ruling of Gregg v. Georgia.

The trial of Demps, who was tried together with Jackson and Mungin, was held in early 1978. During the trial, Larry Hathaway, the prisoner who witnessed the stabbing, was called as a witness, but the defence tried to impeach his credibility, arguing that Hathaway was a homosexual who concocted the testimony to frame the trio in exchange for a transfer to the prison where his lover, Robert Ziegler, was incarcerated. However, the court ruled against the defence and found it irrelevant for the trial.

On March 16, 1978, the jury found the trio guilty of first-degree murder. On the same date, the jury recommended life imprisonment for Mungin, and the death penalty for Demps and Jackson. Circuit Judge Wayne Carlisie scheduled formal sentencing for a later date.

On April 17, 1978, Demps was sentenced to death for the murder of Sturgis, marking his second death sentence. Jackson and Mungin were both sentenced to life imprisonment for their roles in the killing of Sturgis.

As of 2025, Mungin and Jackson are incarcerated at the Northwest Florida Reception Center and the Martin Correctional Institution respectively.

== Appeals ==
On January 8, 1981, the Florida Supreme Court dismissed Bennie Demps's appeal.

Demps's execution date was originally set for June 29, 1982. On June 8, 1982, Demps's appeal for a stay of execution was denied by Bradford County Circuit Judge Wayne Carlisie. On June 24, 1982, the Florida Supreme Court granted a stay of execution for Demps.

On December 20, 1984, the Florida Supreme Court rejected Demps's appeal and vacated the stay order.

On December 2, 1986, Demps's federal appeal was denied by the 11th Circuit Court of Appeals.

On October 6, 1987, Demps's appeal was denied by the U.S. Supreme Court.

Subsequently, a new death warrant was again signed for Demps, scheduling him to be executed on November 5, 1987. On November 4, 1987, the eve of Demps's scheduled execution, the Florida Supreme Court dismissed another appeal from Demps and refused to stay his execution. On that same day, the 11th Circuit Court of Appeals granted Demps's request to delay his execution.

On March 28, 1989, the 11th Circuit Court of Appeals dismissed Demps's appeal.

On June 13, 1989, another appeal from Demps was denied by the 11th Circuit Court of Appeals.

A year later, Demps was issued a new execution date of May 9, 1990, but two days before it was slated to proceed, Demps was again spared from execution after the Florida Supreme Court granted another stay of execution.

On April 9, 1998, Demps's appeal for a writ of habeas corpus was rejected by the Florida Supreme Court.

== Execution ==
On April 25, 2000, Florida Governor Jeb Bush signed a new death warrant for Bennie Demps, scheduling his sentence to be carried out on May 31, 2000. However, the date was rescheduled to June 7, 2000, ten days away from Demps's 50th birthday. As of June 2000, the month Demps was slated to be executed, he was among 370 inmates incarcerated on death row in Florida.

In a final attempt to evade execution, Demps filed last-minute appeals to delay his execution. Demps's first appeal was heard by Circuit Judge Robert Cates, but was denied on May 13, 2000. Demps further appealed to the Florida Supreme Court the court rejected the appeal on May 23, 2000. Demps filed another appeal to the Florida Supreme Court, and his lawyers requested for more time to file and prepare the appeal, but on June 1, 2000, the judge denied the request. Ultimately, the appeal was rejected on June 5, 2000.

On June 7, 2000, 49-year-old Bennie Eddie Demps was put to death by lethal injection at the Florida State Prison. This marked the state's third lethal injection execution since 1999. A few hours after Demps was executed, the state of Oklahoma executed Roger James Berget for the 1985 murder of a school teacher.

According to reports, while strapped to the gurney, Demps exclaimed to witnesses and his lawyer that he was being "butchered" by prison officers and accused them of cutting him in the leg and groin. Prison officials refuted Demps's allegations and stated there was no problem with the procedure as the executioners were only trying to find a suitable vein, but the delay led to the execution taking less than an hour to be finally carried out, and Demps was pronounced dead at 6:53pm. Demps's last words were reportedly, "This is not an execution, this is murder. I am an innocent man."

The execution of Demps was considered as one of Florida's notable botched executions, due to the technicians failing to find suitable veins for the IV drips and took more than 30 minutes to insert the IVs and conduct the execution.

== See also ==
- List of botched executions
- Capital punishment in Florida
- List of people executed in Florida
- List of people executed in the United States in 2000
- List of serial killers in the United States
