= Marco Antonio Villeda Sandoval =

Guatemalan politician

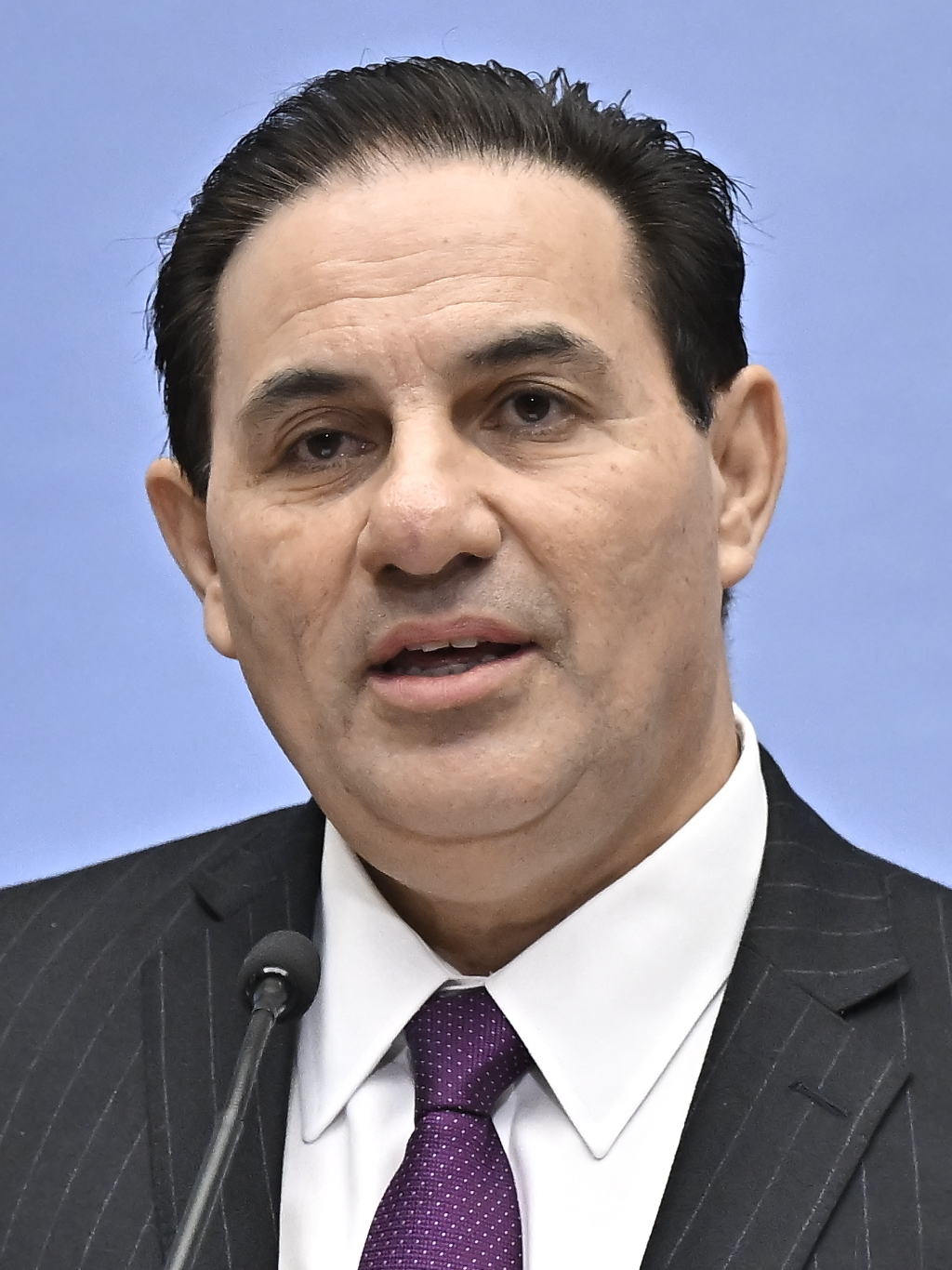

Minister of the Interior
- Incumbent
- Assumed office 24 October 2025
- President: Bernardo Arévalo
- Preceded by: Francisco Jiménez Irungaray

Personal details
- Occupation: Politician

Marco Antonio Villeda Sandoval is a Guatemala official, serving as the Minister of Interior.
