= Alonso de Arrivillaga =

Jesuit missionary in New Spain

Alonso de Arrivillaga y Coronado (August 7, 1648 - 1724) was a Guatemalan missionary and benefactor of the Society of Jesus (Jesuits) who worked in Sonora, New Spain.

== Biography ==
Arrivillaga was born August 7, 1648, in Santiago de Guatemala; his father was Domingo de Arrivillaga y Urdinsso.

Arrivillaga served as procurator of the Jesuit missions in New Spain from 1714 to 1715.

In 1715, Arrivillaga was appointed provincial superior, and promulgated a set of twenty-one regulations for the missionaries. Arrivillaga ordered them to limit their chocolate consumption and travel expenses; to shut the door on anyone attempting to discredit the Jesuits; and to require no more than three days a week of labor from the natives outside of harvest time.
