= Half-hanging =

Torture method

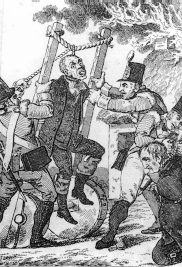
Half-hanging of United Irishmen by government forces in 1798.

Half-hanging is a method of torture in which the victim is non-lethally hanged. The victim may be strangled to the point of unconsciousness, in which case they are revived.

== Torture method ==
The term has been applied to the first part of the medieval British capital punishment of being hanged, drawn and quartered. After the Stuart Restoration in 1660, the 17th century newspaper Mercurius Publicus described the punishment of regicide Thomas Scot "who last year publickly boasted that he was one of those that adjudg'd his late MAJESTY to death":

he was half-hang’d, cut down, his Members cut off and burnt in his sight, his quarters were convey'd back upon the Hurdle that brought him to be dispos'd so far asunder, that they'll scarce ever meet in one Tomb.

During the Irish Rebellion of 1798 against British rule in Ireland, government forces, in particular the militia and yeomanry, frequently used half-hanging against suspected rebels. A prominent victim of half-hanging was Anne Devlin, the housekeeper of rebel leader Robert Emmet.

Half-hanging was also used against slaves in the United States, for example in Richmond, Virginia. In his 1849 narrative, Henry Box Brown recounts how, in the aftermath of Nat Turner's Rebellion, many slaves "found away from their quarters after dark...were suspended to some limb of a tree, with a rope about their necks, so adjusted as not to quite strangle them, and then they were pelted by the men and boys with rotten eggs."

== Other applications ==
In his 1728 pamphlet entitled Augusta Triumphans, Daniel Defoe uses the term to refer to erotic asphyxiation. He describes various forms of paraphilia being practised in London's Drury Lane area (the "hundreds of Drury"):

many old lechers, beasts as they are! steal from their families, and seek these harlots' lurking holes, to practise their unaccountable schemes of new invented lewdnesses; some half hang themselves, others are whipped, some lie under a table and gnaw the bones that are thrown them, while others stand slaving among a parcel of drabs at a washing tub. Strange that the inclination should not die with the power, but that old fools should make themselves the prey and ridicule of a pack of strumpets!

== See also ==
- Hanging
- Waterboarding
- John Smith (housebreaker), who earned the nickname Half-hanged Smith after surviving a sentence of hanging
