= Roberto Girón and Pedro Castillo =

Guatemalan murderers (died 1996)

Roberto Girón Mendoza, 49, and Pedro Castillo, 39, were two Guatemalan men convicted of murder and executed, with their deaths by firing squad occurring on 13 September 1996. It was the first official firing squad execution in Guatemala since 1983. It was also the first execution to occur in Latin America, with the exception of Guyana and the Caribbean, in a span of over ten years.

The executions occurred outside of the Canada Penal Farm (Granja de Canadá), in Escuintla, Guatemala. The men had raped and murdered four-year-old Sonia Marisol Álvarez García on 19 April 1993, for which they were convicted of aggravated murder and aggravated rape. The execution was broadcast on live television.

The men survived the initial volleys of bullets, so after a doctor had confirmed they were alive, a squad leader killed each man by firing a bullet into their heads. The resulting controversy caused the Guatemalan legislature to change the method of execution to lethal injection.

Their executions were filmed by the press and featured in the 1998 shockumentary film, Banned from Television.

== See also ==
- Capital punishment in Guatemala

Other executions:

- Manuel Martínez Coronado
- Amílcar Cetino Pérez and Tomás Cerrate Hernández
