= Doyle Hamm =

American convicted murderer and botched execution survivor

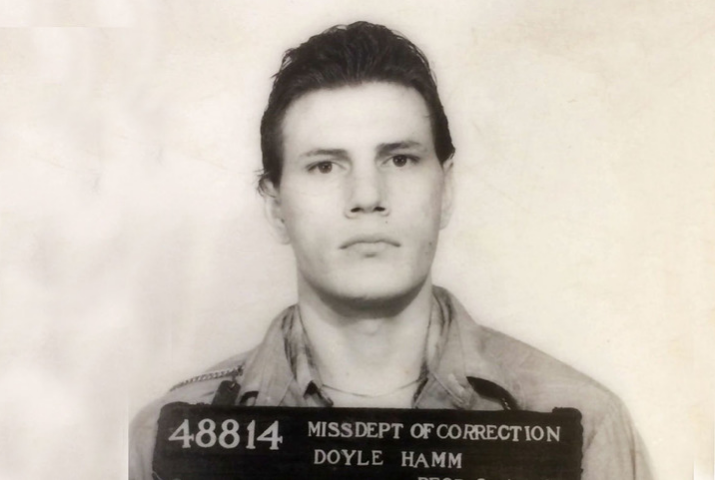
- Hamm in 1981
- Born: Doyle Lee Hamm; February 14, 1957; Alabama, U.S.
- Died: November 28, 2021 (aged 64); Holman Correctional Facility, Atmore, Alabama, U.S.
- Cause of death: Lymphatic cancer
- Status: Deceased
- Conviction: Capital murder
- Penalty: Death (1987)

Details
- Killed: Patrick Cunningham
- Weapon: .38 caliber pistol

Doyle Lee Hamm (February 14, 1957 – November 28, 2021) was an American death row inmate in Alabama, who was convicted and sentenced to death for the 1987 murder of Patrick Cunningham, whom he killed while committing a robbery. While on death row, Hamm developed lymphatic cancer, which made it difficult to impossible to achieve the venous access necessary to administer the drugs used in lethal injections. Despite months of warning by Hamm's attorney and human rights observers and a decades' long legal battle, the Alabama Department of Corrections attempted to execute Hamm on February 22, 2018. The unsuccessful execution attempt lasted nearly three hours and drew international attention. In March 2018, Hamm and the state of Alabama reached a confidential settlement, the terms of which precluded a second execution attempt, giving Hamm a de facto sentence of life in prison without the possibility of parole, although his sentence was not formally commuted. Hamm remained in prison until his death from cancer-related complications in 2021.

== Early life ==
Hamm was born on February 14, 1957, and grew up in northwest Alabama, the tenth of twelve children. While he was growing up, Hamm's father and each of his six older brothers spent time in jail. In an interview, one of Hamm's sisters described their childhood home as “constant hell all the time” and recalled that her father told his children that “If you don't go out and steal, then you're not a Hamm.” From an early age, Hamm struggled in school. Tests and report cards indicated that, in the fifth grade, Hamm was still reading at a first-grade level. Hamm dropped out of school during the ninth grade and began abusing drugs and alcohol.

At the age of twenty, Hamm was arrested and charged with robbery after a drunken fight in a bar parking lot. Hamm entered a guilty plea and was sentenced to five years in prison. Years later, the alleged victim confessed that no robbery had ever taken place and Hamm's court-appointed attorney admitted that he had been “too busy and overworked to give this case the time and attention it needed.” Hamm was arrested other times for burglary, assault, and grand larceny.

== Murder of Patrick Cunningham ==
On January 24, 1987, Hamm went on a crime spree that culminated in a motel robbery at the Anderson Motel in Cullman, Alabama, and the murder of Patrick Cunningham, a nighttime clerk at the motel. Three hundred and fifty dollars were taken from the motel's cash register (equivalent to $992 in 2025) as well as $60 from Cunningham’s wallet (equivalent to $170 in 2025). Cunningham was shot once in the temple with a .38 caliber pistol that had been stolen in a robbery committed by Hamm in Mississippi earlier the same day. On the following day, January 25, 1987 Hamm was arrested in Cullman and charged with capital murder.

Two individuals claiming to be witnesses to the crime initially identified Hamm as the gunman during the robbery, but soon recanted their testimony. Those individuals were later charged as co-defendants and took deals to testify as state witnesses. During questioning, Hamm confessed to committing the robbery.

== Problems at trial and on appeal ==
=== Problems at trial ===
Hamm's 1987 trial was divided into two parts: a first stage during which a jury would determine whether Hamm was guilty and, if it found him guilty, a second phase during which the jury would determine whether life imprisonment or a death sentence was the appropriate punishment. During the second phase of the trial, defense attorneys are able to present mitigating evidence to the jury, in order to argue that the defendant should be sentenced to life imprisonment instead of death.

Hamm's defense attorney spent only 19 minutes presenting mitigation evidence. None of the medical and education records indicating that Hamm may have had brain damage or an intellectual disability were presented to the jury, even though the records were available. Additionally, evidence that Hamm suffered from fetal alcohol syndrome and that he had an IQ of only 64 to 73 was not presented to the jury. The defense counsel's failure to present this evidence to the jury became the subject of subsequent appeals, which raised the possibility that Hamm's attorney was so ineffective as to violate the Sixth Amendment.

=== Problems on appeal and in post-conviction proceedings ===
In June 1999, twelve years after Hamm's conviction, Hamm received a hearing to review claims that his trial counsel was ineffective and that Hamm's constitutional right to counsel was violated as a result. On Friday December 3, the Alabama Attorney General's office submitted a “Proposed Memorandum Order” to the judge who was presiding over the case. The following Monday, less than a single business day after the proposed order had been submitted, the judge entered the proposed order as his ruling, without changing a single word or even striking out the word “proposed.” The Brennan Center for Justice noted that it isn't clear from the record whether the judge who presided over Hamm's 1999 hearing “ever bothered to read the order.”

In 2015, when the Eleventh Circuit Court of Appeals was reviewing Hamm's case, the court included a footnote stating that “we take this opportunity to once again strongly criticize the practice of trial courts’ uncritical wholesale adoption of the proposed orders or opinions submitted by a prevailing party.” Judge Adalberto Jordan of the Eleventh Circuit stated “I don't believe for a second that that judge went through 89 pages in a day and then filed that as his own. As if he had gone through everything, went through his notes, the transcript, the exhibits, and the like. It just can't be done! It just can't be done.” Judge Jordan added that “isn't there something fishy about such a detailed opinion being signed on a Monday after being submitted the previous Friday?”

Another problem with the 1999 hearing occurred as a result of a change in counsel. Over the objection of Hamm and Bernard Harcourt, a law professor who was then representing Hamm pro bono, the court terminated Harcourt's representation of Hamm and appointed a new attorney to represent him during the proceedings. The new counsel, who was unfamiliar with the work that Hamm's previous attorney had been doing, called only a single witness during the trial. The court-appointed attorney did not call the expert psychologist or the mitigation psychologist, both of whom were prepared to testify about Hamm's brain damage.

These problems with Hamm's 1987 trial and 1999 hearing were significant enough to warrant a group of former judges and state bar association presidents to petition the U.S. Supreme Court to grant legal relief to Hamm. The group of former judges included a former Chief Justice of the Alabama Supreme Court, a former Associate Justice of the Alabama Supreme Court, a former Presiding Judge of the Alabama Court of Criminal Appeals, and two former presidents of the Alabama State Bar.

== Illness ==
In February 2014, Hamm, who was still on death row, was diagnosed with lymphatic and cranial cancer. Doctors discovered a large malignant tumor behind his left eye and determined that Hamm suffered from B-cell lymphoma. Doctors also discovered “numerous abnormal lymph nodes” in Hamm's abdomen, lungs, and chest.

Hamm underwent years of cancer treatment, including radiation therapy, but the treatments did not eliminate the cancer entirely and, by late 2017, Hamm's cancer had worsened. By late 2017, Hamm was suffering from inflamed lymph nodes in his neck, chest, and abdomen, symptoms which are associated with worsening lymphoma. Hamm's swollen lymph nodes were observed by multiple independent medical examiners. A surgery to remove a cancerous lesion on Hamm's cheek that was eating through bone and tissue was canceled on December 13, 2017, the date it was scheduled to be performed, when the Alabama Supreme Court handed down Hamm's death warrant and scheduled an execution for a few months later.

In September 2017, when an anesthesiologist came to visit Hamm for a medical examination, he was prohibited from bringing his medical equipment past the prison security and the doctor was forced to use Hamm's lawyer's necktie as a tourniquet. Andrew Cohen, a fellow at the Brennan Center for Justice noted that Hamm's case symbolizes the injustice of Alabama's death penalty system. Cohen observed that “the idea that executioners want to make sure they kill Hamm before he dies of cancer, the fact that it is likely the lethal injection itself will cause him "needless pain" before he dies, may be abhorrent but it's entirely consistent with the way state officials have handled Hamm's case for years.”

In addition to cancer, Hamm suffered from Hepatitis C and had a history of intravenous drug use that made it more difficult to access his veins.

== Lead up to execution ==
On December 13, 2017, the Alabama Supreme Court set Hamm’s execution date for Thursday, February 22, 2018.

On January 31, 2018, Chief Judge Karen O. Bowdre issued a stay of execution, finding that Hamm had shown a substantial likelihood that he would suffer irreparable injury if the execution were to go forward. In an order released on February 6, Chief Judge Bowdre ordered an independent medical examination of Hamm, finding that a medical examination was necessary in order to determine whether “Alabama's lethal injection protocol "presents a risk that is sure or very likely to cause serious illness and needless suffering, and give rise to sufficiently imminent dangers.

Alabama appealed the district court’s order and, on February 13, the 11th Circuit Court of Appeals vacated the stay and ordered the district court to immediately appoint an independent medical examiner and schedule an independent medical examination. The medical examination found that Hamm’s arms and hands were unusable, but his “lower extremities” were usable.

== Calls for clemency ==
In the weeks leading up to Hamm's execution, human rights experts from the United Nations called on Alabama to halt Hamm's execution. The Special Rapporteurs expressed concern that the execution could amount to cruel, inhumane or degrading treatment or punishment, and possibly torture. The Special Rapporteurs also expressed concern that Hamm did not receive a fair trial.

Sister Helen Prejean, an anti-death penalty advocate, frequently spoke out about Hamm's execution and expressed concern that the execution would “go horribly wrong." Prejean described Alabama's decision to execute Hamm despite his cancer as “especially inhumane.” On February 20, two days before Hamm's execution was scheduled to take place, former New Mexico Governor Bill Richardson and the International Commission Against the Death Penalty authored an open letter to Alabama Governor Kay Ivey expressing serious concern over Hamm's scheduled execution. On February 6, Hamm's attorney petitioned Governor Ivey to grant Hamm clemency. Included in Hamm's clemency petition were letters of support from family and friends, faith leaders, and community members. The Human Rights Center of the Pontifical Catholic University of Rio de Janeiro also wrote a letter in support of clemency.

On February 21, the day prior to Hamm's scheduled execution, a group of lawyers and former judges wrote a letter to Governor Ivey, urging her not to go ahead with Hamm's execution. The group, which included former Alabama Supreme Court Justice Ernest “Sonny” Hornsby, former Court of Criminal Appeals Judge William Bowen, and two former presidents of the Alabama State Bar, warned “the prospect of the prolonged, agonizing execution of a very sick cancer patient cannot be a desirable one for anyone in our State, even those who support retention of the death penalty in general. The jurists raised the prospect that Hamm’s impending execution could turn out to be like the botched execution of Clayton Lockett, which would draw “grotesque international attention” to Alabama and its execution practices.

== Attempted execution ==
On February 20, two days before Hamm's execution was scheduled to take place, Chief Judge Bowdre issued an order allowing the execution to take place. At 12:30 p.m. on February 22, the Eleventh Circuit Court of Appeals denied Hamm's request for a stay of execution, prompting Hamm's counsel to appeal the decision to the United States Supreme Court.

At 6:00 p.m. on February 22, the Supreme Court issued a temporary stay of execution as it considered Hamm's claims. Almost three hours later, at approximately 8:40 p.m., the Supreme Court lifted the temporary stay and denied Hamm's petition for a stay of execution. Justices Ginsburg and Sotomayor dissented from the court's denial and noted that the method of execution that Alabama had devised in order to execute Hamm despite his cancer and venous access issues had "never been tried before in Alabama."

During the course of the execution attempt, correctional officers spent two and a half hours inserting needles into Hamm's legs and ankles, trying to get venous access. The execution team turned Hamm on his stomach and slapped the back of his legs in an attempt to find a usable vein. When attempts at peripheral venous access failed, members of the execution team began inserting needles into Hamm's groin in the hopes of finding a vein. During this process, Hamm was stabbed a half-dozen times, with needles puncturing his bladder and penetrating his femoral artery. In the days following the execution attempt, Hamm's urine contained blood as a result of the punctured bladder. During the execution, a large amount of blood accumulated around Hamm's groin, soaking through the pad he was lying on and requiring the execution team to replace it. The large amount of blood led to speculation that the executioner had also punctured Hamm's femoral artery.

When the execution was finally called off, Hamm collapsed as he was removed from the gurney. During a visit with his defense counsel the following day, Hamm was limping and sore and was described by his attorney as “a shadow of himself.” Hamm became the fourth person in the United States since 1946 to walk out of the execution chamber still alive. In a press conference following the execution attempt, Jeff Dunn, Commissioner of the Alabama Department of Corrections, told reporters: "I wouldn’t necessarily characterize what we had tonight as a problem."

The New York Times described the botched execution as "ghoulish proceedings." Sara Totonchi, executive director of the Southern Center for Human Rights described the event as "unconscionable," adding that the "attempted execution clearly demonstrates the cruelty and the torture of the death penalty." The editorial board of a local newspaper in Alabama described the attempted execution as "torture in Alabama's death chamber." In a report submitted to the federal court, the doctor who examined Hamm after the attempted execution wrote that, during the execution, Hamm wished for death "because he preferred to die rather than to continue to experience the ongoing severe pain."

== Aftermath ==
On March 5, 2018, Hamm and his attorney filed an amended civil rights lawsuit against the Alabama Department of Corrections. The lawsuit alleged that a second execution attempt would violate Hamm's Fifth, Eighth, and Fourteenth Amendment rights. Hamm also alleged that a second execution attempt would violate 42 U.S.C. § 1983, a federal law prohibiting the deprivation of civil rights. In the immediate aftermath of the execution attempt, the Alabama Attorney General's Office would not comment on whether it would seek a second execution attempt.

On March 26, 2018, a little over a month after the attempted execution, Hamm and the state of Alabama reached a confidential settlement. The settlement “resolved all of the state and federal litigation” that was still pending in the case at the time and ended the efforts by Alabama to set a second execution date for Hamm, thus de facto reducing his sentence to life imprisonment without parole.

In a press conference announcing that Oklahoma would move forward with executions by inert gas inhalation, Joe Allbaugh, the Director of the Oklahoma Department of Corrections, described the attempt to execute Hamm as "inhumane."

Following Hamm's attempted execution, the Associated Press and other news outlets requested the state's execution protocol and related records. The state initially denied the request, claiming that the execution protocol was secret. A district court ordered that that state could not keep its protocol secret and had to disclose the requested records. In March 2019, a three-judge panel of the Eleventh Circuit Court of Appeals upheld the district court's ruling. The Eleventh Circuit wrote that “The fact that Alabama zealously guards information about a matter of great public concern does not tip the scales against disclosure. The court concludes that the considerations in favor of unsealing the records greatly outweigh Alabama’s interest in maintaining secrecy.”

The events surrounding Alabama's attempt to execute Hamm were recounted in a Supreme Court brief that was filed in Bucklew v. Precythe, a 2019 Supreme Court case concerning the death penalty. The brief was filed on behalf of former federal and state judges, prosecutors, and law enforcement officials, who were urging the Supreme Court to prohibit the execution of Russell Bucklew. Bucklew was ultimately executed in October 2019.

Hamm died in prison of cancer-related complications on November 28, 2021, at the age of 64.

== See also ==
- Romell Broom
- Capital punishment in Alabama
- List of botched executions
