= Ángel Nieves Díaz =

Puerto Rican convict executed by lethal injection (1951–2006)

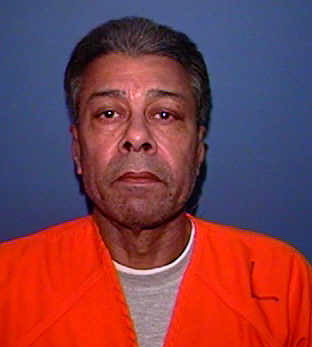
- Born: August 31, 1951; Puerto Rico
- Died: December 13, 2006 (aged 55); Florida State Prison, Florida, U.S.
- Other names: Ángel Díaz; Papo la Muerte; Emilio Baez; Alfredo Díaz; José Díaz; Ángel Dieque; Papo Guadalupe; Alfredo Guadalupe-Díaz
- Status: Executed by lethal injection
- Convictions: Puerto Rico; Second degree murder Armed robbery Connecticut; Second degree kidnapping Illegal possession of a handgun Florida; First degree murder Kidnapping (4 counts); Armed robbery (2 counts); Attempted armed robbery Threatening to use a firearm
- Penalty: Puerto Rico; 15 to 23 years imprisonment Connecticut; 7 years imprisonment Florida; Death

Details
- Victims: 2–3
- Country: United States
- States: Puerto Rico and Florida

Ángel Nieves Díaz (August 31, 1951 – December 13, 2006) was a Puerto Rican murderer who was executed by lethal injection by Florida. Díaz, who had escaped from a prison in Puerto Rico while serving time for murder, was convicted of shooting and killing the manager of a strip club in Florida in 1979. He maintained his innocence until his death.

== Early life ==
Ángel Nieves Díaz was born in Puerto Rico on August 31, 1951. In high school, he participated in Cursillo and married before he dropped out in his third year. At age 17, he was arrested for possessing heroin. When Díaz was 24, he shot and wounded a police officer during an armed robbery. He was sentenced to 5 to 8 years in prison.

Díaz was a suspected leader of the Boricua Popular Army, also known as Los Macheteros. He was known by the nickname Papá de la Muerte, or Papo la Muerte, which roughly translates to "Daddy of Death".

== Crimes ==
In July 1978, Díaz killed the director of a drug rehabilitation center, stabbing him 19 times while he was sleeping. He was found guilty of second degree murder and sentenced to 10 to 15 years in prison. In 1979, Díaz escaped from the Río Piedras State Penitentiary, nearly beating a guard to death in the process. He fled to Florida.

On December 29, 1979, Díaz and two friends, Angel "Sammy" Toro and a man named "Willie", who was never caught, robbed the Velvet Swing Lounge, a strip club in Little Gables, Florida. During the robbery, 49-year-old Joseph Nagy, the manager, was shot to death. There were no eyewitnesses because most employees and patrons were locked in a public restroom.

Police also suspect Díaz and Toro of committing another murder in Miami's Flagami neighborhood.

=== Arrest and imprisonment ===
In February 1981, Díaz was arrested on unrelated assault and firearms charges. He gave authorities a fake name, Emilio Baez, and posted bail. Before police discovered his identity, Díaz jumped bail and fled north to Connecticut. He was later arrested on federal firearm charges in Middletown, Connecticut. While awaiting trial, Díaz was sent to Hartford Correctional Center. In August 1981, he and three other inmates escaped by holding one guard at knifepoint and beating another guard. He was convicted in federal court of illegally possessing a firearm and second degree kidnapping in state court. Díaz was also convicted of a state firearm charge, after officials found a loaded 38-caliber Derringer revolver in his cell. His federal conviction was later overturned under a now closed loophole due to Puerto Rico not being a state.

Díaz and Toro, the latter now serving life without parole for murdering a woman in Massachusetts, were charged with killing Nagy in 1983, after Díaz's girlfriend at the time told police that Díaz was involved. Police found Díaz's fingerprint on a matchbook left at the scene. In 1986, Diaz was found guilty of first degree murder. During his trial, he threatened witnesses, fired his lawyer, and chose to represent himself. Diaz claimed that Toro had committed the murder. The jury sentenced him to death by an 8–4 vote.

The testimony of a fellow inmate of Dade County, Ralph Gajus, who was serving a 20-year sentence for second degree murder, was also crucial in Díaz' conviction and sentence. In 1984, Gajus testified that Díaz had confessed in his cell that he had shot Nagy. Although Díaz spoke English poorly and Gajus understood no Spanish, the two communicated with hand signals. Díaz's eventual conviction was in fact largely dependent on cellmate Gajus' testimony.

Toro pleaded guilty to second degree murder and received a life sentence.

== Execution ==
Several pleas for clemency were made for Díaz, including by President of the Senate of Puerto Rico Kenneth McClintock. In 2006, Díaz's last appeal was denied. As the date of the execution came closer, the case was again brought to the public attention. On November 28, 2006, the Governor of Puerto Rico, Aníbal Acevedo Vilá, asked the Governor of Florida, Jeb Bush, for clemency in the case. Governor Vilá voiced concerns about the fairness of Díaz's trial, the recanted testimony of Gajus, and Toro's life sentence.

On December 13, 2006, Díaz was put to death by lethal injection at the Florida State Prison near Raiford. He never ordered a last meal, but was served a prison menu of shredded turkey with taco seasoning, shredded cheese, rice, pinto beans, tortilla shells, apple crisp, and iced tea, which he turned down. His final statement, translated from Spanish, was: "The state of Florida is killing an innocent person. The state of Florida is committing a crime because I am innocent. The death penalty is not only a form of vengeance, but also a cowardly act by humans. I'm sorry for what is happening to me and my family who have been put through this." A great amount of controversy surrounded the execution because, contrary to the usual practices, Díaz needed an additional dose of drugs to be executed. The process took approximately 34 minutes as opposed to the usual 7.5 minutes. The family declared the procedure a botched execution.

Gretl Plessinger, spokeswoman for the Florida Department of Corrections, said that Nieves Díaz did not feel any pain and that a liver condition was the cause of the delay, but the family then denied that Nieves Díaz suffered any such condition. A further investigation concluded that there was negligence in the placement of the needles in Nieves Díaz's arms, whereby the needle would have penetrated entirely through the vein, denying the drugs direct entry into the bloodstream and thereby preventing the drugs from directly reaching desired target sites such as the brain and diaphragm. Rather, the drugs were injected into soft tissue after the needle entered and immediately exited the vein, thereby greatly lengthening the time before death. As a result of this, then governor Jeb Bush postponed all pending executions until further notice. However, on July 18, 2007, the new governor, Charlie Crist, lifted the ban by signing a death warrant, authorizing the execution of Mark Dean Schwab.

In 2014, The New Republic published photographs of the botched execution, showing discoloration on the prisoner's arms.

== Aftermath ==
Díaz's body was repatriated to Puerto Rico, where he was buried in Río Piedras. A candlelight vigil was held in Old San Juan by opponents of the death penalty.

In 2004, Toro's other murder conviction was vacated, making him eligible for parole. He was paroled on November 18, 2008.

== See also ==
- Capital punishment in Florida
- Capital punishment in the United States
- List of people executed in Florida
- List of people executed in the United States in 2006

Botched executions:

- Clayton Lockett
- Doyle Hamm

Executions carried out in Florida
Preceded by Danny Rolling October 25, 2006	Ángel Nieves Díaz; December 13, 2006	Succeeded by Mark Dean Schwab July 1, 2008
Executions carried out in the United States
Preceded by John Yancey Schmitt – Virginia November 9, 2006	Ángel Nieves Díaz – Florida; December 13, 2006	Succeeded by Corey Duane Hamilton – Oklahoma January 9, 2007
