= William Duell (criminal) =

English criminal

- Born: 1724
- Died: 1805 (aged 80–81); Boston, Massachusetts, United States
- Status: Transported
- Convictions: Murder; Rape; Robbery
- Penalty: Hanging (later changed); Transportation

William Duell (1724-1805) was a 16-year-old boy who, along with five others, gang raped Sarah Griffin, who later died from her injuries, during a robbery in Acton, London, England.

On 24 November 1740, he was hanged in Tyburn, along with four others, but survived the hanging. His sentence was commuted to transportation to America, where he died at an advanced age following the revolution.

== Hanging and revival ==
Duell's body hanged for about 20 minutes before being cut down. It was then brought to the Anatomy Theatre at the Worshipful Company of Barbers and Surgeons to be anatomised for medical training.

Duell was stripped and laid on the board, about to be dissected. However, one of the servants noticed that he had begun breathing slowly. Duell's breath got quicker and quicker; he was then bled, and in two hours, he was able to sit upright. That night, he was taken back to prison in Newgate. Duell, suffering from a fever and delirium during his trial and execution, had no recollection of the hanging.

It was suggested that his bad state was what ultimately saved his life. By the following day, he was back to full health. Meanwhile, the public had apparently found out what happened to Duell, and there was great excitement over his case. The authorities decided to change his sentence to penal transportation. He was exiled for life to North America. He lived the rest of his life in Boston and was reported to have died sometime in 1805.

== See also ==
- Gallows
- John Smith (housebreaker)
