= National Civil Police (Guatemala) =

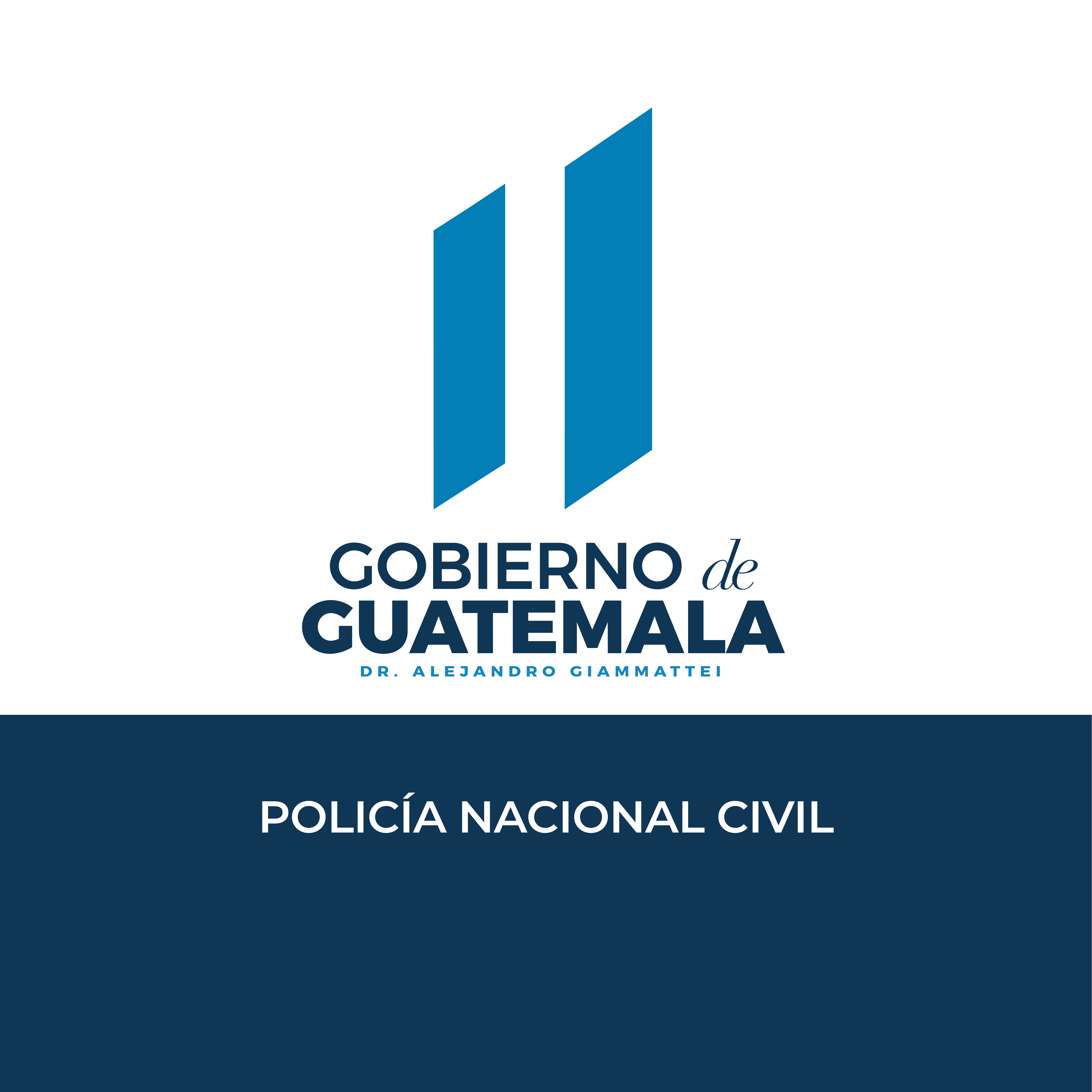
- Logo used by the National Civil Police from 2020 to 2024.
- Abbreviation: PNC

Agency overview
- Formed: 17 July 1997; 29 years ago
- Employees: 42,000 (2024)

Jurisdictional structure
- Operations jurisdiction: Guatemala
- Governing body: Ministry of the Interior

Operational structure
- Minister responsible: Francisco Jiménez Irungaray
- Agency executive: David Estuardo Custodio Boteo, Director-General

Website
- pnc.gob.gt

The National Civil Police (Spanish: Policía Nacional Civil, PNC) is the police force of Guatemala and is an agency of the Guatemalan Ministry of the Interior. The PNC is in charge of protecting public order and guaranteeing the exercise of rights and freedoms of Guatemalans. With about 42,000 officers, Guatemala's PNC is the largest police force in Central America.

== History ==
PNC officers in 2024

Upon the signing of the Peace Accords to end the Guatemalan Civil War in 1996, the Policía Nacional Civil (PNC) was created by merging the former National Police and Treasury Guard. On 17 July 1997, the first 1,232 PNC officers began their service, starting at three police stations in areas with known high crime rates. Immediately, the force was expanded across all departments of Guatemala, and by August 1999 (just two years later), the PNC managed to cover all 22 departments. As of that year, there were a total of 13,050 PNC officers, which included 3,805 former National Police and 733 former Treasury Guard agents. New officers were trained by the Academy of the National Civil Police, opened in 1998.

Currently, six district headquarters, twenty-seven police stations, one hundred and twenty-seven stations, and 343 substations have been deployed across Guatemala. Eight mobile units may also be deployed in Guatemala City to violent areas to control crime.

The PNC training was coordinated by the European Union (EU), which developed the "Program of Support for the National Security Policy" through the Spanish Civil Guard (GCE) in 1997. In terms of criminal investigation, the PNC received support from ICITAP (International Criminal Investigative Training Assistance Program of the U.S. Department of Justice), and instruction and training in human rights were in charge of the strengthening program of the MINUGUA PNC.

In 2006, a police force called GPC (Civil Protection Guard) was created, the function of which was to protect citizens and ensure public order in areas of high criminal risk. It serves as support to the National Civil Police in those tasks.

In response to pressure from the Mexican government in 2019, the PNC has been called upon to stymy the progression of Central American migrant caravans approaching the Mexico to the North before they can reach the border. The PNC also has played an important part around election season ensuring fair and safe democratic experiences for Guatemalan voters across the country. Between June and July 2019, DISETUR and DIPRONA members underwent trainings in basic trauma management with LFR International.

== Organization ==
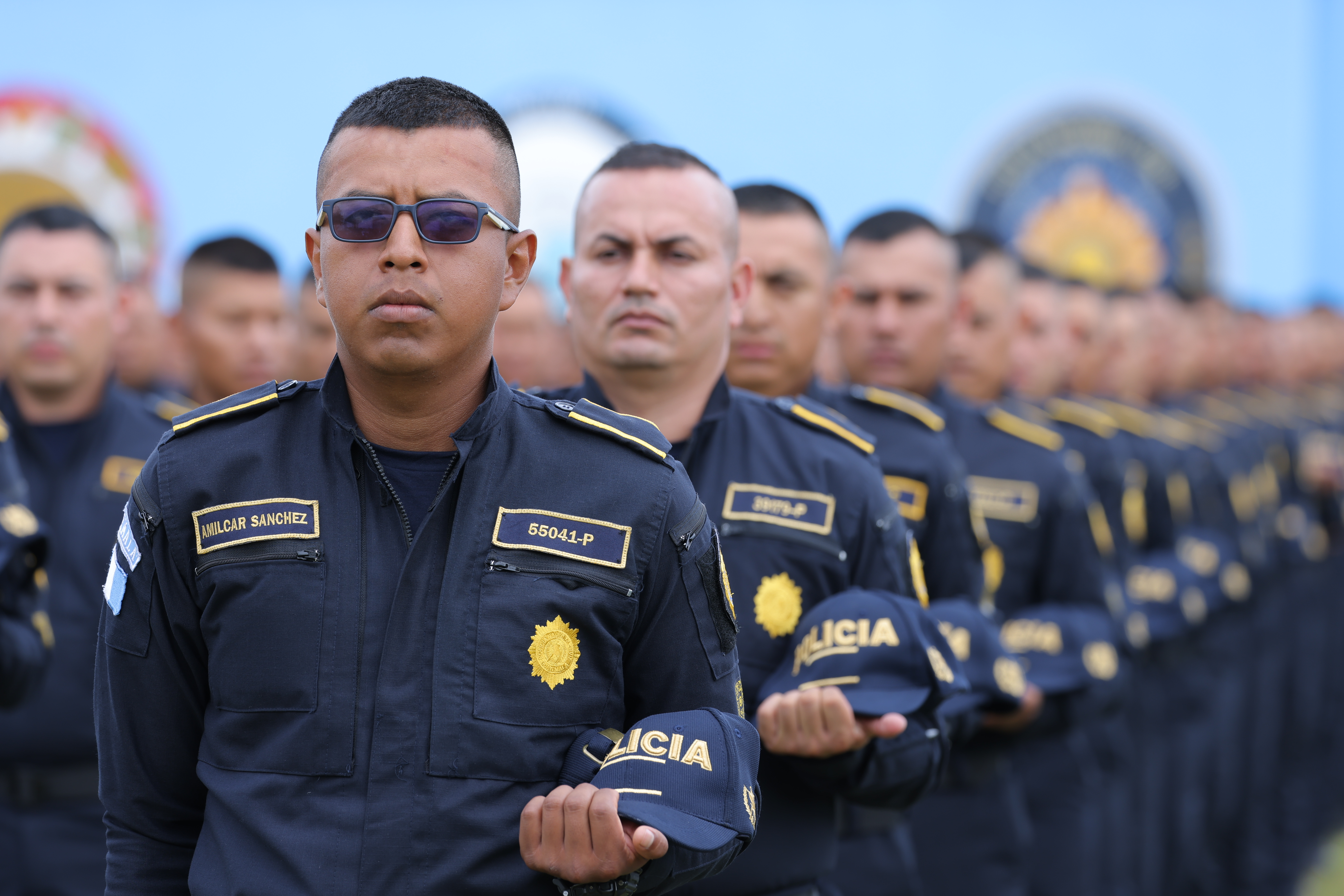
- Cadets at their graduation.
  Technical Secretariat (STO)
- Division of Joint Operations (DOC)
- Market Police Division (POLIMERC)
- Division of Special Police Forces (DIFEP)
- Division of Personnel Protection and Security (DPPS)
- Division of Supervision and Control of Private Security Companies (DSCESP)
- Tourism Security Division (DISETUR)
- Division of Protection of Nature (DIPRONA)
- Division of Ports, Airports and Border Posts (DIPAFRONT) (In the process of dissolution)
- Motorized Division (DM)

=== Director-General ===
- July 1997 – January 2000: Ángel Antonio Conte Cojulún
- 2000–2004: Mario René Cifuentes, Baudilio Portillo Merlos, Rudio Lécsan Mérida, Fredy Enrique López, Enio Rivera, Luis Arturo Paniagua, Raúl Manchamé, Óscar Segura, Eder Joel Cabrera y Gustavo Adolfo Dubón Gálvez
- July 2004 – April 2007: Erwin Sperisen Vernon
- April 2007 – September 2007: Julio Hernández Chávez
- September 2007 – September 2008: Isabel Mendoza Agustín
- September 2008 – June 2009: Marlene Blanco Lapola
- June 2009 – August 2009: Porfirio Pérez Paniagua
- August 2009 – March 2010: Pedro Baltazar Gómez Barrios
- June 2010 – January 2012: Jaime Leonel Otzin
- January 2012 – July 2013: Gerzon Wilfredo Oliva Ramos
- July 2013 – March 2015: Telemaco Pérez García
- March 2015 – September 2015: Walter René Vásquez Cerón
- September 2015 – : Nery Abilio Ramos

== Armament ==
Assault Rifles
Name	Caliber	Maker	Origin	Image
Tavor	5.56 mm	Israel Military Industries	Israel	
AK-47	7.62 mm	Kalashnikov Concern	Russia	
M16	5.56 mm	Colt's Manufacturing Company	United States	
Machine Gun
Uzi	9×19mm	Israel Military Industries	Israel	
Pistols
Glock 17	9×19mm	Glock Ges.m.b.H.	Austria	
Beretta 92	9×19mm	Beretta	Italy	
Jericho	9×19mm	Israel Military Industries	Israel	

== Ranks ==
The rank structure of the police is as follows.

Rank	Insignia
Agent	
Deputy Inspector	
Inspector	
Officer Third Class	
Officer Second Class	
Officer First Class	
Deputy Commissioner	
Commissioner	
Commissioner General	
Deputy Director General	
Assistant Director General	
Director General	

== See also ==
- Ministry of the Interior (Guatemala)
