= John Smith (housebreaker) =

London housebreaker

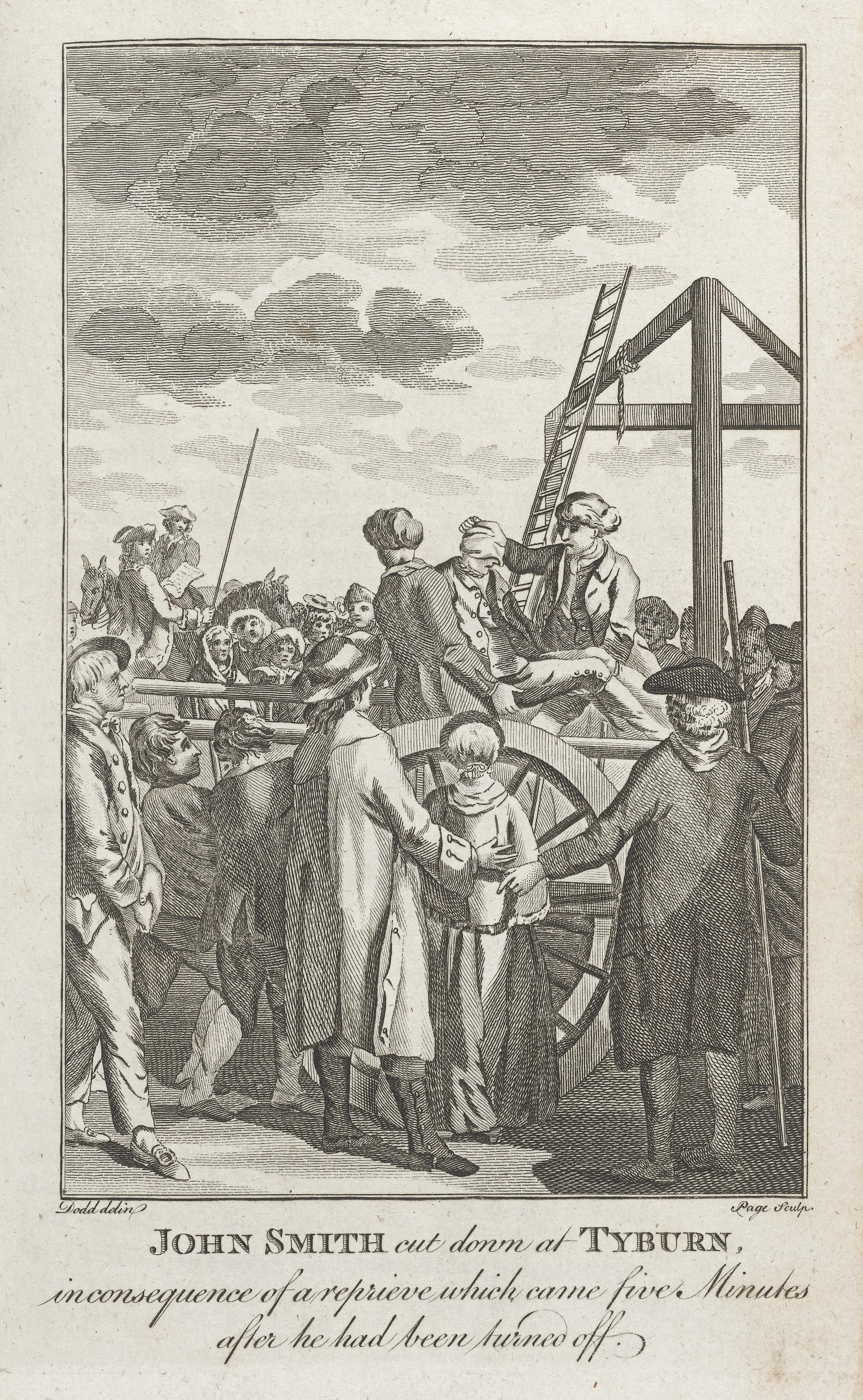
- Smith being cut down at Tyburn
- Born: c. 1661; Malton, North Riding of Yorkshire, England
- Died: After July 1727
- Other names: John Wilson; Half-hanged Smith
- Children: 2
- Status: Transported to Virginia
- Conviction: Housebreaking
- Penalty: Hanging (pardoned after 15 minutes); Transportation

John Smith (c. 1661 – after July 1727), also known by the alias John Wilson, was an English criminal who was notable for his three evasions of execution. His first evasion earned him the nickname of Half-hanged Smith.

== Biography ==
=== Early life and career ===
John Smith was the son of a Malton farmer. He was apprenticed by a packer, and served him as a journeyman. He then went on to serve the navy, first in a merchantman, then in a man-of-war, and was discharged after the Battle of Vigo Bay. Soon after that, he enlisted as a soldier, where he acquainted with bad associates and started his career as a housebreaker.

=== First conviction ===
On 5 December 1705, Smith was accused of four indictments and was convicted of two of them, and was sentenced to death. He showed little concern over his sentence until his execution was ordered on the Christmas Eve of the same year. He was taken to the Tyburn gallows where he was hanged.

Smith's family and friends were present at his hanging. Some attempted to tug at his legs to shorten his suffering, while others held them up for the mere possibility that Smith would not die. Others fought over the body with anatomists. After hanging for a quarter of an hour, the people cried out 'A reprieve'! The reprieve was granted, and Smith was cut down. He was taken to a house in the neighbourhood, where he recovered.

When asked what his feelings were during the execution, Smith replied:

I remember a great pain caused by the weight of my body. My spirits were in a great uproar, pushing upwards; when they got into my head I saw a great blaze of glaring light that seemed to go out of my head in a flash. Then the pain went. When I was cut down I got such pins-and-needles pains in my head that I could have hanged the people who set me free.

Smith was granted freedom a few months later, on 20 February 1706.

=== Second conviction ===
John Smith turned back to housebreaking upon release. He was soon caught and was tried at the Old Bailey. Due to some complications of his case, the jury left the verdict to the twelve judges. The judges decided to set him free.

=== Third conviction ===
When he was caught again, there appeared to be no hope for Smith on his third prosecution. It seemed as if the judge would certainly sentence him to an execution once and for all. However, the prosecutor died on the day before the trial was to commence, and Smith was once again set free.

=== Final conviction and transportation ===
On 17 May 1727, 66-year-old Smith (using the name John Wilson) was found stealing a padlock. Two watchmen had seen him and another man trying to steal the padlock, so they went up to investigate. The other man escaped, but Smith was found with eight picklock keys. Smith attempted to get rid of the padlock, although the padlock was later found in the 'Channel'.

Although it was agreed that Smith had intended to burgle the warehouse, Smith was found guilty only of theft. He was sentenced to transportation to Virginia. He then lodged an appeal to Sir John Eyles Knight, the Lord Mayor, requesting for physical punishment in lieu of transportation. In spite of his physical disabilities and role as a father of two children, the court took no pity on him and he was taken to Virginia on the Susannah in July 1727.

== See also ==
- Hanging
- Half-hanging
- Gallows
- William Duell
