= Ministry of the Interior (Guatemala) =

Government ministry of Guatemala

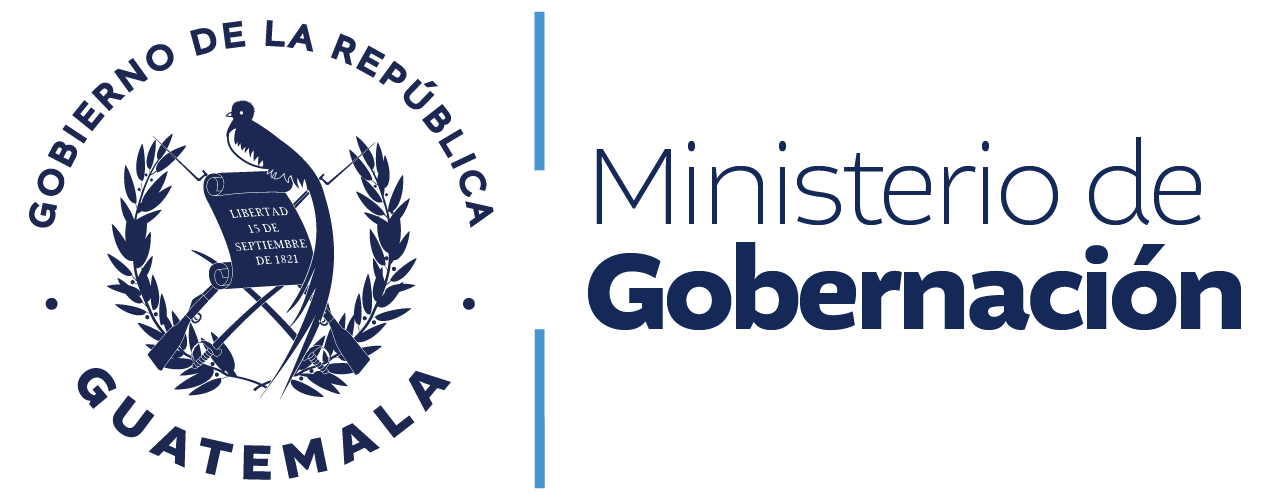
- Ministry logo

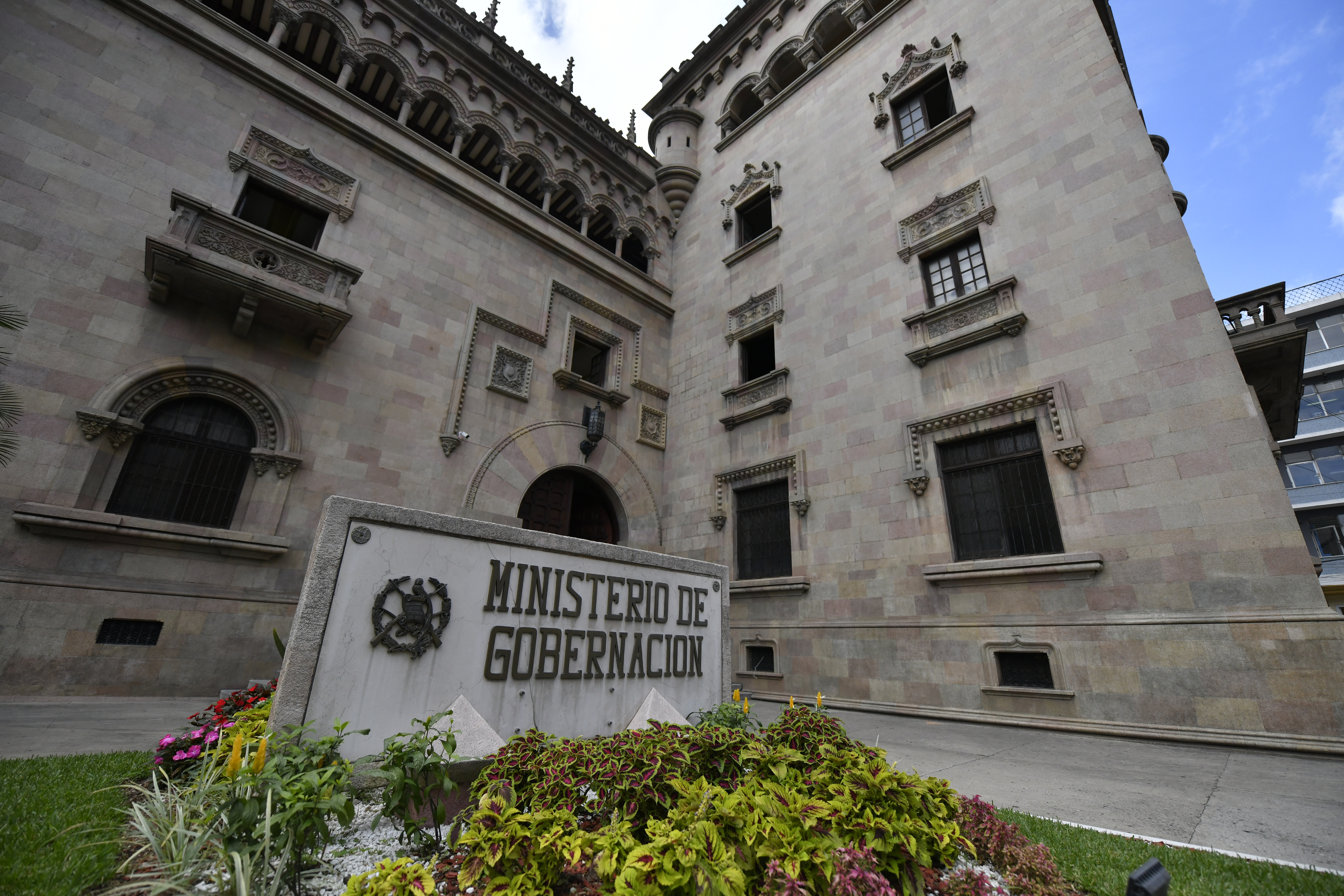
- Office of the ministry, located in the National Palace

Ministry overview
- Formed: April 26, 1839; 187 years ago
- Jurisdiction: Guatemala
- Headquarters: 14th Street and 6a avenue, Zone 1, Guatemala City
- Ministry executive: Marco Antonio Villeda Sandoval, Minister
- Website: gob.gt

The Ministry of the Interior (Spanish: Ministerio de Gobernación or MINGOB) is a government ministry of Guatemala, headquartered in Zone 1 of Guatemala City.

== Agencies ==
- Dirección General del Sistema Penitenciario de Guatemala - Prison system
- Policía Nacional Civil (Guatemala) (ES)
- Bomberos Voluntarios (Guatemala) (ES)
