= Manuel Martínez Coronado =

Guatemalan mass murderer

- Coronado being escorted to the execution chamber at Pavon Prison
- Born: 1964/1965; Guatemala
- Died: 10 February 1998 (aged 33 or 34); Pavon Prison, Fraijanes, Guatemala
- Occupation: Farmer
- Spouse: Manuela Giron
- Children: 3
- Status: Executed by lethal injection
- Motive: Land dispute
- Conviction: Murder (7 counts)
- Penalty: Death

Details
- Victims: 7
- Date: May 17th 1995
- Country: Guatemala

Manuel Martínez Coronado (1964 or 1965 – 10 February 1998) was a Guatemalan mass murderer, convicted for the killing of seven people on May 17, 1995. Coronado was sentenced to death for the murders, and was executed in 1998, the first execution by lethal injection in Guatemala.

== Background ==
Manuel Martínez Coronado was a member of the Chortí ethnic group who worked as a peasant farmer.

== Murders ==
Coronado murdered seven members of the same family on May 17, 1995 over a land dispute. He was aided by his stepfather, Daniel Arias. The victims were Juan Bautista Arias, 58, his wife Rosalbina Miguel, their children Francias, 12, Jovita, 8, Arnoldo, 5, and Aníbal, 2, and his sister, Emilia Arias, 68.

== Arrest and execution ==
Coronado was arrested and charged with multiple counts of homicide. Following a brief trial, he became the first Guatemalan to be sentenced to death by means of lethal injection (which had recently been legalized by the government). Too old to be executed, Arias, who was in his mid 60s, was sentenced to 30 years in prison. Amnesty International suggested that Arias had been the triggerman in the murders.

Despite pleas from Amnesty International to overturn the verdict, the Guatemalan authorities ruled that his sentence would be upheld. The execution took place at 6 a.m. (12:00 – GMT) on February 10, 1998, and was broadcast live as a national television event. It took eighteen minutes for him to die from the onset of drug administration; the sounds of his wife and children crying could be heard by the television audience throughout the ordeal.

Coronado's mother claimed that he had converted to Christianity on death row and had asked God for forgiveness.

== Criticism ==
Amnesty International, which had protested his death sentence, complained that doctors carrying out the execution was a "breach of medical ethics" and that Guatemalan authorities refused to release the identities of the healthcare workers who carried out the execution.

== See also ==
- List of rampage killers
- Capital punishment in Guatemala
