= Kidnapping of Joseph Budna =

2025 kidnapping in Belize

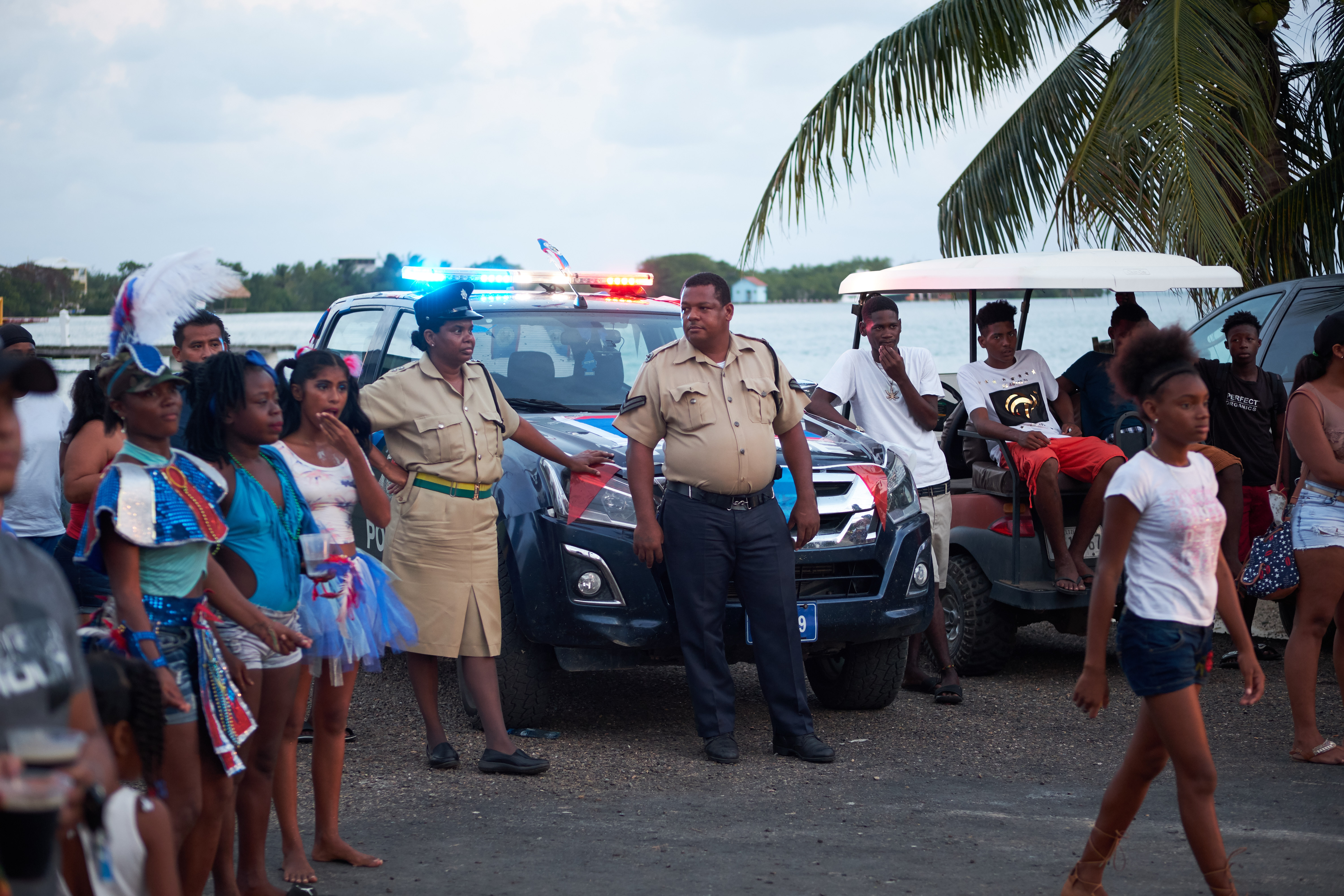
- Belizean police (centre) on duty in 2018
- Date: 22 August 2025
- Time: ca 8:30 or ca 9:00 pm CT
- Location: Hospital Crescent, Orange Walk, Orange Walk, Belize; 18.08349°N 88.55959°W
- Type: Kidnapping (official); state-sponsored extrajudicial extradition (unofficial, alleged)
- Motive: Unknown (official); to censor a prominent critic of government and police (unofficial, alleged)
- Target: 1 man (Budna)
- Perpetrators: 3 unidentified men (official); Belizean police (unofficial, alleged)
- Injuries: 1 (Budna)
- Missing: 1 (Budna)
- Charges: 0 (Feb 2026)
- Litigation: Ongoing (Feb 2026)

At about 8:30 or 9:00 pm CT on 22 August 2025, on Hospital Crescent in Orange Walk Town, Belize, 45 year old Joseph Budna (Note: In official sources, named Joseph Budna in Press Office 2025b; Ryan Budna in none; Joseph Ryan Budna in 7News 2025ab, Love News 2025n, Press Office 2025e, News 5 2025an; Ryan Joseph Budna in Press Office 2025a, Press Office 2025f. Variously named in unofficial sources (like press).) was abducted by three unidentified men in a blue Chevy Equinox. Press located him the following afternoon in Melchor de Mencos, Peten, Guatemala, in the custody of that country's authorities. Budna, a Belizean national, immediately alleged that his abductors had been Belizean police officers, and that they had unlawfully spirited him across the border to their Guatemalan counterparts. These mysterious circumstances and provocative allegations sparked significant interest and controversy in politics, the press, and the public at large.

As of February 2026, the case remains unsolved, officially (no suspects have been named, arrested, or charged). Unofficially, though, press leaks and public speculation in Belize have tended to lend credence to Budna's allegations, making this a suspected (unconfirmed) case of state-sponsored extrajudicial extradition. The political scandal there has notably led to mandatory leave for a Commissioner of Police (a first for the country).

== Background ==
In 2025, Joseph Budna was a 45 year old blogger, social media personality, and purported (Note: Press credentials disputed since 2012 (Ambergris Today 2012a; News 5 2012b; 7News 2012c; "Guat police kill extortionist in Quetzaltenango City". Amandala. 8 May 2012.) up to 2020s (Love News 2023a; Love News 2024b; Amandala 2025d), including post-kidnapping (Amandala 2025f; Centroamérica360 2025a; Amandala 2025h). Credentials otherwise accepted since 2010 (Amandala 2010b), including post-kidnapping (Love News 2025n; Reporter 2025d; Reporter 2025c; 7News 2025g).) freelance journalist based in Trial Farm, Orange Walk. He rose to prominence in the 2010s for his reporting, public antics, (Note: Deemed a personality since 2011 ("dramatic" in 7News 2011b; "shadowed by unusual circumstances" in News 5 2012a; "has had quite a bad reputation" in Ambergris Today 2012a; "very strange and perpetually sensational" in Belize Times 2016a; "has always had an aptitude for ending up in embarrassing and suspiciously dangerous situations" in Guardian 2016a; "eccentric" in Amandala 2019a) up to 2020s ("no stranger to the media or the law" in Love News 2023d), including post-kidnapping ("controversial" in News 5 2025i, Reporter 2025a, News 5 2025o, Centroamérica360 2025a). Notably: "spearheaded the effort" to secure release of Belizean national detained in Melchor, Peten in 2010 ("Belizean trapped in a Guat jail for ½ pound of weed". Amandala. 17 December 2010.; "Gonguez gets out of Guatemalan jail!". 7News. 30 December 2010.; "Dennis Gonguez returns home after month in Melchor jail". Amandala. 4 January 2011.; "Gonguez gone clear". 7News. 5 January 2011.); was allegedly brutalised in Cantel, Quetzaltenango for Belizean forest rangers' recent killing of 14 year old Julio Alvarado Ruano in 2016 ("Budna, victimized for tense border relations?". 7News. 26 April 2016.; "Joseph Budna is assaulted in Guatemalan prison". News 5. 26 April 2016.; Guardian 2016a; Belize Times 2016a; 7News 2019e); avoided extradition to Guatemala in 2019 ("The process for Joseph Budna to be handed over to Guatemalan authorities". News 5. 12 July 2019.; 7News 2019e; "Police say they had no reason to hold Budna". 7News. 15 July 2019.; News 5 2019d; "Joseph Budna free, but for how long?". Amandala. 17 July 2019.; News 5 2025i); was whipped in San Felipe, Orange Walk in 2025 (7News 2025f; "Have police shown bias against Budna?". 7News. 26 August 2025.; "Minister Jose Mai dismisses conspiracy theories linking him to Budna's transfer to Guatemala". Love News. 27 August 2025.; "Mai didn't intervene to help man who whipped Budna". 7News. 27 August 2025.; "Mai doesn't want that Budna smoke". 7News. 9 October 2025.; "From behind bars, Budna blasts Mai". 7News. 2 December 2025.). See also run-ins with law.) and varied run-ins with the law. The latter were especially extensive: pending charges in six cases, (Note: In Guatemala, 2012: for allegedly "being the ringleader of a gang of kidnappers operating in Belize, Mexico, Honduras and Guatemala" ("Budna again? This time Guats say he's a kidnapper!". 7News. 6 September 2012.; News 5 2012b; "Budna arrested in Guatemala". Amandala. 7 September 2012.; Ambergris Today 2012a; 7News 2012c; "Joseph Budna: kidnapper, arms dealer, sexual abuser". News 5. 7 September 2012.; 7News 2025f). In Belize, 2021: for alleged sexual assault of a minor ("Joseph Budna receives Supreme Court bail on sex crime against a minor". Love News. 2 July 2021.). In Belize, 2021: for alleged sexual assault of another minor ("The notorious Joseph Budna behind bars, again". BBN. 19 August 2021.; "Bad business, Budna". 7News. 19 August 2021.). In Belize, 2024: for alleged defamation and cyberbullying of Ramon Cervantes MP ("PUP Monchie's cyberbullying complaint against Budna". 7News. 9 February 2024.; "Joseph Budna wanted by police for alleged cyber bullying". News 5. 9 February 2024.; "Wanted: Joseph Budna faces cyberbullying charges against Orange Walk North representative". Love News. 9 February 2024.; "Joseph Budna is arrested and charged for cyber bullying". News 5. 13 February 2024.; "Joseph Budna granted bail in defamation and cyberbullying case". Love News. 13 February 2024.; "Budna says he was unjustly detained by GI3". 7News. 13 February 2024.; "Police nearing conclusion in cyberbullying case against Belize figure". Love News. 22 February 2024.; "Cybercrime investigation files against Joseph Budna now with DPP". News 5. 22 February 2024.; Amandala 2025f). In Belize, 2024: for alleged abetment to murder in fatal stabbing of 50 year old Armando Coy Cacao in Belmopan ("Breaking: Police charge Joseph Budna in 2021 murder report". BBN. 24 July 2024.; "Freelance 'journalist' Joseph Budna arrested for alleged role in 2021 murder". Love News. 26 July 2024.; "Budna for abetment to murder in 3 year old homicide". 7News. 26 July 2024.; "Budna charged with abetment to murder". News 5. 26 July 2024.; Love News 2024b; "Budna behind bars, says GOB wants to silence him". 7News. 29 July 2024.; "ComPol Williams on Joseph Budna's arrest". News 5. 29 July 2024.; "Police Commissioner's 'Cold Case Team' nabs suspects in multiple major crimes, including Joseph Budna". BBN. 30 July 2024.; "He said Gov would kill him in jail, so Budna in protective custody". 7News. 31 July 2024.; "Joseph Budna released on bail of $15,000; court orders he stay off-radar pending outcome of case". BBN. 3 August 2024.; "Joseph Budna claims his life is in danger". News 5. 5 August 2024.; "Joseph Budna speaks after murder abetment arrest". News 5. 5 August 2024.; "Budna out on bail, expands on wild conspiracies". 7News. 5 August 2024.; "Commissioner of Police responds to claims by self-proclaimed journalist Joseph Budna". Love News. 6 August 2024.; "ComPol no comment on Budna". 7News. 6 August 2024.; News 5 2025i; 7News 2025f; Amandala 2025f). In Belize, 2025: for alleged cyberbullying of a private individual ("'Humble servant' Joseph Budna faced with cyberbullying charges". 7News. 2 June 2025.; Love News 2025c; "Joseph Budna thrown back in jail—this time for cyberbullying". BBN. 4 June 2025.; Amandala 2025d; 7News 2025d; "Joseph Budna pleads guilty to cyberbullying charges". BBN. 10 June 2025.; "Blogger out on bail after being charged under Cyberbullying Act". Love News. 10 June 2025.; Amandala 2025f).) convictions in a further three, (Note: In Belize, 2000s: for unnatural crime and aggravated assault of a 14 year old boy ("Arrests made in Orange Walk rapes". News 5. 29 February 2000.; "Inmate talked out of jumping from prison water tower". News 5. 11 October 2006.; Amandala 2019a; News 5 2025i; 7News 2025f; Reporter 2025a). In Guatemala, 2013: for kidnapping of 19 year old Luis Byron Reyes Onofre ("Budna could get major years in Guatemalan jail". 7News. 10 May 2013.; "Budna gets 25 years in Guat jail". Amandala. 17 May 2013.; "Budna gets 'shilling'". 7News. 17 May 2013.; "Budna speaks from Guatemala, says he will be cleared on appeal". 7News. 20 May 2013.; "Joseph Budna's troubles continue". Amandala. 28 June 2013.; "Guat court levies attempted murder charges against Budna". Amandala. 12 July 2013.; "Budna gets over some legal hurdles". 7News. 15 August 2013.; Amandala 2025f). In Guatemala, 2014: for kidnapping of 23 year old Abimael Lopez Palma ("Budna faces another kidnapping hearing in Guatemala". Amandala. 28 January 2014.; "Joseph Budna gets more years behind bars in Guatemala". BBN. 13 May 2014.; News 5 2014c; "Budna gets 30 more years". Amandala. 16 May 2014.; Reporter 2025a). Sentenced to prison time in each case.) two prison breaks, (Note: In 2014, from Guatemalan custody: soon reapprehended in Las Flores, Chiquimula ("Belizean convicted in Guatemala escapes from prison". BBN. 21 April 2014.; "Budna on the run!". 7News. 22 April 2014.; "Joseph Budna escapes Guatemalan prison". News 5. 22 April 2014.; "Budna back in jail". 7News. 24 April 2014.; "Joseph Budna escapes Guat custody – two prison guards arrested". Amandala. 25 April 2014.; "Budna recaptured while trying to enter Honduras". Amandala. 30 April 2014.). In 2019, from Guatemalan custody: soon reapprehended in Camalote, Cayo ("Belizean prisoner escapes in Guatemala". BBN. 27 May 2019.; "Budna escapes from Guatemalans again". 7News. 28 May 2019.; "No safe haven in Belize for escapee Joseph Budna, police say". BBN. 29 May 2019.; "Joseph Budna, 38, escapes from hospital in San Benito, Guatemala". Amandala. 1 June 2019.; "Escaped prisoner Joseph Budna is recaptured in Camalote, Cayo". News 5. 11 July 2019.; "On the run from Guatemala, Budna found in Camalote". 7News. 11 July 2019.; Amandala 2019a; "Joseph Budna was also wanted in Belize". News 5. 12 July 2019.; "Budna alleges physical abuse in Guatemalan lockup". News 5. 16 July 2019.; News 5 2019d; News 5 2025i; 7News 2025f; Amandala 2025f).) and various other encounters with police. (Note: In US, 2010s: wanted by authorities for alleged hostage taking ("Belize has 6 of Interpol's Most Wanted". 7News. 13 April 2017.; "Joseph Budna wanted again, according to Crime Stoppers International, Interpol Red Notice". BBN. 16 August 2021.). In Belize, 2011: detained in San Ignacio, Cayo when 3.9 pounds (1.8 kg) of suspected cannabis were found in his vehicle (7News 2011a; "Budna bailed". 7News. 19 May 2011.; 7News 2025f). In Belize, 2011: detained again in San Ignacio for undisclosed reason (7News 2011b; "Businessman to sue because cops locked him up". News 5. 7 November 2011.; News 5 2025i). In Belize, 2020: detained in Belmopan for undisclosed reason ("Joseph Budna alleges police harassment". News 5. 27 January 2020.; "Is Joseph Budna paranoid?". News 5. 27 January 2020.). In Belize, 2023: detained in San Ignacio when 16 year old Kelvin Hernandez was shot and killed in his residence ("'Kevin' killed, Joseph Budna injured in San Ignacio shooting". News 5. 21 August 2023.; "Minor murdered in Budna's bedroom". 7News. 21 August 2023.; Love News 2023a; Love News 2023d; "Investigation continues into shooting of minor and Joseph Budna". Love News. 23 August 2023.; "I.D. confirmed for minor murdered in Budna's bedroom". 7News. 23 August 2023.; "Joseph Budna and presumed minor shot while in bed". Amandala. 23 August 2023.; "Budna's side of the story". 7News. 23 August 2023.; "What will become of Budna?". 7News. 24 August 2023.; "Joseph Budna challenges Police Commissioner's version of teen's murder". Love News. 24 August 2023.; "ComPol says Budna's act is bogus". 7News. 28 August 2023.; "18-year-old charged for killing 16-year-old in Budna's room". 7News. 31 August 2023.; "Teen charged for shooting Budna and minor". Amandala. 2 September 2023.; News 5 2025i; 7News 2025f).) The former (his reporting) was notably brash and critical of police and political figures. (Note: Deemed so post-kidnapping ("gained a large social media following where he frequently accused the government of corruption" in News 5 2025h; "made both friends and enemies ... was popular enough to be known nationally. Brave, undeterred, in your face, egotistic, and with a tonne of arrogance, there was very little that he was not afraid to tackle" in Reporter 2025c; "made many enemies in Belize with his devil-may-care style of reporting" in 7News 2025g; "had been prying into the business of big people here" in "Joseph Budna kidnapping, about extradition". Amandala. 31 August 2025.; "known for his outspoken reporting and Facebook Live broadcasts criticising government and police misconduct" in Love News 2025n). Notably: first story penned was on police brutality in San Ignacio, Cayo in 2010 (Amandala 2010b); latest story broadcast involved words with PM in 2025 (7News 2025f; News 5 2025j; "Budna makes plea for his own safety, blames government". 7News. 3 September 2025.; News 5 2025ac). See also run-ins with law.)

By then, police in Orange Walk had already distinguished themselves from those elsewhere in Belize for their brutality and abuses, becoming one of five police entities in the country to earn a US Leahy sanction in 2019. (Note: With Belmopan, Ladyville, San Ignacio, and GSU police since 2017 ("Transparency in the Leahy laws: Who is banned?". Human Rights First. 30 May 2025.).) Notably, this extended to abuses against journalists: Vejea Alvarez (Love FM) in 2021, and Marisol Amaya (Krem TV) in 2017.

== Kidnapping ==
1 Orange Walk (in Belize)
2 Arenal (on the border)
3 Melchor de Mencos (in Guatemala)

At circa 7:45 or 8:15 pm CT on 22 August 2025, Joseph Budna began livestreaming on Facebook from a spot near the police station in Orange Walk, Orange Walk. Some 45 minutes later, Budna abruptly ended his livestream after looking about his surroundings and noting, "I heard something just now. I heard somebody say Budna. Nobody's around. Let me go ... Let me move from here now ... Anyway, bye, bye, bye, bye. Come on back in a while". (Note: 7News 2025g; News 5 2025ac; 7News 2025be. Verbatim (in Kriol, per 7News 2025g): "I heah something just now. I heah somebody seh Budna. Nobody deh round. Mek me goh. Mek I goh because we have a big ghost tree back there. And me noh de pon they simpleness. Let me move from here now. Cause me one deh yah. Anyway, bye, bye, bye, bye. Come on back in a while.". Verbatim (in Kriol, per News 5 2025j): "Listen to me ... I hear something just now. I hear somebody say Budna. Nobody deh around here. Let me go, and unu the mek I feel a way, look at the boo boo three, right there you can see it".)

At approximately 8:30 or 9:00 pm (Note: Disputed in sources: circa 8:30 pm in 7News 2025t, 7News 2025be, News 5 2025bd; circa 9:00 pm in Press Office 2025a, Amandala 2025f, Love News 2025g, Silva 2025a, Amandala 2025h, BBN 2025a, News 5 2025g, News 5 2025e.) on Hospital Crescent ("a strone's throw" from the police station (Note: Love News 2025g; Amandala 2025h; Silva 2025a; Love News 2025i; 7News 2025u; Silva 2025b. Some 100 feet (Silva 2025a; Silva 2025b; Reporter 2025b; 7News 2025bg; 7News 2025u; 7News 2025bf) or yards (BBN 2025c; Amandala 2025f).)), Budna was approached by three unidentified men who forced him into a blue (Note: Disputed in sources: blue in Love News 2025i, News 5 2025bf, Love News 2025l, Silva 2025a, Reporter 2025b, 7News 2025bg, Silva 2025b, 7News 2025o; sky-blue in 7News 2025bf, 7News 2025l, 7News 2025bh; dark-coloured in Press Office 2025a, Amandala 2025f, News 5 2025j.) Chevy Equinox (Note: Disputed in sources: SUV in Press Office 2025a, Amandala 2025f; Chevy Equinox in News 5 2025j, Love News 2025i, News 5 2025bf, Love News 2025l, Silva 2025a, Reporter 2025b, 7News 2025bg, Silva 2025b, 7News 2025o, 7News 2025bf, 7News 2025l, 7News 2025bh, 7News 2025i.) bearing Belize City licence plates. (Note: Press Office 2025a; BBN 2025a; Amandala 2025f; BBN 2025c; News 5 2025k; News 5 2025w; Love News 2025l; Amandala 2025h; News 5 2025ac; News 5 2025ad; News 5 2025ap; Love News 2025i; 7News 2025k; News 5 2025be; 7News 2025bf. 7News tentatively identified the model year as 2015 (7News 2025o). Budna alleged a second vehicle had been involved, tentatively identified by 7News as a 2010–2012 silver Ford Explorer (7News 2025o).) The scuffle lasted mere minutes, (Note: BBN 2025a; News 5 2025j; Silva 2025a; Reporter 2025b. Lasted three minutes per Silva 2025a, 7News 2025be, 7News 2025bg, Love News 2025i, Silva 2025b.) with bystanders attempting but failing to intervene. Notably, later press leaks (including CCTV footage) seemingly confirmed that a uniformed (on duty) police officer responded to the (loud) skirmish, conversed for a bit with one of the aggressors, and shortly returned to the station sans any attempt at intervening (other than to get a concerned civilian to back off). (Note: See sections First leaks and Cover-up speculation.)

Allegedly, the kidnappers drove Budna to Arenal, Cayo, (Note: News 5 2025l; Silva 2025a; Amandala 2025h. Possibly clearing a police checkpoint on Hydro Road, Cayo (News 5 2025l; 7News 2025i; 7News 2025k; "Budna says officer at Arenal checkpoint tried to stop abductors". 7News. 3 September 2025.; 7News 2025v; Silva 2025a; News 5 2025ac; News 5 2025j), which since 7:25 pm that night was being manned by an unnamed SPU corporal (News 5 2025l; 7News 2025i).) where they handed him over to Guatemalan police in Arenal, Peten "in the very late hours of Friday night [22 or 23 August]". (Note: News 5 2025l; Silva 2025a. Or "between midnight and 1:00 am" on 23 August (7News 2025o).)

== Aftermath ==
=== In Guatemala ===
Joseph Budna was detained by Policía Nacional Civil officers on 22 or 23 August in Arenal, Peten. (Note: Amandala 2025f; News 5 2025l. Location given as Melchor, Peten by some early reports (like in Prensa Libre 2025a, News 5 2025k).) Details of said detention varied. Budna claimed he had been handed over to Guatemalan police hours after his kidnapping (circa midnight of 22–23 August). Guatemalan authorities initially declined to furnish details, (Note: News 5 2025g; Press Office 2025a; Silva 2025a. By 24 August, PNC "ha[d] not disclosed the details surrounding his [Budna's] apprehension" to BPD (Press Office 2025a; BBN 2025b; News 5 2025g; Caribbean Times 2025a; Suriname Times 2025; Jamaica Gleaner 2025; Caribbean Times 2025b). Per Commissioner: "a media house forwarded us a post on social media on the following evening [23 August] and we then contacted our counterparts at PNC in Guatemala who confirmed Joseph Budna was detained in Melchor on an arrest warrant. No other information was provided to us" (News 5 2025k).) but later claimed Budna had been detained "around noon on [23 August] when local officers observed he was walking in a 'suspicious manner'", and arrested under warrant once positively identified via Interpol. On 23 August, Budna was transferred to Melchor, Peten, where a medical doctor (Rafael Aguilar) certified his injuries did not require hospitalisation (as he had "exhibited numerous injuries" when detained). (Note: Amandala 2025f; "Budna shows his injuries from Guat jail, says BZ cops responsible". 7News. 1 September 2025.; 7News 2025q; Amandala 2025h. On 29 September, Budna alleged his injuries had still not healed (7News 2025ad; BBN 2025g). Reiterated on 2 December (7News 2025ap; 7News 2025aq).) Later that afternoon, Guatemalan press reported Budna had been apprehended in Arenal, Peten, pursuant to a 2019 warrant for his arrest, (Note: "Ryan Budna detained in Guatemala: Report". News 5. 23 August 2025.; "Guatemala media claims Budna detained again, hours after disappearing in Belize". BBN. 23 August 2025.; News 5 2025g; Love News 2025e; News 5 2025j; Prensa Libre 2025a; Amandala 2025h; News 5 2025ac; News 5 2025ad. But citing Guatemala's Policía Nacional Civil: Prensa Libre reported la captura (lit. 'the capture') of Budna was on 23 August in Melchor, Peten (Prensa Libre 2025a); the Commissioner of Police (Richard Rosado) said, "we then contacted our counterparts at PNC in Guatemala who confirmed Joseph Budna was detained in Melchor on an arrest warrant" (News 5 2025k); Centroamérica360 reported su recaptura en el municipio de Melchor de Mencos (lit. 'his recapture in the municipality of Melchor de Mencos') (Centroamérica360 2025a).) with the Ministerio de Relaciones Exteriores "stress[ing] that the matter is in the hands of the Ministerio de Gobernación, without offering further details". By 25 August, Budna had been transferred to Centro de Detención Preventiva para Hombres, a high-security prison in Zona 18, Guatemala City. (Note: Love News 2025e, 7News 2025m; Amandala 2025h. On 29 September, Budna alleged Guatemalan authorities had gagged him, ostensibly at the request of the Belizean embassy there (7News 2025ad; BBN 2025g; Amandala 2025i). On 2 December, he noted consular staff had not checked in since their first visit in early September (7News 2025ap); Foreign Minister (Francis Fonseca) said, "it's not for them to be visiting him weekly ... he can reach out to them and they will respond" ("Budna says embassy visited once, FM says he's got their number". 7News. 5 December 2025.). On 29 October, a concerned Belizean (who had visited the prison) noted, "this is one of the most dangerous prisons here in Guatemala ... a prison where everybody's loose, where the gangs run the prison. There's no uniformed police [corrections officers] in there ... there's no security ... he's [Budna's] definitely not in a safe place" ("Belizean in Guate City went to visit Budna in dangerous jail". 7News. 29 October 2025.). On 23 January 2026, Saldivar noted prison conditions were making it difficult for Budna to retain a Guatemalan lawyer ("[it] is one of the most dangerous prisons in Central America ... before this riot happened, we went through four attorneys in Guatemala, four. Once they went there and came back out, they would not go back"; "Budna can't get a Guatemalan attorney". 7News. 23 January 2026.).)

=== In Belize ===
At circa 9:30 or 10:00 pm on 22 August, a Facebook user made a public post claiming Budna had been kidnapped. Press broke the news the following noon, after police unofficially confirmed an active investigation into an "incident" on Hospital Crescent involving Budna.

On 24 August, the Police Department "acknowledge[d] the significant public interest in this case and the concerns raised through social media platforms" by officially confirming they had launched an investigation "into an incident involving Mr Ryan Joseph Budna", pursuant to a police report filed by an alleged eyewitness. They further confirmed Budna was in Guatemalan custody, and revealed a "vehicle of interest" and surveillance footage were in their possession. (Note: Press Office 2025a; BBN 2025b; News 5 2025f; News 5 2025g; Amandala 2025f. Press revealed police had secured Budna's mobile phone, personal effects, and black 2010 GMC Acadia from Hospital Crescent (BBN 2025a; News 5 2025e).) That same day: News 5 obtained an audio recording "allegedly featur[ing] Budna claiming he was abducted by Belize police officers outside the Orange Walk Police Station after a live media report [and that] he was beaten, transported to Arenal on the border, and handed over to Guatemalan authorities"; (Note: News 5 2025f; BBN 2025b; News 5 2025g; News 5 2025j; Amandala 2025h; News 5 2025ac. Verbatim (allegedly): "And as I logged off the live, police ran from near the police station and from Banquita yard with masks. They wapped me in the head, taped my mouth and handcuffed me and dashed me in a sky-blue SUV ... They travelled for almost three hours and my eyes were blinded with grey duct tape and when I opened my eyes, it was at the Arenal football field when I saw three national civilian [Guatemalan] police and they came out of the[ir] vehicle. Belizean police came out of the vehicle and handed me over to the Guatemalans through that area, on the football field at Arenal" (News 5 2025j).) the Opposition (including Tracy Panton, Moses Barrow) raised alarm over the possibility of state or foreign involvement in the alleged kidnapping, noting, "if one Belizean can be abducted by foreign or state agents, then we are all at risk".

By 25 August, a second audio recording had surfaced, allegedly featuring Budna reiterating his prior allegations and further claiming his kidnappers' SUV (with Belize City plates) had been tailing him since the night of 21 August. (Note: News 5 2025j; 7News 2025g; BBN 2025c; News 5 2025m; News 5 2025n; News 5 2025o; Amandala 2025h. Verbatim (allegedly): "I was kidnapped on Friday [22 August], just in front of the Orange Walk Police Station, by four police officers who identified themselves as police. Orange Walk police ran out [of the station when they] heard I [had] shouted for help, and as a result of me shouting for help I was hit in the head, gun butt [pistol-whipped] and beaten on the ground. My phones were taken away and I was taped [up]. My mouth was taped with duct tape and [I was] handcuffed and I was thrown inside a blue SUV vehicle and I was taken away immediately. There was communication by the officers [kidnappers] with one Kareem – I don’t know which Kareem it was – and also, one of them mentioned, 'ComPol, you know that we got the man'. And they beat me when I tried to move and get some air, because both officers at the back seat sat on me, one on top of my head and one on top of my back. So they moved while I was handcuffed, and with every move I made, I was gun butt in my stomach, in my ribs – my right ribs – and gun butt in my head. I was beaten badly; I was bleeding inside the vehicle. They travelled for almost about three hours and change, and when they took off, my eyes were blinded with grey duct tape and when I opened my eyes, it was at the Arenal football field where I saw three civilian [Guatemalan] police there. And they came out of the[ir] vehicle. Belizean police [kidnappers then] came out of their vehicle and handed me over to the Guatemalans through that area on the football field in Arenal. They then popped my chain from off my neck; my money – I had about $800 in my pocket – they took that as well, [plus] my chain [necklace] and my two phones. My tennis [shoes] were left inside the vehicle [kidnappers' SUV] because I barely could have walked. And they [Guatemalans] brought me over to Melchor [de Mencos], where I was taken to a cellblock. And thereafter – the other day [23 August] – I was taken to the Melchor de Mencos Hospital. And now [23, 24, or 25 August] I am being transported to the Zone 18 [Guatemala City] preventative prison centre, where I am awaiting to go before the court. But they [kidnappers or police] beat me so bad, and they blindfolded me. I am so badly beaten right now by these [Belizean or Guatemalan] police officers. And [on 22 August] the police from Orange Walk – they ran out [of the police station] to assist, but these guys [the kidnappers] identified themselves as police. And just before this kidnapping, I had also sent the licence plate and the vehicle [description, of the kidnappers' SUV] to the Commanding Officer of Orange Walk [police], Mr Dubon, who has the licence plate of the vehicle as well. [This SUV was] the same vehicle that had – from a night before [21 August] – been following me. So that is what I can say about [that right] now, but I’m not in [a] good health condition – I’m badly beaten" ("Audio recording fuels allegations of high-level collusion in Budna case". Love News. 25 August 2025.).) That same day: Budna's mother (Katherine Williams) gave credence to these claims, (Note: 7News 2025h. And again on 27 August (News 5 2025m; News 5 2025ac), after finally hearing from her son on the evening of 25 August (News 5 2025o).) further alleging her son had been targeted for his outspoken criticism of government; (Note: 7News 2025h. Verbatim: "it's [Budna's kidnapping is] something that has been looking to happen for a long time, just because Joseph was talking about the government and talk[ing] about this one and that one – they don't like him for that because he brings out truth, and he still insists on doing it. And really, actually, it's police who did it though. It's the same police from Orange Walk who did it; they're the same ones who did it ... And they did him so much things while they took him. They beat him; they sat down on him. When he moved to try to breathe, they butted him with the[ir] gun[s]. They taped his eyes; they taped his mouth ... Belize police are the ones who did it; they took him to the place [rendezvous in Arenal] and just dumped him over there like they dump an animal ... I can't sleep in the night; I worry" (7News 2025h). Reiterated on 4 September (News 5 2025s).) the Commissioner (Richard Rosado) gave a press conference on the case, stating, "let me be unequivocally clear, the Police Department was not involved in the apprehension or the alleged extradition of Mr Budna"; (Note: Love News 2025e; News 5 2025j; BBN 2025c; 7News 2025i; News 5 2025m; News 5 2025o; News 5 2025ab; News 5 2025ac; News 5 2025ad. And further denied two specific allegations ostensibly made by Budna (in two audio recordings reported on by press): that officers from the Orange Walk Police Station had responded to the kidnapping in progress (BBN 2025c; News 5 2025k; 7News 2025i; Amandala 2025h), and that the local Officer Commanding had been contacted with details of the kidnappers' SUV (BBN 2025c; 7News 2025i; Amandala 2025h). He also revealed surveillance footage seemingly showed three individuals confronting and kidnapping Budna (News 5 2025k; 7News 2025i). When asked if he was also under investigation (given a specific allegation, ostensibly by Budna, in the said audio recordings: that the kidnappers mentioned ComPol), the Commissioner responded, "anybody can make an allegation, but please allow the investigative process to take its course. And I will repeat, I will unequivocally state, that at no time was I nor the Police Department involved in the apprehension of Budna or in his alleged extradition" (7News 2025i).) the Foreign Ministry reiterated their support for the ongoing police investigation, stated "the Ministry can confirm that there is no evidence to support the assertion that Guatemalan authorities entered Belize to apprehend Mr Budna", and noted that Budna was receiving consular support; the Prime Minister (John Briceno) stated, "the government did not and would never sanction any such thing [extrajudicial extradition] on any citizen of this country". (Note: News 5 2025j; BBN 2025d; 7News 2025j; "Government denies claims of cross-border role in Joseph Budna capture". Love News. 25 August 2025.; News 5 2025ac; News 5 2025ad. Upon being questioned by reporters during an unrelated public event (BBN 2025d). According to BBN, the PM denied government involvement "after an uncomfortably long pause", whilst "his demeanor [during questioning] hardly suggested an ease or preparation to questions he should have known would be coming his way" (BBN 2025d). According to 7News, the PM "got huffy when the media pressed for answers" (7News 2025j).) In the days following: Budna phoned 7News from prison to expand or double down on claims made in the said audio recordings; he and the press expressed misgivings regarding the Commissioner's account of the kidnapping, with 7News finding "a number of glaring inconsistencies and telling deflections"; the MP for Orange Walk East (Kevin Bernard) refused to comment on the case; the MP for Orange Walk South (Jose Mai) denied involvement; (Note: "Minister Jose Mai dismisses conspiracy theories linking him to Budna's transfer to Guatemala". Love News. 27 August 2025. And declined to comment on 9 October ("Mai doesn't want that Budna smoke". 7News. 9 October 2025.). And reiterated non-involvement on 9 December ("After sudden exit, Jose Mai rejects Budna abduction claims". News 5. 9 December 2025.).) Cabinet reportedly discussed the matter. (Note: 7News 2025q. Denied by PM on 4 (BBN 2025e; 7News 2025r; Amandala 2025h) and 5 September (Love News 2025i).)

==== First leaks ====
External videos
- CCTV footage leaked by 7News on 3 September
- 7News commentary on the leaked footage

On 28 August, 7News reported that, according to "reliable reports", surveillance footage showed on-duty police exiting the police station and responding to Budna's kidnapping in progress, being waved off, and returning to the station. (Budna had claimed this had occurred, whilst the Commissioner had specifically denied it.) On 2 September, they reported that, according to "credible reports", the Officer Commanding of Orange Walk (ASP Armando Dubon) had received information regarding an SUV which had been tailing Budna prior to his kidnapping (as Budna had claimed and the Commissioner denied), and had had it searched "only to find that police were driving it". The following evening, they leaked surveillance footage which seemingly showed an on-duty (uniformed) police officer present at the scene of the kidnapping as it unfolded. (Note: 7News 2025bg; "Jules Vasquez says police were involved, independent investigation must happen". 7News. 3 September 2025.; Amandala 2025g; News 5 2025r; Reporter 2025b; "Belizeans react to Budna abduction video: Opinions split". News 5. 4 September 2025.; 7News 2025be; Reporter 2025d; News 5 2025s; "Dickie Bradley points finger at police in Budna case". News 5. 4 September 2025.; Love News 2025h; News 5 2025t; BBN 2025f; Love News 2025i; News 5 2025v; News 5 2025w; News 5 2025x; 7News 2025u; 7News 2025v; 7News 2025w; Love News 2025l; Silva 2025a; Amandala 2025h; News 5 2025ac; 7News 2025av. 7News claimed the "grainy" footage was "redacted by a confidential source" and "verified for authenticity" (Reporter 2025b). 7News further released a mobile phone video recording from Budna reiterating his account and calling for the surveillance tapes to be released (7News 2025bh; "Budna makes plea for his own safety, blames government". 7News. 3 September 2025.; Silva 2025a). Allegations reiterated on 5 September ("Budna directly accuses the state of abduction". 7News. 5 September 2025.). Commissioner responded on 5 September, stating, "I maintain that what is being alleged was not sanctioned by me or my senior command. If the investigations find that protocols were violated, appropriate actions will be taken. Until we have all the facts, I cannot make a legal determination or prejudge the findings ... I will not discuss any evidential material collected by the investigators at this time" ("Police Commissioner breaks silence on Budna abduction video". News 5. 5 September 2025.; News 5 2025ac).) Some days later, Budna positively identified PC Barrington Barry Flowers (Note: In official sources, surnamed Flowers in Press Office 2025d, or Mai in News 5 2025an.) as one of his kidnappers to 7News. (Note: 7News 2025s; Silva 2025a; Silva 2025b; 7News 2025ac. Flowers had been placed on interdiction in April 2025 (by Chester Williams [outgoing Commissioner], following cyberbullying charges), but was reinstated when Rosado took office in May (7News 2025s; 7News 2025ac). In a private message on Facebook (obtained by 7News), Flowers said he was being "wrongfully associated with such a serious matter [Budna kidnapping] and that he condemns the criminal act in the strongest terms" (7News 2025s). On 11 September, 7News revealed Flowers had signed out a CZ 9 mm service pistol (loaded) on 21 August from the Mahogany Street Police Station in Belize City (while on leave, contrary to protocol and reportedly sans the Officer Commandings's [Aaron Gamboa] authority) (7News 2025z; 7News 2025aa; 7News 2025ac; 7News 2025aq; 7News 2025av; Amandala 2026k).)

In response to said reports: three media houses (Channel 7, Channel 5, X-TV) publicly called on the Police Department to release the surveillance tapes in their possession; (Note: 7News 2025o; News 5 2025n; News 5 2025o; 7News 2025t; News 5 2025ac. On 1 September, Channel 7 News Director (Jules Vasquez) further called for an independent (non-police) investigation (7News 2025ai).) Budna's mother (Williams) called for an independent (non-police) probe and the Commissioner's resignation; the Association of Defence Attorneys and well-known lawyers (Arthur Saldivar, Richard Bradley) called for an independent probe and the tapes' release; (Note: "Saldivar demands release of Budna's abduction footage". News 5. 4 September 2025.; "Bradley backs independent probe amid police trust crisis". News 5. 4 September 2025.; 7News 2025t; "Defence attorneys demand independent investigation". News 5. 5 September 2025.; News 5 2025ac; News 5 2025ad. Though some prominent lawyers (Audrey Matura) cautioned against the tapes' release ("Should Budna abduction video be released? Attorney warns against it". News 5. 5 September 2025.). The Bar Association's silence on the matter was noted (News 5 2025ac; News 5 2025al).) the Amandala directly asked the PM to release the tapes (but were rebuffed); the Opposition (Moses Barrow, Tracy Panton) called for an independent probe, the tapes' release, and the Home Minister's and Commissioner's removal; (Note: BBN 2025f; Love News 2025i; 7News 2025t; News 5 2025w; News 5 2025bd; "UDP demands independent investigation into Budna abduction". Love News. 6 September 2025.; Love News 2025k; Amandala 2025h. And criticised government's response, with Panton calling their "radio silence ... absolutely unacceptable" (Love News 2025i). And called for Budna's repatriation (Love News 2025j).) the Trade Union Congress called for a commission of inquiry; (Note: News 5 2025u; "Trade Union Congress calls for Senate inquiry into Budna abduction". BBN. 5 September 2025.; 7News 2025t; "NTUCB demands Senate inquiry into Budna case amid police involvement claims". Love News. 6 September 2025. Adding, "[the Union] expresses grave concern regarding the abduction of a Belizean citizen by masked individuals ... with what appears to be the complicity of Belize law enforcement. Video evidence [surveillance footage leaked on 3 September] shows a disturbing scene where a Belize police officer, rather than intervening to protect a citizen being forcibly taken against their will, appears to have engaged with the alleged kidnappers and subsequently turned away without rendering assistance. The video evidence suggests that, rather than protecting a citizen from being forcibly taken, law enforcement may have actively facilitated this illegal act" (News 5 2025u).) UNIBAM called for the tapes' release; the National Perspective joined calls for the tapes' release and an independent, public inquiry; the Network of NGOs voiced their support for an independent probe. In addition: the Foreign Minister (Francis Fonseca) conceded that an independent inquiry might be possible after the police investigation concluded and "once we’ve established certain things"; the Home Minister (Kareem Musa) called the kidnapping a "crime", (Note: News 5 2025t; "Musa says he had nothing against Budna". 7News. 5 September 2025. And denied personal involvement (given a specific allegation by Budna: that the kidnappers mentioned Kareem) ("Budna says abductors called 'Kareem'; Musa says not him". 7News. 5 September 2025.; News 5 2025y); further denied involvement by government and police's high command (News 5 2025x; 7News 2025v; "Musa: The state did not participate in abduction". 7News. 5 September 2025.; 7News 2025w; "Musa defends Police Commissioner amid criticism over Budna statements". Love News. 6 September 2025.; "Police Minister tried to justify ComPol's blanket exculpation of Police Department". 7News. 23 September 2025.); and declined to speculate on whether rogue cops had been responsible (News 5 2025x; 7News 2025u; "Is there a team of rogue cops?". 7News. 5 September 2025.). Label reiterated 28 January 2026 ("in my opinion, yes, it is clear a crime was committed"; 7News 2026bd, News 5 2026bc).) adding that it warranted an independent investigation, (Note: News 5 2025t; News 5 2025v; "Musa points to inconsistencies in Budna's account". 7News. 5 September 2025.; 7News 2025v; Silva 2025a; News 5 2025ac; News 5 2025y; News 5 2025ad; "Musa backs independent Budna probe, a first for Belize". News 5. 30 September 2025.; 7News 2025ai. Verbatim: "what you might have seen from that video footage [surveillance footage leaked on 3 September] yesterday is a police officer coming to the scene and ... the person [kidnapper] then tells him [police] to leave. And so that has created a huge question. And so the Prime Minister has said that after receiving the investigative report from the Police Department, he will review it and decide whether or not we need to have an independent investigation. My personal take on it – and I’ve mentioned it to the Prime Minister – I think, regardless of the outcome of the investigation by police, because of the interest in this particular case, in terms of openness and transparency, it warrants an independent investigation" (News 5 2025t; 7News 2025v).) and stating his support for the tapes' release. (Note: News 5 2025y; Love News 2025l; Silva 2025a; News 5 2025ac; News 5 2025y. Verbatim: "It won’t, in my opinion, ruin the integrity of the [ongoing police] investigation to have these footage leaks [the 3 September 7News surveillance leaks]. So, by all means, release the footage, high resolution recording as well ... at this point there’s already [been] a release of the footage ... So might as well release the original one" (News 5 2025y).)

==== Police reports ====
On 4 September, the PM (Briceno) directed the Home Minister (Musa) to update his office on the case by the ensuing day. (Note: News 5 2025r; "PM Briceno demands police report on Budna's kidnapping". News 5. 4 September 2025.; BBN 2025e; 7News 2025r; Centroamérica360 2025a; Love News 2025h; News 5 2025t; News 5 2025v; Love News 2025k; Amandala 2025h; Caribbean Times 2025a; Love News 2025m; News 5 2025ac. Reportedly due to the surveillance tape leak (News 5 2025r), though the PM claimed he had "not had a chance to see the video" (News 5 2025r; 7News 2025r; Caribbean Times 2025a). The PM added, "once I get that report [from Home Affairs], we could take the next step forward, and I am telling you right now, if there is the need to name an independent investigation, I will do it – my government will do. This was not sanctioned by the government of Belize. We have nothing to do with it" (News 5 2025r; 7News 2025r; Love News 2025h; Caribbean Times 2025a; Love News 2025m).) On 8 September, the PM confirmed timely receipt (on 5 September) of the preliminary police report on "the Budna matter". It was found "to be incomplete and, therefore, unsatisfactory". (Note: Press Office 2025d; News 5 2025aa; 7News 2025x; 7News 2025y; Reporter 2025e; Silva 2025b; Love News 2025m; News 5 2025y; Caribbean National Weekly 2025a; Suriname Times 2025; Jamaica Gleaner 2025; Caribbean Times 2025b; San Pedro Sun 2025a; News 5 2025ad. News 5, citing "sources close to the matter", alleged the report was a two-page document lacking key findings, supporting evidence, and interviews of key witnesses (News 5 2025z; News 5 2025ad).) Consequently, the Commissioner (Rosado) was directed to take an immediate 45-day leave of absence, (Note: Press Office 2025d; News 5 2025aa; 7News 2025x; Reporter 2025e; Silva 2025b; Love News 2025m; News 5 2025ab; News 5 2025ac; Caribbean National Weekly 2025a; Suriname Times 2025; Jamaica Gleaner 2025; Caribbean Times 2025b; San Pedro Sun 2025a; News 5 2025ad. Leave deemed "proper and proportionate" due to "the high level of public interest in this matter, as well as the grave allegations made against the Police Department and the incomplete investigative report" (Press Office 2025d). DCP Bart Jones appointed Acting Commissioner of Police for leave's duration (Press Office 2025d).) PC Barrington Flowers was placed on interdiction, (Note: Press Office 2025d; News 5 2025aa; 7News 2025x; Reporter 2025e; Silva 2025b; Love News 2025m; News 5 2025ab; Caribbean National Weekly 2025a; Jamaica Gleaner 2025; 7News 2025z; San Pedro Sun 2025a; 7News 2025ac. From 7 (per Press Office 2025d) or 8 (per News 5 2025an) September, "based upon information gathered in the preliminary investigative report" (Press Office 2025d). Amended to suspension on 3 October (News 5 2025an; "Barrington Gilbert Mai (aka 'Barry Flowers') removed from interdiction and placed on full-pay suspension amid ongoing investigation". BBN. 24 October 2025.; "Budna kidnapping suspect PC Flowers placed on suspension, not interdiction". 7News. 24 October 2025.; News 5 2026ay; Amandala 2026k).) and DCP Suzette Anderson was tasked with completing the police investigation into the kidnapping. (Note: Press Office 2025d; News 5 2025aa; 7News 2025x; Reporter 2025e; Love News 2025m; News 5 2025y; Caribbean National Weekly 2025a; Jamaica Gleaner 2025; Caribbean Times 2025b; San Pedro Sun 2025a; "PM too busy to answer questions on Budna". 7News. 19 September 2025.; News 5 2025ah. Tasked with "submitting a complete report by the end of this [September 2025] month" for PM and Cabinet to "act swiftly on its recommendations" (Press Office 2025d).) This was deemed a tepid response by some (Opposition, press, Budna, the public). (Note: "Opposition slams PM over handling of Budna investigation". Love News. 8 September 2025.; "Opposition Leader demands transparency in Budna abduction case; immediate removal of ComPol Rosado". BBN. 8 September 2025.; News 5 2025z; "From Guate prison, Budna rejects PM's plan". 7News. 8 September 2025.; "U.D.P. demands answers on Budna abduction scandal". News 5. 8 September 2025.; Silva 2025b; "UDP demands more from government in Budna case". 7News. 8 September 2025.; News 5 2025y; "Barrow slams Budna abduction, demands independent inquiry". News 5. 9 September 2025.; "Former PM Barrow questions PM Briceno on Budna abduction". News 5. 9 September 2025.; "Streets say ComPol shady, release the tapes in Budna case". 7News. 9 September 2025.; "Former PM Barrow: Belizeans deserve truth on Budna". News 5. 9 September 2025.; Caribbean Times 2025b; San Pedro Sun 2025a; News 5 2025ad; "Opposition pressures for independent investigation in Budna case". News 5. 15 September 2025. On 12 September, Home Minister ("Police Minister confident in ACP Anderson investigation". 7News. 12 September 2025.; "PM rejected his suggestions on Budna investigation, how does Musa feel?". 7News. 12 September 2025.; 7News 2025aa; "Minister Kareem Musa supports independent investigation into Joseph Budna abduction; will meet with Prime Minister to clarify position". BBN. 14 September 2025.; 7News 2025ai) and PM ("Why did PM Briceno not order an independent investigation?". News 5. 12 September 2025.; "PM Briceno says he won't interfere in Budna investigation". Love News. 12 September 2025.; News 5 2025ae; "Opposition Leader challenges PM to make investigation transparent". 7News. 12 September 2025.; "P.M. confirms independent investigation into Budna abduction remains possible pending complete police report". BBN. 14 September 2025.; 7News 2025ai; "Budna case sparks heated debate in National Assembly". Love News. 12 September 2025.) proferred responses and additional comments (including in Parliament). On 16 September, PM offered further comments in a public State of the Nation address ("Prime Minister addresses Budna abduction in State of the Nation speech: 'Justice will prevail'". BBN. 16 September 2025.; "PM: GOB not involved in Budna abduction, but did he ask his ministers?". 7News. 16 September 2025.). On 18 September ("Bart Jones, Acting ComPol, says it's not his first rodeo". 7News. 18 September 2025.), Acting Commissioner (Bart Jones) offered first public comments. On 19 ("Acting ComPol confident in police investigation of Budna abduction". 7News. 19 September 2025.; News 5 2025ag; News 5 2025ah) and 24 ("Have police gathered all footage of alleged Budna kidnapping?". News 5. 24 September 2025.; "Bart Jones believes Budna investigation going smoothly". News 5. 24 September 2025.) September, Acting Commissioner offered further comments.)

On 30 September, ACP (formerly DCP) Anderson submitted her completed report to the PM, making two recommendations (that an independent investigation be conducted, and that certain police officers be gagged (Note: Press Office 2025e; BBN 2025h; BBN 2025i; Reporter 2025f; Love News 2025o; News 5 2025ai; Caribbean National Weekly 2025b; Caribbean Times 2025c; San Pedro Sun 2025b; Amandala 2025i. Those "assigned to this Inquiry [police investigation of alleged Budna kidnapping]", so as "to safeguard the integrity of the said Inquiry in the event that the matter is addressed in a court of law" (Press Office 2025e).)), both accepted by Cabinet, (Note: Press Office 2025e; 7News 2025ae; BBN 2025i; Reporter 2025f; Love News 2025o; Caribbean National Weekly 2025b; Caribbean Times 2025c; Amandala 2025i. Referred to AG (Anthony Sylvestre) for guidance (Press Office 2025e).) and finding no evidence implicating Commissioner Rosado (whose immediate return from leave was therefore requested and accepted). This was likewise deemed inadequate by some (Opposition, press, Bradley, Saldivar). (Note: News 5 2025ai; "Opposition slams government's handling of Budna kidnapping inquiry". News 5. 30 September 2025.; "Opposition calls out government over Budna report and Rosado reinstatement". Love News. 1 October 2025.; "Leader of the Opposition says Cabinet's statement on Budna's case is 'sham' and 'insult' to Belizeans". BBN. 1 October 2025.; "UDP condemns Cabinet release". 7News. 1 October 2025.; "Opposition slams PM over secretive Budna investigation". News 5. 1 October 2025.; "Briceno built up a firewall around Rosado". 7News. 1 October 2025.; "Attorney questions lack of charges in Budna abduction case". News 5. 2 October 2025.; "Pressure mounts on government to release Joseph Budna surveillance footage". Love News. 2 October 2025.; 7News 2025af; News 5 2025aj; Amandala 2025i; "UDP calls PUP administration a national disgrace after Rosado's reinstatement". Amandala. 5 October 2025.; "Opposition leader questions sincerity behind investigation into abduction of Belizean national". Caribbean Times. 6 October 2025.; News 5 2025ak; "Kidnapping is a crime punishable by life in prison". 7News. 9 October 2025.; News 5 2025al; 7News 2025ag; News 5 2025am. By 2 October, report had not been forwarded to DPP, despite a 16 September statement by PM: "once the police make the report to me, they will recommend and say, 'Prime Minister, there’s evidence.' If there is any evidence of wrongdoing, it needs to go to the DPP" (Amandala 2025i). On 6 October, Home Minister offered responses and additional comments ("Police Minister: No Rosado link in Budna kidnapping". News 5. 6 October 2025.; "Prime Minister did not show Budna investigation to Cabinet, he read it to them". 7News. 6 October 2025.; "Minister talks about Rosado's return". 7News. 6 October 2025.; "Will the public ever see the Budna surveillance videos?". 7News. 6 October 2025.; "Cabinet reviews Budna report as pressure mounts for outside investigator". News 5. 6 October 2025.; "Rosado returns, what about constable Barry Flowers?". 7News. 6 October 2025.; "Who does Musa want to conduct an independent investigation?". 7News. 6 October 2025.; News 5 2025ak; "Return of top cop raises questions". 7News. 7 October 2025.; 7News 2025ai). On 17 October, Opposition brought up the matter in Parliament, with MPs donning shirts reading Who thief Budna? ("His Majesty's Loyal Opposition asks House of Reps: 'Who thief Budna?'". BBN. 17 October 2025.; "Opposition's 'Who thief Budna' shirts stir debate". News 5. 17 October 2025.; "Senator Courtenay says UDP loves Budna, he doesn't". 7News. 20 October 2025.; "Calls for Joseph Budna independent investigation continue". BBN. 21 October 2025.; "Leader of Opposition says 'kidnapping of Budna is threat to national sovereignty'". BBN. 22 October 2025.; "Senator Faber takes stand for Budna's rights, calls Courtenay 'sissy'". 7News. 23 October 2025.; "PUP senator said UDP". 7News. 23 October 2025.; "Calls grow for independent Budna investigation". News 5. 23 October 2025.).) On 27 October, the PM revealed the Attorney General (Anthony Sylvestre) had advised Cabinet that there was no statutory provision for a criminal investigation not led by police, such that the earlier decision to have an independent investigation had been reversed, with the PM now leaning towards forwarding the case to the Director of Public Prosecutions (Cheryl-Lynn Vidal) instead (agreed to by Cabinet the next day). This, too, was ill received by some (press, Trade Union Congress). (Note: BBN 2025j; Love News 2025q; 7News 2025ai; "NTUCB asks what happened to Budna's independent investigation". 7News. 5 November 2025.; Silva 2026e. 7News conceded the AG's point, but noted "there was also no law for a 'special prosecutor' who would work independently of the DPP in the Ramnarace murder prosecution - but one was still appointed to the list of law officers of the Crown" (7News 2025ah). Others echoed this point (BBN 2025j). On 3 November, Cabinet member (Henry Usher) offered responses and additional comments ("Budna abduction investigation back with police amid scrutiny". News 5. 3 November 2025.; "GOB insists that DPP is the right place for the Budna case". 7News. 3 November 2025.; "GOB on why there can't be an independent investigation into Budna kidnapping". 7News. 3 November 2025.; "Minister rejects cover-up characterization of Budna investigation". 7News. 3 November 2025.; "GOB explains why independent Budna investigation isn't possible under law". BBN. 4 November 2025.). On 12 December, AG offered further comments ("AG says only police can investigate Budna abduction". 7News. 12 December 2025.).)

On 12 November, the DPP confirmed receipt of the Anderson report, noting there was "less than nothing" of substance in the file, (Note: Love News 2025r; News 5 2025ap; BBN 2025k; News 5 2025aq; 7News 2025ak; 7News 2025al; News 5 2025ar; 7News 2025am; News 5 2025at; 7News 2025ao. Verbatim: "It is not a thin file. I, too, was expecting a thin file. It is not a thin file. I was also expecting, and I apologise, as Director [DPP], for saying this, but I was also expecting that there would have been nothing [that warrants immediate action eg an arrest] in the file. What I was not expecting was that there would be less than nothing in the file, which is really my characterisation of what has been put before me ... Based on what was sent to me, at this very moment there cannot possibly be an arrest" (Love News 2025r; News 5 2025ap; BBN 2025k; News 5 2025aq; 7News 2025ak; 7News 2025al). On 14 November, PM stated DPP's comments were "quite disappointing" (News 5 2025ar), adding "I felt differently [about the report]" (News 5 2025ar), whilst Budna expressed disappointment with the police investigation itself, noting "The Prime Minister is not an investigator ... He should have never put his hand on the file [gotten directly involved in the case] ... You [the PM] made the situation worse because now you guys sent less than nothing to the DPP" (7News 2025al). Home Minister later echoed PM ("Musa still doesn't know who 'teef' Budna". 7News. 20 November 2025.). PM later reiterated disappointment (News 5 2025ax; 7News 2025aw). DPP later reiterated comments ("we have a file that does not implicate anyone in anything"; BBN 2025n). Commissioner later echoed PM (News 5 2026ay; "DPP said file had less than nothing, ComPol doesn't agree". 7News. 12 January 2026.; News 5 2026az). Saldivar later echoed Budna ("DPP should have been the only one that the file went to"; News 5 2026bb).) but that her team were nonetheless still working out next steps. (Note: Love News 2025r; News 5 2025ap; News 5 2025aq; 7News 2025ak; 7News 2025al; News 5 2025ar. On 12 November, 7News speculated the DPP Office were "already conducting their own investigative probes in an attempt to gather enough evidence to bring charges", citing "reliable reports" (7News 2025ak).) On 10 December, the PM tentatively called the kidnapping a "crime", (Note: 7News 2025av. Verbatim: "[it] seems there was a crime that could have been committed" (7News 2025av).) and strongly criticised Budna ("a monster") and the press ("sensational"). (Note: And defended government's handling of the case (News 5 2025av; News 5 2025aw), and reiterated their non-involvement in the kidnapping (News 5 2025av). Verbatim: "The media, being sensational on this story, forgets that this guy is a monster. I mean, I did not see any of you out there crying out when the 16-year-old was mistakenly killed when he was in the bedroom with Mr Budna, or when Mr Budna had raped young boys. I didn’t hear any of you all out there crying out loud for justice for those people, but yet you are crying for justice for Mr Budna" (News 5 2025av; News 5 2025aw). Echoed by former Home Minister on 28 January 2026 ("we're talking here about a very dangerous individual [Budna]. And yes, so many vulnerable children are now safe, safer because he's no longer on the streets of Belize"; 7News 2026bd, News 5 2026bc).)

==== Cover-up speculation ====
On 2 December, 7News revealed they had "received multiple credible reports of police officers being induced to give false statements which ended up in the 'less than nothing' file [Anderson report] that was sent to the DPP". (Note: 7News 2025ao; 7News 2025ar. In one instance, 7News reported a "complaint [against two Orange Walk police officers for soliciting a bribe on 24 September] was being kept on the back burner to protect one of the officers so that he would collude in the Budna kidnapping cover up by giving one of those 'less than nothing' statements to investigators" (7News 2025at). In another, 7News contended the on-duty diarist (who recorded the first eyewitness report to police) "was also directed to a senior officer's home where she was presented with a [bogus] statement to sign" (7News 2025av).) The next day, news broke of an anonymous GI3 constable (later identified as Gabriel Pou) seeking to challenge their 3 November transfer to the police station in Mahogany Heights, Belize, alleging the move was punitive given they had "specific, incriminating information concerning high-ranking individuals involved in the highly sensitive Budna kidnapping matter". (Note: BBN 2025m; News 5 2025au; 7News 2025ar; Amandala 2025j; 7News 2026ba; Amandala 2026k. Transfer meant loss of $880 per month in specialised allowances (BBN 2025m; Amandala 2025j), and possible career derailment (News 5 2025au; 7News 2025ar; Amandala 2025j). On 8 December, Home Minister ("Cop says Compol transferred him as an act of malice, Min. Mira says it's just procedure". 7News. 8 December 2025.; Amandala 2025j) and Commissioner (Amandala 2025j) defended the transfer. Commissioner later reiterated defence (Love News 2026s).) On 9 December, reports surfaced of a second officer (sergeant Joel Grinage) seeking to challenge their transfer to Roaring Creek, Cayo (allegedly ordered after they had "made contact with a key officer involved in the Budna cover up", per 7News). The next day, 7News obtained an audio recording allegedly featuring corporal Carlos Choco (now identified as the on-duty officer who responded to the kidnapping in progress) confiding to a colleague about how he was urged to give investigators a false statement. (Note: 7News 2025as; 7News 2025av. Allegedly, Choco first gave a true statement (that he saw three officers beating Budna on the ground, that PC Flowers told him they were on a mission for a senior officer, that Choco therefore went about his business and got a concerned onlooker to do the same; 7News 2025as), but was then made to give a second one (that he did not recognise the kidnappers) by a senior officer (7News 2025as). Allegedly, Choco disclosed the unlawful request to another senior officer (Cowo) who advised against complying (7News 2025as). Cowo told press, "I totally refute all allegations and insinuations of misconduct that are alleged to have been made against me" (7News 2025as). 7News further reported that disciplinary charges against Choco (for soliciting a bribe on 24 September; 7News 2025at, 7News 2025au) had seemingly been dropped by 10 December (7News 2025au). On 11 December, 7News "received confirmed evidence" that the Orange Walk diarist on duty on 22–23 August was likewise "made to give a bogus, second statement" (7News 2025av).) When asked about a possible cover-up on 12 December, the PM stated, "it could be [that there is one], it could not be, I don’t know. I’ve not spoken to them [alleged whistleblowers], but I believe that’s something that, probably, the Commissioner of Police would be in a better position to answer [address]". (Note: News 5 2025ax; 7News 2025aw. On 12 December, AG echoed PM ("AG sticks to the script: 'No state kidnapping'". 7News. 12 December 2025.).) The DPP, on the other hand, revealed on 17 December that they were now looking at perversion of justice charges. (Note: 7News 2025ax; BBN 2025n. Verbatim: "We are looking towards charges, not just for the persons directly involved in the kidnapping, but for the persons who tried to get individuals to give false statements, or those who actually gave false statements" (7News 2025ax). Asked whether a crime was committed, DPP stated, "Obviously a crime has been committed. I don't believe there is any doubt in relation to whether or not a crime has been committed" ("DPP has no illusion about crime of Budna's abduction". 7News. 17 December 2025.; 7News 2026az). She added, "we are at the point where we have a file [Anderson report] that does not implicate anyone in anything, and we have to ensure that we get it to the point where the truth can be told ... What we need to confirm beyond a reasonable doubt is who was involved in that crime, not just the actors as in the ones who detained him against his will. But why did they do it? Where did the instruction come from, or how did the plan originate to do it? This is, this is what we have to look at" (BBN 2025n).) On 12 January 2026, the Commissioner declined to comment, but encouraged potential whistleblowers "to come forward". (Note: News 5 2026ay; Love News 2026s; News 5 2026az; 7News 2026az; 7News 2026ba; Amandala 2026k. Verbatim: "if you have any information that has evidential value, [I encourage you] to come forward and speak to the investigators so that we can continue the ongoing investigation" (News 5 2026ay; Love News 2026s; 7News 2026ba). This was the first time Commissioner made himself available to press in months (News 5 2026az) or since 25 August 2025 (7News 2025ay; 7News 2026az; Amandala 2026k), though he rejected claims he had been avoiding press ("ComPol Rosado: 'I am not avoiding the media'". News 5. 12 January 2026.). Pou's legal team called the comments "disingenuous and misleading" (7News 2026ba; News 5 2026ba; Love News 2026t; 7News 2026bb). Commissioner again declined to comment on 2 February 2026 ("ComPol won't budge on Budna pronouncements". 7News. 2 February 2026.).) On 19 January, the PM urged them to "either step up or shut up". (Note: News 5 2026ba; Love News 2026t; 7News 2026bb; BBN 2026o. Verbatim: "If officer Pou is making those allegations, then he needs to go to the DPP ... I think he should stop just hurling these accusations. He [should] either step up or shut up ... he tried to meet with me. I was unable to meet with him, but I would rather stay away from these things. Go to DPP" (News 5 2026ba; Love News 2026t; 7News 2026bb; BBN 2026o). Later echoed by former Home Minister ("Musa backs PM call for PC Pou to take claims to DPP". Love News. 22 January 2026.).)

==== Litigation ====
On 4 September, a team of lawyers (led by Arthur Saldivar) announced their intention to sue on behalf of Budna. (Note: News 5 2025r; Caribbean Times 2025a; Caribbean National Weekly 2025a; Jamaica Gleaner 2025. Saldivar stated, "We saw the video [surveillance footage leaked on 3 September] ... We saw one police officer who, by his omission to act, implicated the Department in what occurred with Mr Budna. So the Police Department is responsible for a Belizean citizen being spirited away in an illegal and extrajudicial manner to a country that claims us ... It is sad that this is where we are" (News 5 2025r; Caribbean Times 2025a).) They filed suit in the High Court on 16 September. (Note: "Ryan Joseph Budna files major lawsuit against government authorities for alleged constitutional violations". BBN. 17 September 2025.; 7News 2025ab; Love News 2025n; News 5 2025af; "Foreign Minister not surprised by Budna interview". 7News. 18 September 2025.; Silva 2025c; News 5 2025ag; "Andrew Munnings and Joseph Budna are suing GoB". Amandala. 21 September 2025.; 7News 2025ag; News 5 2025am; News 5 2026bb; 7News 2026bc; Silva 2026e. On 15 October, Salvidar noted they had not gotten access to surveillance tapes, adding "those who have or may have had access to the videos are afraid to release them" ("Budna's attorney also can't get original surveillance videos". 7News. 15 October 2025.). Ditto by 23 January 2026 ("Budna attorney calls for GOB to release footage". 7News. 23 January 2026.). Prompted on why they had to sue, Saldivar stated, "This [Budna] is not somebody who was difficult to render legally to that foreign country [Guatemala], if that was the [defendants'] desire. They did not have to break the law to do it. That is all I am saying here. I don't want to be here ... having to have this matter be brought before the court like this, but I am compelled to do it, because it could happen to any one of you or your relatives. If it took that [a kidnapping] to get someone who already had a conviction, what would they do to silence somebody who has nothing [no convictions] against them?" (7News 2026bc).) On 12 November and 22 January 2026, the defendants moved to strike out the case.

On 8 September, police sergeants Gary Myvett and Phillip Thomas threatened defamation suits against Moses Barrow and 7News for alleging they had been involved in the kidnapping. On 28 January 2026, the former Home Minister (Musa) likewise threatened to sue several media houses for airing allegedly defamatory statements by Budna's counsel (Saldivar).

== Legacy ==
As of February 2026: Joseph Budna remains in Guatemalan custody awaiting criminal trial; his civil suit in Belize is ongoing; the DPP's investigation is ongoing, with no charges laid so far. As of the same date, this case is popularly (unofficially) suspected of being a state-sponsored extrajudicial extradition (though no court of law has so labelled it), likened to the 25 April 2003 extradition of George Herbert to the US (ruled unlawful by the High Court later that year). (Note: "In 2004, GOB extrajudicially extradited George Herbert, and paid for it". 7News. 29 August 2025.; News 5 2025af; Silva 2025c; 7News 2025aj; "AG says Budna constitutional lawsuit like George Herbert's". 7News. 12 December 2025. By November 2025, Herbert filed suit to enforce the Court's 2003 judgment, alleging the Said Musa government (and subsequent ones) failed to do so (7News 2025aj).) Most commentators have emphatically condemned the kidnapping. (Note: The Reporter said, "what we will say firmly, however, is that the State has a duty to respond decisively to such a gross violation of rights ... The Budna case is not just about one man. It is about the principle that no citizen should be beaten and carried away in full view of the public, much less within steps of a police station. It is about reaffirming that Belize is governed by laws, not by force" (Reporter 2025d). The National Perspective added, "what happened in the heart of Orange Walk looks like an abduction with police involvement or acquiescence — and a cross-border handover without due process ... If this is normalised, Belize signals that constitutional rights (ss. 5–7 [Constitution Act 1981]) are optional when a citizen is inconvenient. That endangers all Belizeans and corrodes sovereignty by encouraging off-the-books cross-border 'solutions'" (Silva 2025a).) A few have condemned it less forcefully. (Note: A Reporter writer opined, "while we may mourn for the way in which he [Budna] was returned to Guatemala to rightfully face the rest of his sentence, the Guatemalans or whoever took him may have actually done us a favour ... it may not be legal, but his kidnapping settles scores" (Reporter 2025c).) The case has elicited substantial and sustained interest from officials, civil society, press, and the public at large. It has notably led to the Foreign Ministry's first efforts at a prisoner swap with Guatemala, (Note: Love News 2025j. Since 2014 signing of a bilateral agreement for such (Love News 2025j).) and the first suspension of a Commissioner of Police. (Note: 7News 2025x; Love News 2025m; News 5 2025ab; San Pedro Sun 2025a; News 5 2025ae; Love News 2025p. Since 1886 founding of Police Department ("About us". BPD. 27 July 2025.).)

The case brought attention to the 21 February 2023 kidnapping of Sebastian Pop, a 22 year old Belizean national allegedly abducted from Dolores, Toledo by a mob of Guatemalan vigilantes to face criminal charges in Peten or Alta Verapaz. His father (Francisco Pop) filed a police report in July 2023, but there had allegedly been no progress with that as of August 2025, by which time Pop had been convicted of femicide by a Guatemalan court after allegedly receiving no consular support. (Note: 7News 2025n; News 5 2025p; Love News 2025f. Family alleged they were repeatedly ignored by police and the Foreign Ministry (News 5 2025p; Love News 2025f; 7News 2025p). The Foreign Minister (Francis Fonseca) alleged they only became aware of the matter in August 2025 (Love News 2025f; Amandala 2025g). The PM (John Briceno) reiterated Fonseca's claim ("Cross-border abductions expose gaps in Belize's protection". News 5. 4 September 2025.; "PM says Pop family failed to inform government". 7News. 4 September 2025.; "Briceno slams illegal abductions amid Pop case questions". News 5. 4 September 2025.; "PM Briceno says government was unaware of Sebastian Pop's cross-border capture". Love News. 5 September 2025.). Pop was sentenced on 24 August 2024 to 30 years' prison for the 7 February 2023 rape and murder of his female cousin in San Luis, Peten (7News 2025p; Amandala 2025h). By August 2025, family alleged it had been "two and a half years of knowing nothing" of Pop (7News 2025p), with his sister (Candelaria Pop) commenting on the "devastating toll" this had on them: "It destroyed my whole family ... My mom, like, I don't know what happened to her – too much stress, too much worry ... Every day I cry. I get sick of it, thinking about him. He's not an animal. My brother was tortured very badly ... he [their father] can't sleep; he can't eat, and he's sleepless in the night" (7News 2025p).) The Foreign Ministry confirmed they were monitoring the case on 29 August, expressing "extreme concern" and pledging to "vigorously pursue [Pop's] repatriation". (Note: Press Office 2025c; News 5 2025p; Love News 2025f; 7News 2025p; Amandala 2025h. That day, the Minister personally assured 7News he would follow up on this case, adding, "if this were not a poor man from a rural community, I am sure it would not have fallen through the cracks of the Government bureaucracy" (7News 2025p). Pledge reiterated on 3 September ("Sebastian Pop's case resurfaces after Budna saga". News 5. 3 September 2025.; "Foreign Affairs Ministry works on the repratriation of Sebastian Pop". Love News. 3 September 2025.; "Foreign Minister explains saddening case of Sebastian Pop". 7News. 3 September 2025.; Love News 2025j).)

The case has furthermore been linked by some to: the government-proposed Thirteenth Amendment to the Constitution Act 1981; (Note: The Trade Union Congress stated, "the proposed Thirteenth Amendment ... which seeks to validate past state of emergency actions and broaden the powers of law enforcement under 'special area' declarations, would open the door to legalising precisely the type of unlawful measures witnessed in this incident [Budna kidnapping]" (News 5 2025u).) the November 2025 removal of Kareem Musa as Minister of Home Affairs (in a cabinet reshuffle); (Note: "Leader of the Opposition says Kareem Musa is the fall guy in the Budna saga". Love News. 12 November 2025.; News 5 2025as; "Panton calls Home Affairs reshuffle 'purely cosmetic'". News 5. 14 November 2025.; "Opposition Leader says Cabinet reshuffle signals 'trouble' inside Briceno administration". News 5. 14 November 2025.; Silva 2025d; "From behind bars, Budna blasts Mai". 7News. 2 December 2025. PM denied alleged ties to the case (News 5 2025as; Silva 2025d). Oscar Mira accepted portfolio on 17 November, stating, "I have not seen any footage. I have not seen any file. As I said, I won’t interfere with the investigation that has happened or is happening. I will not interfere with what[ever] the DPP’s direction is going to be. I don’t want to influence anything. So I will leave it to the DPP for her to give her directions on this case" ("Mira stays cautious on Budna case as pressure builds". Love News. 17 November 2025.; News 5 2025at; "Oscar Mira faces crime fighting and Budna fallout". News 5. 20 November 2025.). Elton Bennett accepted chief executive post on 16 December, stating, "Indeed it [Budna kidnapping] is the most present issue that we will have to face as a Ministry ... what I can say now is the investigation is in the hands of the DPP" ("Bennett steps in as CEO, commits to openness in Budna investigation". News 5. 16 December 2025.; 7News 2025ay).) a November 2025 US travel ban on the Officer Commanding the Police Department's SPU (Aaron Gamboa). (Note: BBN 2025l; 7News 2025an; "US turns away Gambis, Special Patrol Unit's boss". News 5. 24 November 2025. Per Gamboa himself (BBN 2025l; 7News 2025an).)

== See also ==
- List of cases of police brutality in Belize
- List of political scandals in Belize

== Notes and references ==
=== References ===
1. "Police beat up two women in San Ignacio Town?". Amandala. 12 March 2010.
2. "Budna busted with weed, cops say". 7News. 18 May 2011.
3. "The dramatic Mr. Budna alleges police violations". 7News. 7 November 2011.
4. "Guatemala police kill man who threatened Joseph Budna". News 5. 8 May 2012.
5. "The Budna chronicles: Joseph Budna detained in Guatemala". News 5. 6 September 2012.
6. "Guats: Budna is an international kidnapper wanted by FBI". 7News. 7 September 2012.
7. "Belizean accused of kidnapping after Guatemalan arrest". Ambergris Today. 7 September 2012.
8. "Joseph Budna gets another 30 years for kidnapping". News 5. 14 May 2014.
9. "Joseph Budna, prisoner in Guatemala, claims he was beaten because he is Belizean". Guardian. 28 April 2016. Archived from the original on 1 May 2016.
10. "Was Joseph Budna a target of irate Guatemalans?". Belize Times. No. 4991. 1 May 2016. p. 23.
11. "Budna recaptured in Belize". Amandala. 13 July 2019.
12. "Budna explains his arrest and release in Belize". News 5. 15 July 2019.
13. "Guatemalan escapee Budna, free in the Land of the Free". 7News. 15 July 2019.
14. "Joseph Budna involved in fatal shooting in San Ignacio". Love News. 21 August 2023.
15. "Commissioner of Police on Joseph Budna". Love News. 21 August 2023.
16. "Freelance 'journalist' Joseph Budna charged in 2021 Belmopan murder". Love News. 29 July 2024.
17. "Blogger Joseph Budna remanded over cyberbullying charges". Love News. 2 June 2025.
18. "Controversial 'journalist' locked up for cyberbullying". Amandala. 8 June 2025.
19. "Budna fined for cybercrime, received bail for previous charges". 7News. 10 June 2025.
20. "Police investigate Orange Walk 'incident' as Joseph Budna allegedly kidnapped". BBN. 23 August 2025.
21. "Police investigate 'incident' near Hospital Crescent in OW". News 5. 23 August 2025.
22. "Belize Police Department Investigates Incident Involving Mr. Ryan Joseph Budna" (Press release). 24 August 2025.
23. "ComPol Rosado says police investigating Joseph Budna's 'apprehension' by Guatemala; confirms witness made report after alleged kidnapping". BBN. 24 August 2025.
24. "Opposition Leader demands answers over Budna's detention". News 5. 24 August 2025.
25. "Guatemalan authorities silent on how Budna was detained". News 5. 24 August 2025.
26. "UDP leader raises alarm over Budna's detention". News 5. 24 August 2025.
27. "Statement by the Ministry of Foreign Affairs" (Press release). 25 August 2025. PR#156-25.
28. "From fugitive to prisoner: The return of Joseph Budna". News 5. 25 August 2025.
29. "Police Commissioner urges patience as Budna investigation continues". Love News. 25 August 2025.
30. "The Book of Budna is full of drama". 7News. 25 August 2025.
31. "Livestream leads to Budna's kidnapping". News 5. 25 August 2025.
32. "Citizen journalist Budna spirited over into Guatemala – he says cops did it". 7News. 25 August 2025.
33. "Foreign Affairs engages Guatemala on Budna case". Reporter. 25 August 2025.
34. "Police were 'diverted' by early Budna leads; Commissioner denies personal or Departmental involvement in alleged abduction". BBN. 25 August 2025.
35. "Capturan en Petén a beliceño Joseph Ryan Budna condenado por secuestro y fugado en dos ocasiones". Prensa Libre. 25 August 2025.
36. "Budna caught on camera before vanishing". News 5. 25 August 2025.
37. "Budna's mother says government wanted him gone". 7News. 25 August 2025.
38. "Prime Minister: 'We would never sanction abduction of Belizean citizens'". BBN. 25 August 2025.
39. "Was it an extrajudicial extradition? Compol says police not involved". 7News. 25 August 2025.
40. "PM says state did not sanction Budna's effective extradition". 7News. 25 August 2025.
41. "Controversial figure Joseph Budna detained in Guatemala". News 5. 26 August 2025.
42. "ComPol's account of Budna kidnapping has inconsistencies". 7News. 26 August 2025.
43. "Budna speaks again from Guatemalan detention". 7News. 26 August 2026.
44. "ComPol: Checkpoint records don't match Budna's story". News 5. 26 August 2026.
45. "Was it an extra-judicial extradition? Jules weighs in". 7News. 26 August 2025.
46. "Was Budna abducted and trafficked to Guatemala?". Amandala. 27 August 2025.
47. "Budna's mother speaks out six days after he was abducted". News 5. 27 August 2025.
48. "Budna calls out to Opposition for help". 7News. 27 August 2025.
49. "He was abducted by Guatemalan mob two years ago, and no one did anything". 7News. 27 August 2025.
50. "Piecing together the Orange Walk abduction of Joseph Budna". 7News. 28 August 2025.
51. "News Five presses police for answers, transparency in Budna's case". News 5. 28 August 2025.
52. "News Five demands release of security footage in Budna case". News 5. 28 August 2025.
53. "Belize monitors case of abducted national convicted in Guatemala". News 5. 29 August 2025.
54. "Foreign Affairs probe into the 2023 case of Sebastian Pop taken to a Guatemalan prison". Love News. 29 August 2025.
55. "Statement by the Ministry of Foreign Affairs" (Press release). 29 August 2025. PR#162-25.
56. "Pop got 30 years for femicide, GOB will 'vigorously pursue his repatriation'". 7News. 29 August 2025.
57. "Could Orange Walk OC have the key to Budna investigation?". 7News. 2 September 2025.
58. "Belize monitors Joseph Budna's detention as embassy conducts prison visit". Love News. 3 September 2025.
59. "Belize officials speak with Joseph Budna". News 5. 3 September 2025.
60. "Budna's account matches security video". 7News. 3 September 2025.
61. "Surveillance video shows police abducted Budna". 7News. 3 September 2025.
62. "Dysfunction!". Amandala. 3 September 2025.
63. "Belizean officials check on Joseph Budna in Guatemala prison". News 5. 3 September 2025.
64. "PM Briceno demands answers in Budna investigation". News 5. 4 September 2025.
65. "Police Department's report will set stage for next steps in Joseph Budna saga". BBN. 4 September 2025.
66. "7News: Footage shows Budna abduction in Orange Walk". Reporter. 4 September 2025.
67. "PM won't budge on independent investigation into Budna, says he's waiting on special report". 7News. 4 September 2025.
68. "The removal of the citizen journalist". Reporter. 4 September 2025.
69. "Rights cannot be trampled by force". Reporter. 4 September 2025.
70. "Budna's mother demands independent probe, and ComPol's resignation". News 5. 4 September 2025.
71. "The Budna affair: A chilling case of cross-border abduction and institutional failure in Belize". BBN. 4 September 2025.
72. "Rosado says he saw the video, why did he misrepresent it?". 7News. 4 September 2025.
73. "Captura de fugitivo beliceño en Guatemala desata polémica legal y diplomática entre ambos países". Centroamérica360. 4 September 2025.
74. "PM Briceno denies government role in Joseph Budna kidnapping". Love News. 5 September 2025.
75. "Kareem Musa: Budna's rights were violated, probe needed". News 5. 5 September 2025.
76. "UDP calls for release of surveillance footage and independent investigation". BBN. 5 September 2025.
77. "Opposition Leader demands removal of Home Affairs Minister and ComPol over Budna case". Love News. 5 September 2025.
78. "NTUCB condemns 'apparent police complicity' in Budna's abduction". News 5. 5 September 2025.
79. "UDP leader Moses Barrow: 'Release the footage'". News 5. 5 September 2025.
80. "Budna names PC Flowers as one of his abductors". 7News. 5 September 2025.
81. "Media, civil society call for release of surveillance videos and commission of inquiry". 7News. 5 September 2025.
82. "Minister Musa: 'Regardless of outcome, Budna's case warrants independent investigation'". News 5. 5 September 2025.
83. "Pressure mounts on Briceno over Budna abduction". News 5. 5 September 2025.
84. "Leaked surveillance video undermines ComPol's bold claim". News 5. 5 September 2025.
85. "Abductors acted with lawmen's impunity". 7News. 5 September 2025.
86. "Minister says he has not seen police investigators' surveillance videos". 7News. 5 September 2025.
87. "Musa calls for surveillance video release, independent probe". News 5. 5 September 2025.
88. "Video shows police complicity, so why did Compol deny it?". 7News. 5 September 2025.
89. "Shyne urges government to pursue Budna's repatriation like Sebastian Pop". Love News. 6 September 2025.
90. "PM awaits report on Budna abduction as calls grow for independent probe". Love News. 6 September 2025.
91. "Musa backs release of Budna kidnapping footage as pressure mounts". Love News. 6 September 2025.
92. Silva O (6 September 2025). "'A stone's throw from the station'". National Perspective Belize.
93. "Budna abduction, citizens' rights & police questions". Amandala. 7 September 2025.
94. "Prime Minister Takes Decisions in the Budna Matter" (Press release). 8 September 2025. PR#169-25.
95. "Glaring omissions in government's response in the Budna matter". News 5. 8 September 2025.
96. "Prime Minister Briceno takes action in Budna investigation". News 5. 8 September 2025.
97. "17 days later, PM responds to Budna abduction, placing ComPol on leave". 7News. 8 September 2025.
98. "PM wants a report into the 'abduction' of a Belizean national". Caribbean Times. 8 September 2025.
99. "Prime Minister directs Police Commissioner to step aside as Budna probe deepens". Reporter. 8 September 2025.
100. Silva O (8 September 2025). "No more shadows: Acting ComPol Bart Jones must release the tapes–or own the consequences". National Perspective Belize.
101. "An analysis of Briceno on Budna". 7News. 8 September 2025.
102. "Prime Minister suspends Police Commissioner for 45 days". Love News. 8 September 2025.
103. "Is this the end of the road for ComPol Rosado?". News 5. 8 September 2025.
104. "The Budna kidnapping investigation timeline". News 5. 9 September 2025.
105. "With Budna investigation, PM ignores positions taken by his Police Minister". 7News. 9 September 2025.
106. "Belize PM sends Police Commissioner on leave amid Budna 'abduction' controversy". Caribbean National Weekly. 9 September 2025.
107. "Belize police commissioner sent on leave after abduction". Times of Suriname. 9 September 2025.
108. "Belize PM sends Police Commissioner on leave with immediate effect". Jamaica Gleaner. 9 September 2025.
109. "Former prime minister wants questions answered regarding 'the abduction' of a Belizean national". Caribbean Times. 10 September 2025.
110. "Barry Flowers signed out a loaded police pistol while on leave". 7News. 11 September 2025.
111. "Budna's long history of trolling ministers". 7News. 11 September 2025.
112. "Commissioner Rosado placed on leave pending full Budna investigation". San Pedro Sun. 12 September 2025.
113. "No suspects, no arrests, no charges in Budna abduction". News 5. 12 September 2025.
114. "Budna abduction videos to be released following investigation". News 5. 12 September 2025.
115. "Why is Barry on interdiction? No one seems to know". 7News. 12 September 2025.
116. "The Joseph Budna case and a nation's broken trust". News 5. 17 September 2025.
117. "Budna sues 11 GOB state actors from Minister & ComPol to cops". 7News. 17 September 2025.
118. "Joseph Budna sues government over alleged kidnapping and expulsion to Guatemala". Love News. 18 September 2025.
119. "Budna sues Government of Belize over alleged abduction and torture". News 5. 18 September 2025.
120. Silva O (19 September 2025). "Budna vs. Belize: Lawsuit over alleged abduction and torture rocks the Briceno government". National Perspective Belize.
121. "Acting Compol defends handling of Budna abduction investigation". News 5. 19 September 2025.
122. "Can Commissioner Rosado influence the Budna investigation?". News 5. 19 September 2025.
123. "Flowers on interdiction for Budna abduction, but does it distract from wider web of wrongdoing?". 7News. 24 September 2025.
124. "Budna's letter from a Guatemala City jail". 7News. 29 September 2025.
125. "Can Compol Rosado rebuild public trust?". 7News. 30 September 2025.
126. "Cabinet Release" (Press release). 30 September 2025. PR#186-25.
127. "Joseph Budna writes from Guatemala City jail; Acting Commissioner not taking part in investigation". BBN. 30 September 2025.
128. "'Who thief Budna?' ACP Anderson says it wasn't COMPOL Rosado; recommends independent investigation; Rosado back on the job effective immediately, Cabinet decides". BBN. 30 September 2025.
129. "PM agrees to independent investigation, reinstates Rosado". 7News. 30 September 2025.
130. "Cabinet approves independent investigation regarding Budna's case; COMPOL Rosado is back!". BBN. 30 September 2025.
131. "Independent investigation ordered in Budna case – Rosado returns". Reporter. 30 September 2025.
132. "Commissioner Rosado reinstated as independent probe launched in Budna case". Love News. 30 September 2025.
133. "ComPol Rosado reinstated; Panton slams move as 'mockery of justice'". News 5. 30 September 2025.
134. "News Director unpacks GOB position on Budna investigation". 7News. 30 September 2025.
135. "Police chief Rosado reinstated after Budna inquiry report delivered to PM". Love News. 1 October 2025.
136. "Belize Police Commissioner Richard Rosado reinstated". Caribbean National Weekly. 1 October 2025.
137. "Police Commissioner returns to his job". Caribbean Times. 1 October 2025.
138. "Dickie demands: Charge police now for Budna abduction". 7News. 2 October 2025.
139. Vernon D (2 October 2025). "Budna, mano dura and the 13th Amendment Bill". Time Come.
140. "What would an independent Budna investigation look like?". News 5. 2 October 2025.
141. "Compol Rosado reinstated; Cabinet recommends independent investigation". San Pedro Sun. 4 October 2025.
142. "Opposition slams GoB on Budna case". Amandala. 5 October 2025.
143. "Budna and the democratic state's nightmare". Amandala. 5 October 2025.
144. "One month later: Key questions in Budna's abduction remain unanswered". News 5. 7 October 2025.
145. "Attorney Bradley flags system failures in Budna investigation". News 5. 14 October 2025.
146. "Budna attorney hopes to have his constitutional challenge heard in November". 7News. 14 October 2025.
147. "Budna's attorney pushes for his return to Belize". News 5. 15 October 2025.
148. "Police officer named in Budna abduction now on full-pay suspension". News 5. 24 October 2025.
149. "PM Briceno: Budna case likely heading to DPP". News 5. 27 October 2025.
150. "PM casually cancels independent investigation into Budna". 7News. 27 October 2025.
151. "No independent investigation into Joseph Budna's alleged abduction: P.M. to recommend sending police file to Director of Public Prosecutions". BBN. 28 October 2025.
152. "Opposition Leader urges focus on Budna kidnapping inquiry". Love News. 28 October 2025.
153. "Police Minister supported independent investigation but PM never really did". 7News. 28 October 2025.
154. "Cabinet Brief" (Press release). 30 October 2025. PR#214-25.
155. "22 years ago the state delivered George Herbert to the DEA, now he wants them to pay for it". 7News. 4 November 2025.
156. "DPP says Budna case file lacks substance". Love News. 12 November 2025.
157. "Budna case before DPP; it exposes gaps in law enforcement". News 5. 12 November 2025.
158. "Candid DPP says Budna investigative file contains 'less than nothing' – not enough for prosecution 'at this time'". BBN. 12 November 2025.
159. "The Budna file: 'A file full of empty words'". News 5. 12 November 2025.
160. "In candid assessment, DPP says police's Budna file contains 'less than nothing'". 7News. 12 November 2025.
161. "83 days later, how police came up with a nothing file in the Budna investigation". 7News. 13 November 2025.
162. "Budna case sparks rift between PM and DPP". News 5. 14 November 2025.
163. "Budna demands the release of his impounded vehicle". 7News. 14 November 2025.
164. "Budna reacts to 'less than nothing' investigative file on his kidnapping". 7News. 14 November 2025.
165. "PM Briceno marks milestone with major ministerial moves". News 5. 14 November 2025.
166. Silva O (16 November 2025). "A Cabinet in chaos: From reshuffle to rebellion". National Perspective Belize.
167. "Newly appointed Police Minister opts to stay out of Budna case". News 5. 18 November 2025.
168. "Aaron Gamboa, senior police officer, denied travel to U.S." BBN. 23 November 2025.
169. "Supt. Gamboa's visa cancelled, who's next?". 7News. 24 November 2025.
170. "The courage to face facts: Belize's call for truth and change". Amandala. 26 November 2025.
171. "Budna urges police who witnessed abduction to do the right thing". 7News. 2 December 2025.
172. "Budna still carrying injuries from kidnapping". 7News. 2 December 2025.
173. "Budna calls out Commander of SPU". 7News. 2 December 2025.
174. "Police constable challenges transfer; alleges abuse of power". BBN. 3 December 2025.
175. "Legal firestorm over police transfer raises accountability questions". News 5. 3 December 2025.
176. "Cop challenges transfer, says he's being victimized because he has dirt on the Budna cover up". 7News. 3 December 2025.
177. "Corporal forced to be part of the Budna cover up now faces internal charges". 7News. 4 December 2025.
178. "Budna kidnapping matter: ComPol's huyu egg?". Amandala. 10 December 2025.
179. "Police witness to Budna kidnapping says they made him give a bogus statement". 7News. 10 December 2025.
180. "Disciplinary charges against Choco suddenly shelved". 7News. 10 December 2025.
181. "PM John Briceno labels Budna a 'monster'". News 5. 10 December 2025.
182. "Briceno slams media coverage, points to Budna's record". News 5. 10 December 2025.
183. "Why the Budna cover-up is falling apart". 7News. 11 December 2025.
184. "PM explains police involvement in Budna investigation". News 5. 12 December 2025.
185. "PM says it's up to DPP to demand deeper investigation into Budna kidnapping". 7News. 12 December 2025.
186. "DPP looking at perversion of justice charges in Budna abduction". 7News. 17 December 2025.
187. "When the people stop believing: How broken trust destroys nations from within". Amandala. 17 December 2025.
188. "PM Briceno eyes transparency law after Budna investigation fallout". News 5. 17 December 2025.
189. "Cabinet discussed 'independent investigator' legislation". News 5. 17 December 2025.
190. "DPP investigating police involvement in Joseph Budna abduction – still needs more evidence". BBN. 18 December 2025.
191. "ComPol is hemorrhaging credibility, is the CEO concerned?". 7News. 24 December 2025.
192. "Former ComPol cautious when speaking about Budna surveillance footage". 7News. 7 January 2026.
193. "Here's an update on the Budna kidnapping case". News 5. 12 January 2026.
194. "Police Commissioner urges Constable Gabriel Pou to share any information on Budna kidnapping". Love News. 12 January 2026.
195. "Police Commissioner defends Budna kidnapping investigation". News 5. 12 January 2026.
196. "Five months later, ComPol Rosado still won't say that a crime occurred in Budna abduction". 7News. 14 January 2026.
197. "Compol challenges Constable Pou, but is he serious?". 7News. 16 January 2026.
198. "COMPOL addresses status of police officers Pou and Flowers". Amandala. 18 January 2026.
199. "Budna case heats up as Pou pushes back". News 5. 19 January 2026.
200. "PM Briceno tells cop Gabriel Pou to report Budna kidnapping claims or step aside". Love News. 19 January 2026.
201. "PM tells cop whistleblower: 'Step up or shut up'". 7News. 19 January 2026.
202. "Prime Minister tells police officer to 'step up or shut up' following claims of having evidence in Budna case". BBN. 20 January 2026.
203. "Police Commissioner named in Budna abduction lawsuit". News 5. 23 January 2026.
204. "Budna's attorney explains why constitutional case had to be brought". 7News. 23 January 2026.
205. Silva O (24 January 2026). "Budna, the state, and the slow unraveling of accountability". National Perspective Belize.
206. "Is this the licence plate of the vehicle that abducted Budna?". 7News. 28 January 2026.
207. "Kareem concedes a crime was committed on August 22nd". 7News. 28 January 2026.
208. "Musa seeks dismissal of Budna constitutional case". News 5. 28 January 2026.
209. "Budna's bro detained for alleged cybercrimes". 7News. 6 February 2026.
210. "Budna's brother detained for cyberbullying, says police still have all his devices". 7News. 10 February 2026.
211. "UDP says Yellowman detention pattern of weaponizing police to suppress speech". 7News. 10 February 2026.
212. "UDP presses government on unresolved cross-border abduction of Joseph Budna". Love News. 10 February 2026.
