= Ralph Fonseca =

Belizean politician (1949–2025)

Member of the Belize House of Representatives for Belize Rural Central
- In office 30 June 1993 – 7 February 2008
- Preceded by: (constituency created)
- Succeeded by: Michael Hutchinson

Minister of Home Affairs
- In office 2006–2008
- Prime Minister: Said Musa

Minister of Finance
- In office 2003–2004
- Prime Minister: Said Musa
- Preceded by: Said Musa
- Succeeded by: Said Musa

Personal details
- Born: 9 August 1949 British Honduras
- Died: 6 June 2025 (aged 75) Belize
- Party: People's United Party
- Education: St. John's College, Belize
- Occupation: Politician, civil servant

Ralph Henry Fonseca (9 August 1949 – 6 June 2025) was a Belizean politician and a member of the People's United Party.

== Background ==
Fonseca was born on 9 August 1949. He attended St. John's College High School and Sixth Form in British Honduras before going to university in Canada to major in information technology, specialising in systems analysis and control data. He was married with three children. Fonseca reportedly loved diving and fishing. Fonseca was a cousin of former PUP leader and Leader of the Opposition Francis Fonseca. Fonseca's younger brother, David, served as Mayor of Belize City from 1999 until 2006.

Fonseca's only son, Ralph Fonseca Jr. was killed in a motor accident on 11 September 2007. Ralph Fonseca died on 6 June 2025, at the age of 75.

== Political history ==
In 1984, he became a candidate for the House of Representatives in Queen's Square, running against attorney and city councillor Dean Barrow. He lost and returned to private life until 1989, when he was appointed a Senator and Minister of State in Finance and Leader of Government Business in the Senate of Belize until 1993.

In the 1993 elections he won in the newly created Belize Rural Central constituency despite the PUP's close overall loss. He repeated this victory in 1998 and 2003. He served in Cabinet as Minister of Budget Management, Investment and Home Affairs until 2003, when he was moved to Finance again while keeping Home Affairs. Beginning in 2006, he was in charge only of Home Affairs. He became the PUP's national campaign manager in 1985.

Fonseca was undecided as to whether he would seek a fourth term in the February 2008 election, but he subsequently decided to contest his constituency. He was defeated, in what was considered an upset, by the UDP's Michael Hutchinson, a relatively unknown candidate. On 14 February, the PUP announced that Fonesca had resigned as PUP campaign manager.

== Non-political work ==
Before going to Canada, Fonseca acted as an assistant general manager at the Texaco oil company in Belize. In Canada, he was employed in various capacities of information technology. After returning to Belize, he worked as managing director for Belize Brewing Ltd., Hilllbank Agroindustries and Consolidated Electricity Services. Sandwiched between these jobs were posts as Chairman of the former Belize Electricity Board, now Belize Electricity Limited, and the Telecommunications Authority, now BTL. He served as a consultant in the petroleum, mining, airline, and shrimping industries.

== Criticism ==
As Minister of Finance, Fonseca popularised the policy of growth economics, which proposes to develop Belize's economy through privatisation of assets and encouraging foreign investments, which in turn is supposed to create jobs for Belizeans. Supporters argue that Growth Economics is behind Belize's consecutive gains in total growth; detractors say any benefits from growth economics only accrue to PUP interests and in reality Fonseca damaged Belize's international reputation due to high debt and poor economic indicators. He was further accused of practising official corruption, granting favours to party supporters in return for shares in the profits. However, claims either way cannot be measured.

Fonseca had a notably tense relationship with certain media houses antagonistic to his policies. The Amandala and KREM Radio, who under chairman Evan X Hyde had been in partnership with the PUP since 1994, claimed to have ended that relationship under pressure from Fonseca. Tropical Vision Limited Channel 7, managed by Jules Vasquez, also came under fire by Fonseca for a perceived bias against him.
