= David Fonseca (politician) =

Belizean politician (1954–2015)

Mayor of Belize City
- In office 1 March 1999 – 1 March 2006
- Preceded by: Marshall Nuñez
- Succeeded by: Zenaida Moya

Personal details
- Born: 1 May 1954
- Died: 30 April 2015 (aged 60) Belize City, Belize
- Party: People's United Party

William Henry "David" Fonseca (1 May 1954 – 30 April 2015) was a Belizean politician. A member of the People's United Party, Fonseca served as Mayor of Belize City from 1999 to 2006.

Fonseca was the younger brother of former PUP Area Rep. Ralph Fonseca and a cousin of former PUP leader and Leader of the Opposition Francis Fonseca.

Fonseca was elected to the Belize City Council in 1989 and first served as mayor in 1992 when the position was selected annually among councilors. In March 1999 Fonseca became the city's first directly-elected mayor, defeating United Democratic Party nominee Anthony "Boots" Martinez. Fonseca was re-elected in 2003, but was dogged by scandal during his second term. He was not a candidate for re-election in 2006.

== Death ==
On 30 April 2015, Fonesca was found dead of a gunshot wound to the head at a house owned by his mother in Belize City. His death was ruled a suicide.
