= Anthony Martinez (politician) =

Belizean politician

Anthony "Boots" Martinez
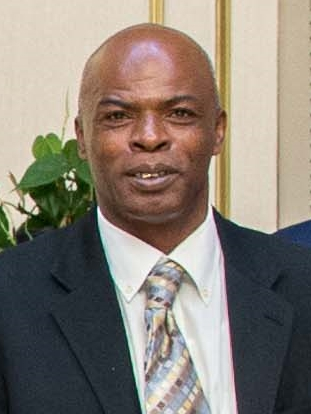
- Belizean politician Anthony "Boots" Martinez

Member of the Belize House of Representatives for Port Loyola
- In office 5 March 2003 – 11 November 2020
- Preceded by: Dolores Balderamos-García
- Succeeded by: Gilroy Usher

Personal details
- Born: 15 July 1963 (age 62)
- Party: United Democratic Party

Anthony "Boots" Martinez (born 15 July 1963) is a Belizean politician. A member of the United Democratic Party, Martinez was first elected to the Belize House of Representatives from the Southside Belize City-based Port Loyola constituency in 2003 after an unsuccessful 1998 campaign. He served as Minister of Public Works from 2008 to 2012 under Prime Minister Dean Barrow. After the UDP government was re-elected in 2012 Martinez became Minister of Human Development, Social Transformation and Poverty Alleviation.

In the 2020 Belizean general election, Martinez was the UDP candidate for the Pickstock constituency, but was defeated by Anthony Mahler of the People's United Party. Martinez stood for Port Loyola again in the 2025 Belizean general election, despite lacking the support of both Shyne Barrow (who nominated Nelma Jones) and Tracy Panton (who nominated Phillip Willoughby). All three were defeated by PUP incumbent Gilroy Usher.

Martinez was the 1999 UDP nominee for Mayor of Belize City, but was defeated by David Fonseca of the People's United Party. Martinez is also known to have several houses and estate in Belize.
