= Dolores Balderamos-García =

Belizean politician

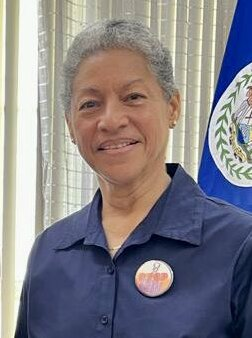

Sr. Minister of State in the Office of the Prime Minister
- Incumbent
- Assumed office March 12, 2025
- Monarch: Charles III
- Governor-General: Froyla Tzalam
- Prime Minister: Johnny Briceño
- Preceded by: Froyla Tzalam

Member of the Belize House of Representatives for Belize Rural Central
- In office 7 March 2012 – 4 November 2015
- Preceded by: Michael Hutchinson
- Succeeded by: Beverly Williams

Member of the Belize House of Representatives for Port Loyola
- In office 27 August 1998 – 5 March 2003
- Preceded by: Henry Young
- Succeeded by: Anthony Martinez

Personal details
- Born: 1957 (age 68–69)
- Party: People's United Party

Dolores Balderamos-García (born 1957) is a Belizean lawyer, politician, activist, broadcaster and author.

As a member of the People's United Party, she served as Belize's Minister of Human Development, Women and Civil Society, where her emphasis was on improving the condition of women and children and bringing about gender equality. From 2003 to 2008 she also worked for the Government of Belize as Ambassador/Special Envoy for Children, Gender and HIV/AIDS.

== Education and early career ==
She received primary and secondary education in Belize, followed by a partial scholarship to Viterbo University in Wisconsin, where she graduated cum laude in 1979. This was followed by a Master's degree in English, from Marquette University. In 1982 Balderamos-Garcia decided to attend the University of the West Indies to study law. She received her Bachelor of Laws degree from the Norman Manley Law School in 1985 and was admitted to practice law in Belize in 1987.

She was a Member of the Board of Directors of the Belize Sugar Board between 1989 and 1991, of the Broadcasting Corporation of Belize from 1990 to 1992 and of the Belize Zoo and Tropical Educational Center (1995–1996).

== Political career ==
Balderamos-García has held several positions in the People's United Party, including National Women's Organizer and member of Central Executive (1990–1994), and President of United Women's Group, the women's arm of the party (1994–1997). In 1993 she was named a senator on the advice of Leader of the Opposition George Cadle Price.

In 1998 Balderamos-García was elected to the House of Representatives of Belize for the Port Loyola Constituency, and named Minister of Human Development, Women and Civil Society by then-Prime Minister Said Musa. In March 2005 Musa appointed her to a second Senate term. At the same time, Balderamos-García was also a member of the Commonwealth of Nations Observer Group for National Elections in Zanzibar, Tanzania (2005) and served as chair of the Commonwealth Expert Team of Observers for Local Government Elections in Sierra Leone (2008).

In 2011, Balderamos-García was voted PUP standard bearer for the Belize Rural Central division, and in 2012 she won the election. She served as the representative for the constituency until the 2015 general elections, when she was defeated.

== Activism ==
In 2000 she was appointed as the first Chairperson of the National AIDS Commission, a position she held until 2008. Through her leadership, the PUP Government passed the human rights based National Policy on HIV/AIDS, and began to provide free life saving anti-retroviral medication.

She is chairperson of the steering committee of Living With Hope, a charity organization which provides help to persons living with HIV and AIDS. She also serves on the Board of Directors of both the Belize Council for the Visually Impaired and the Alliance Against AIDS. She has been a Member of Steering Committee for the Pan Caribbean HIV/AIDS Forum since February 2008.

== Broadcasting ==
Since the late 1980s, Balderamos-García has been the host of the weekly program "Jazz Vibes" on VIBES Radio, and for several years contributed a jazz-centred column to the Belize Times. In 2009, she compiled these columns into the book "Jazz Sketches; Profiles of Thirty Greats".

== Family ==
Balderamos-García is a niece of the late former Prime Minister George Cadle Price.
