= Port Loyola =

- Constituency for the Belize House of Representatives
- District: Belize
- Electorate: 4,698 (2015)
- Major settlements: Belize City (part)

Current constituency
- Created: 1984
- Party: People's United Party
- Area Representative: Gilroy Usher

Port Loyola is an electoral constituency in the Belize District represented in the House of Representatives of the National Assembly of Belize since 2020 by Gilroy Usher of the People's United Party (PUP).

Port Loyola is a great constituency in Belize created in 1984

== History ==
Port Loyola, extending from the North Creek to the Port Authority and eastward to the Yarborough Bridge, was created in 1984 on the eve of that year's legislative elections. Its first representative was businessman Henry Young, who was reelected in 1989 and 1993 before stepping aside in 1998.

In 1998, the UDP selected Anthony "Boots" Martinez to contest the division against lawyer Dolores Balderamos-García. Balderamos-García defeated Martinez badly and served until 2003, when Martinez won election.

== Area representatives ==
Election	Area representative	Party
1984	Henry Young	UDP
1989	Henry Young	UDP
1993	Henry Young	UDP
1998	Dolores Balderamos-García	PUP
2003	Anthony Martinez	UDP
2008	Anthony Martinez	UDP
2012	Anthony Martinez	UDP
2015	Anthony Martinez	UDP
2020	Gilroy Usher	PUP
2025	Gilroy Usher	PUP

== Elections ==
Election	Political result	Candidate	Party	Votes	%	±%
2025 general election Electorate: 4,804; Turnout: 2,547 (53.02%) −24.34	PUP hold Majority: 1,225 (48.10%) +25.89	Gilroy Usher	PUP	1,577	61.92	+2.94
2025 general election Electorate: 4,804; Turnout: 2,547 (53.02%) −24.34	PUP hold Majority: 1,225 (48.10%) +25.89	Anthony Martinez	UDP	352	36.77 13.82	-22.95
2025 general election Electorate: 4,804; Turnout: 2,547 (53.02%) −24.34	PUP hold Majority: 1,225 (48.10%) +25.89	Philip Wiloughby	UDP	261	10.25	-26.52
2025 general election Electorate: 4,804; Turnout: 2,547 (53.02%) −24.34	PUP hold Majority: 1,225 (48.10%) +25.89	Nelma Jones	UDP	151	5.93	-30.84
2025 general election Electorate: 4,804; Turnout: 2,547 (53.02%) −24.34	PUP hold Majority: 1,225 (48.10%) +25.89	Wilmore Tablada	People's Democratic Movement (Belize)	54	2.12	-
2020 general election Electorate: 4,717; Turnout: 3,649 (77.36%) +15.31	PUP gain from UDP; Majority: 793 (22.21%) +19.61	Gilroy Usher	PUP	2,106	58.98	+12.94
2020 general election Electorate: 4,717; Turnout: 3,649 (77.36%) +15.31	PUP gain from UDP; Majority: 793 (22.21%) +19.61	Philip Willougby	UDP	1,313	36.77	-11.87
2020 general election Electorate: 4,717; Turnout: 3,649 (77.36%) +15.31	PUP gain from UDP; Majority: 793 (22.21%) +19.61	Evan Thompson	BPP	152	4.25	+1.09
2015 general election Electorate: 4,698; Turnout: 2,915 (62.05%) −1.28	UDP hold Majority: 76 (2.60%) −25.62	Anthony Martinez	UDP	1,418	48.64	−14.58
2015 general election Electorate: 4,698; Turnout: 2,915 (62.05%) −1.28	UDP hold Majority: 76 (2.60%) −25.62	Gilroy Usher Sr.	PUP	1,342	46.04	+11.06
2015 general election Electorate: 4,698; Turnout: 2,915 (62.05%) −1.28	UDP hold Majority: 76 (2.60%) −25.62	Nedal Murphy McLaren	BPP	92	3.16	-
2012 general election Electorate: 4,469; Turnout: 2,830 (63.33%) −0.77	UDP hold Majority: 790 (28.24%) −24.76	Anthony Martinez	UDP	1,789	63.22	−10.83
2012 general election Electorate: 4,469; Turnout: 2,830 (63.33%) −0.77	UDP hold Majority: 790 (28.24%) −24.76	Gilroy Usher Sr.	PUP	990	34.98	+13.93
2008 general election Electorate: 4,106; Turnout: 2,632 (64.1%) −5.11	UDP hold Majority: 1,395 (53.0%) +32.54	Anthony Martinez	UDP	1,949	74.05	+14.61
2008 general election Electorate: 4,106; Turnout: 2,632 (64.1%) −5.11	UDP hold Majority: 1,395 (53.0%) +32.54	Oscar Rosado	PUP	554	21.05	−17.93
2008 general election Electorate: 4,106; Turnout: 2,632 (64.1%) −5.11	UDP hold Majority: 1,395 (53.0%) +32.54	Erwin Muhammed "X" Jones	VIP	122	4.64	-
2003 general election Electorate: 5,800; Turnout: 4,014 (69.21%) −13.84	UDP gain from PUP; Majority: 821 (20.46%) +0.99	Anthony Martinez	UDP	2,386	59.44	+20.13
2003 general election Electorate: 5,800; Turnout: 4,014 (69.21%) −13.84	UDP gain from PUP; Majority: 821 (20.46%) +0.99	Dolores Balderamos-García	PUP	1,565	38.98	−19.8
2003 general election Electorate: 5,800; Turnout: 4,014 (69.21%) −13.84	UDP gain from PUP; Majority: 821 (20.46%) +0.99	Percival Reynolds	Independent	45	1.12	-
1998 general election Electorate: 4,349; Turnout: 3,612 (83.05%) +21.4	PUP gain from UDP; Majority: 703 (19.47%) +6.87	Dolores Balderamos-García	PUP	2,123	58.78	+15.08
1998 general election Electorate: 4,349; Turnout: 3,612 (83.05%) +21.4	PUP gain from UDP; Majority: 703 (19.47%) +6.87	Anthony Martinez	UDP	1,420	39.31	−16.99
1998 general election Electorate: 4,349; Turnout: 3,612 (83.05%) +21.4	PUP gain from UDP; Majority: 703 (19.47%) +6.87	Robert "Corporal" Mariano	PDP	32	0.88	-
1998 general election Electorate: 4,349; Turnout: 3,612 (83.05%) +21.4	PUP gain from UDP; Majority: 703 (19.47%) +6.87	Eigenia Vilkirey Lamb Cayetano	NABR	19	0.53	-
1993 general election Electorate: 4,196; Turnout: 2,587 (61.65%) +3.06	UDP hold Majority: 327 (12.6%) −4.2	Henry Young	UDP	1,457	56.3	0
1993 general election Electorate: 4,196; Turnout: 2,587 (61.65%) +3.06	UDP hold Majority: 327 (12.6%) −4.2	Doria Bowman	PUP	1,130	43.7	+4.2
1989 general election Electorate: 3,002; Turnout: 1,759 (58.59%) −4.22	UDP hold Majority: 296 (16.8%) −8.6	Henry Young	UDP	991	56.3	−5.4
1989 general election Electorate: 3,002; Turnout: 1,759 (58.59%) −4.22	UDP hold Majority: 296 (16.8%) −8.6	Ernest Staine	PUP	695	39.5	+3.2
1984 general election Electorate: 2,452; Turnout: 1,540 (62.81%) n/a	UDP win Majority: 572 (25.4%) n/a	Henry Young	UDP	1,112	61.7	-
1984 general election Electorate: 2,452; Turnout: 1,540 (62.81%) n/a	UDP win Majority: 572 (25.4%) n/a	Ernest Staine	PUP	540	36.3	-
