= Belize Rural Central =

Electoral constituency in Belize

- Constituency for the Belize House of Representatives
- District: Belize
- Electorate: 7,513 (2015)
- Major settlements: Ladyville, Hattieville

Current constituency
- Created: 1993
- Party: People's United Party
- Area Representative: Dolores Balderamos-García

Belize Rural Central is an electoral constituency in the Belize District represented in the House of Representatives of the National Assembly of Belize since 2020 by Dolores Balderamos-García of the People's United Party (PUP).

== Profile ==
The Belize Rural Central constituency was created for the 1993 general election by a split of the existing Belize Rural South constituency. Out of the 13 Belize District constituencies it is one of three located outside the Belize City limits, consisting of the southern half of the Belize District mainland. It includes Ladyville and the Philip S. W. Goldson International Airport.

== Area representatives ==
Election	Area representative	Party
1993	Ralph Fonseca	PUP
1998	Ralph Fonseca	PUP
2003	Ralph Fonseca	PUP
2008	Michael Hutchinson	UDP
2012	Dolores Balderamos-García	PUP
2015	Beverly Castillo	UDP
2020	Dolores Balderamos-García	PUP
2025	Dolores Balderamos-García	PUP

== Elections ==
Election	Political result	Candidate	Party	Votes	%	±%
2025 general election Electorate: 7,832; Turnout: 4,660 (59.50%) −20.50	PUP hold Majority: 1,528 (32.79%) +11.40	Dolores Balderamos-García	PUP	2,895	62.12	+3.45
2025 general election Electorate: 7,832; Turnout: 4,660 (59.50%) −20.50	PUP hold Majority: 1,528 (32.79%) +11.40	Beverly Williams	UDP	1,367	29.33	−7.95
2025 general election Electorate: 7,832; Turnout: 4,660 (59.50%) −20.50	PUP hold Majority: 1,528 (32.79%) +11.40	David Almendarez	UDP	142	3.05	-34.23
2025 general election Electorate: 7,832; Turnout: 4,660 (59.50%) −20.50	PUP hold Majority: 1,528 (32.79%) +11.40	Estevan Alejandro Perera	People's Democratic Movement (Belize)	49	1.05	-
2025 general election Electorate: 7,832; Turnout: 4,660 (59.50%) −20.50	PUP hold Majority: 1,528 (32.79%) +11.40	Aaron Wilson	Belizeans Justice Movement	34	0.73	-
2020 general election Electorate: 7,445; Turnout: 5,956 (80.00%) +9.67	PUP gain from UDP; Majority: 1,243 (21.39%) +20.29	Dolores Balderamos-García	PUP	3,409	58.67	+11.32
2020 general election Electorate: 7,445; Turnout: 5,956 (80.00%) +9.67	PUP gain from UDP; Majority: 1,243 (21.39%) +20.29	Beverly Williams	UDP	2,166	37.28	−11.17
2020 general election Electorate: 7,445; Turnout: 5,956 (80.00%) +9.67	PUP gain from UDP; Majority: 1,243 (21.39%) +20.29	Lion Bennett	BPP	181	3.12	+0.24
2020 general election Electorate: 7,445; Turnout: 5,956 (80.00%) +9.67	PUP gain from UDP; Majority: 1,243 (21.39%) +20.29	Luz Hunter	Belize People's Front	54	0.93	-
2015 general election Electorate: 7,513; Turnout: 5,284 (70.33%) +4.16	UDP gain from PUP; Majority: 58 (1.10%) -4.11	Beverly Castillo	UDP	2,560	48.45	+2.47
2015 general election Electorate: 7,513; Turnout: 5,284 (70.33%) +4.16	UDP gain from PUP; Majority: 58 (1.10%) -4.11	Dolores Balderamos-García	PUP	2,502	47.35	−3.84
2015 general election Electorate: 7,513; Turnout: 5,284 (70.33%) +4.16	UDP gain from PUP; Majority: 58 (1.10%) -4.11	Javier Molina	BPP	152	2.88	-
2012 general election Electorate: 5,920; Turnout: 3,917 (66.17%) −10.04	PUP gain from UDP; Majority: 204 (5.21%) +0.64	Dolores Balderamos-García	PUP	2,005	51.19	+4.57
2012 general election Electorate: 5,920; Turnout: 3,917 (66.17%) −10.04	PUP gain from UDP; Majority: 204 (5.21%) +0.64	Michael Hutchinson	UDP	1,801	45.98	−5.21
2012 general election Electorate: 5,920; Turnout: 3,917 (66.17%) −10.04	PUP gain from UDP; Majority: 204 (5.21%) +0.64	Fred Hunter Sr.	PNP	74	1.89	-
2008 general election Electorate: 5,032; Turnout: 3,835 (76.21%) +5.42	UDP gain from PUP; Majority: 175 (4.57%) −28.43	Michael Hutchinson	UDP	1,963	51.19	+17.69
2008 general election Electorate: 5,032; Turnout: 3,835 (76.21%) +5.42	UDP gain from PUP; Majority: 175 (4.57%) −28.43	Ralph Fonseca	PUP	1,788	46.62	−19.88
2008 general election Electorate: 5,032; Turnout: 3,835 (76.21%) +5.42	UDP gain from PUP; Majority: 175 (4.57%) −28.43	Harrisford B. Myers	VIP	36	0.94	-
2008 general election Electorate: 5,032; Turnout: 3,835 (76.21%) +5.42	UDP gain from PUP; Majority: 175 (4.57%) −28.43	Queen Miller	Independent	16	0.42	-
2003 general election Electorate: 4,482; Turnout: 3,173 (70.79%) −15.22	PUP hold Majority: 1,047 (33.0%) −14.57	Ralph Fonseca	PUP	2,110	66.5	−6.05
2003 general election Electorate: 4,482; Turnout: 3,173 (70.79%) −15.22	PUP hold Majority: 1,047 (33.0%) −14.57	Colin Gillett	UDP	1,063	33.5	+8.52
1998 general election Electorate: 3,524; Turnout: 3,031 (86.01%) +16.03	PUP hold Majority: 1,442 (47.57%) +1.77	Ralph Fonseca	PUP	2,199	72.55	−0.35
1998 general election Electorate: 3,524; Turnout: 3,031 (86.01%) +16.03	PUP hold Majority: 1,442 (47.57%) +1.77	Louis S. Sylvestre	UDP	757	24.98	−2.12
1998 general election Electorate: 3,524; Turnout: 3,031 (86.01%) +16.03	PUP hold Majority: 1,442 (47.57%) +1.77	Gloria Marie Bowen	PDP	48	1.58	-
1993 general election Electorate: 2,805; Turnout: 1,963 (69.98%) n/a	PUP win Majority: 899 (45.8%) n/a	Ralph Fonseca	PUP	1,431	72.9	-
1993 general election Electorate: 2,805; Turnout: 1,963 (69.98%) n/a	PUP win Majority: 899 (45.8%) n/a	Lloyd Gillett	UDP	532	27.1	-
