= Beverly Castillo =

Belizean politician

Beverly Ann Castillo is a politician from Belize. In November 2015, Castillo was appointed by Prime Minister Dean Barrow to be a Belize Minister of State in the Ministry of Immigration. Previously, Castillo was the chief executive officer of the Ministry of Natural Resources. Castillo, a member of the United Democratic Party (UDP) was elected to the House of Representative in the November 2015 General Election for the Belize Rural Central constituency.

== Career ==
Castillo was the chief executive officer of the Ministry of Natural Resources (colloquially known as the Lands Department) for approximately five years. She resigned from the position in November 2013. She was involved in a Supreme Court case when Bernadette Pickwoad, a Belizean-American, claimed Castillo used her influence to incorrectly procure a lease for her son and mother. She was ultimately withdrawn from the injunction and an official statement was sent out from the Lands Department defending Castillo and "her integrity".

In March 2014, Castillo was selected at the United Democratic Party convention to be the standard bearer for the Belize Rural Center Constituency. She received 961 votes, compared to the 502 votes secured by former UDP Minister of State Michael Hutchinson and the 353 votes that went to City Councilor Dean Samuels. Her campaign was noted for its sophisticated approach, including posters, media advertisements, and a t-shirt-clad, worker-centric support base.

In November 2015, Castillo was elected to the Belize House of Representatives as a member of the United Democratic Party (UDP). She received 2,560 votes in the Belize Rural Central region, overtaking her opponent, two-term incumbent and People's United Party member Dolores Balderamos Garcia, by 58 votes. The Reporter noted this election outcome as a "significant upset." Shortly after this victory, Castillo was appointed as Minister of State of the Ministry of Immigration.

In 2016, Castillo sparked controversy for firing Ingrid Hernandez, a UDP stalwart. While there was speculation that Hernandez was fired for supporting Patrick Faber, Castillo claimed that she was fired for leaking information out of the constituency office, something Hernandez had publicly admitted in a Facebook post.

That same year, Castillo sponsored a local football tournament.
