= Michael Hutchinson (politician) =

Belizean politician

Michael "Hutchy" Hutchinson

Member of the Belize House of Representatives for Belize Rural Central
- In office 7 February 2008 – 7 March 2012
- Preceded by: Ralph Fonseca
- Succeeded by: Dolores Balderamos-García

Personal details
- Party: United Democratic Party

Michael "Hutchy" Hutchinson is a Belizean politician. He is a former Minister of State for Labour, Local Government and Rural Development.

A member of the United Democratic Party, Hutchinson was elected to the Belize House of Representatives from the Belize Rural Central constituency in 2008, defeating People's United Party Cabinet minister Ralph Fonseca. He was defeated for re-election in 2012 by Dolores Balderamos-García.
