= The National Perspective =

Belizean Weekly Newspaper

- Type: Weekly newspaper
- Format: Tabloid
- Editor: Omar Silva
- Founded: 2008
- Headquarters: Belmopan, Belize, Central America
- Website: National Perspective

The National Perspective is one of Belize's five national newspapers and the only one not to operate from Belize City, with its headquarters in Belmopan.

The Perspective was established in August 2008 and is thought to represent the views of a certain section of the People's United Party (PUP); however, it considers itself independent.

== Rivalry with Amandala ==
The National Perspective has consistently called out the nation's leading newspaper, Amandala, and the Kremandala Ltd. media franchise, specifically Amandala publisher Evan X Hyde, for alleged poor journalism and partisan writing.

Amandala has responded selectively, deflecting the criticism and turning it into a larger discussion about the future of Belizean journalism.
