= Mahogany Heights =

Village in Belize

Coordinates: 17°20′18″N 88°34′01″W

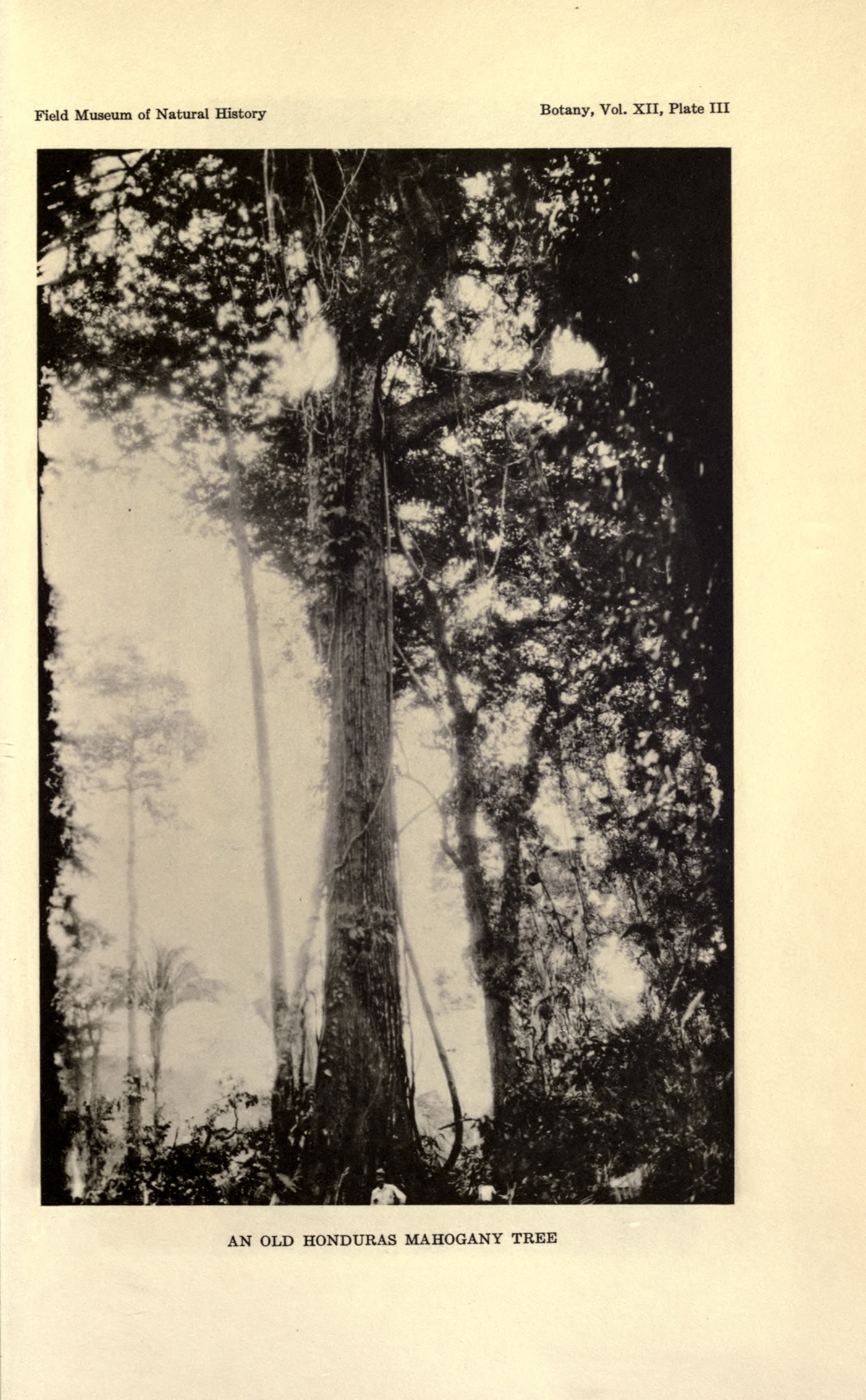
Image of an old Honduran Mahogany tree in Belize, 1936

Mahogany Heights is a village in the Belize District of the central-east coastal region of Belize. Though the area was originally inhabited by Mayans this village was established in the region of Belize that was first settled by Europeans. It is one of 192 municipalities administered at the village level in the country for census taking purposes. The village had several stores and a population of 1,063 in 2010. This represents roughly 1.2 % of the district's total population. No census record was taken for the village in 2000. Mahogany Heights was named for the Honduras Mahogany tree which was cut down as a chief export of Belize during the colonial period.
