= Jules Vasquez =

Belizean journalist

Jules Vasquez (born July 8, 1970) is a Belizean journalist and media executive. He is the News Director and Chief Editor at Tropical Vision Limited, known locally as Channel 7 News, the longest operating broadcaster in Belize. He has developed a reputation in Belize because "his comments strike a chord and his questions leave burning marks when fired."

Jules Vasquez was born in Belize City to parents Nestor and Hazel Vasquez. Nestor Vasquez is a Belizean businessman who is chairman of Belize Telemedia Limited (BTL) and vice chairman of the Central Bank of Belize. Nestor Vasquez founded Tropical Vision Limited in 1981. Jules attended St. John's College in Belize City before enrolling at Florida Atlantic University. After completing one year at Florida Atlantic, Jules decided to forgo a bachelor's degree and returned to Belize. He joined Tropical Vision Limited as Master Control Operator in 1991 and began his own live newscast in 1994. Since 1994 he has been a recognizable news figure in the Belizean media.

Jules was called 2007's "Man of the Year" by The Independent newspaper for "ask[ing] the questions everyone else seems reluctant to ask."
