= Conservation in Belize =

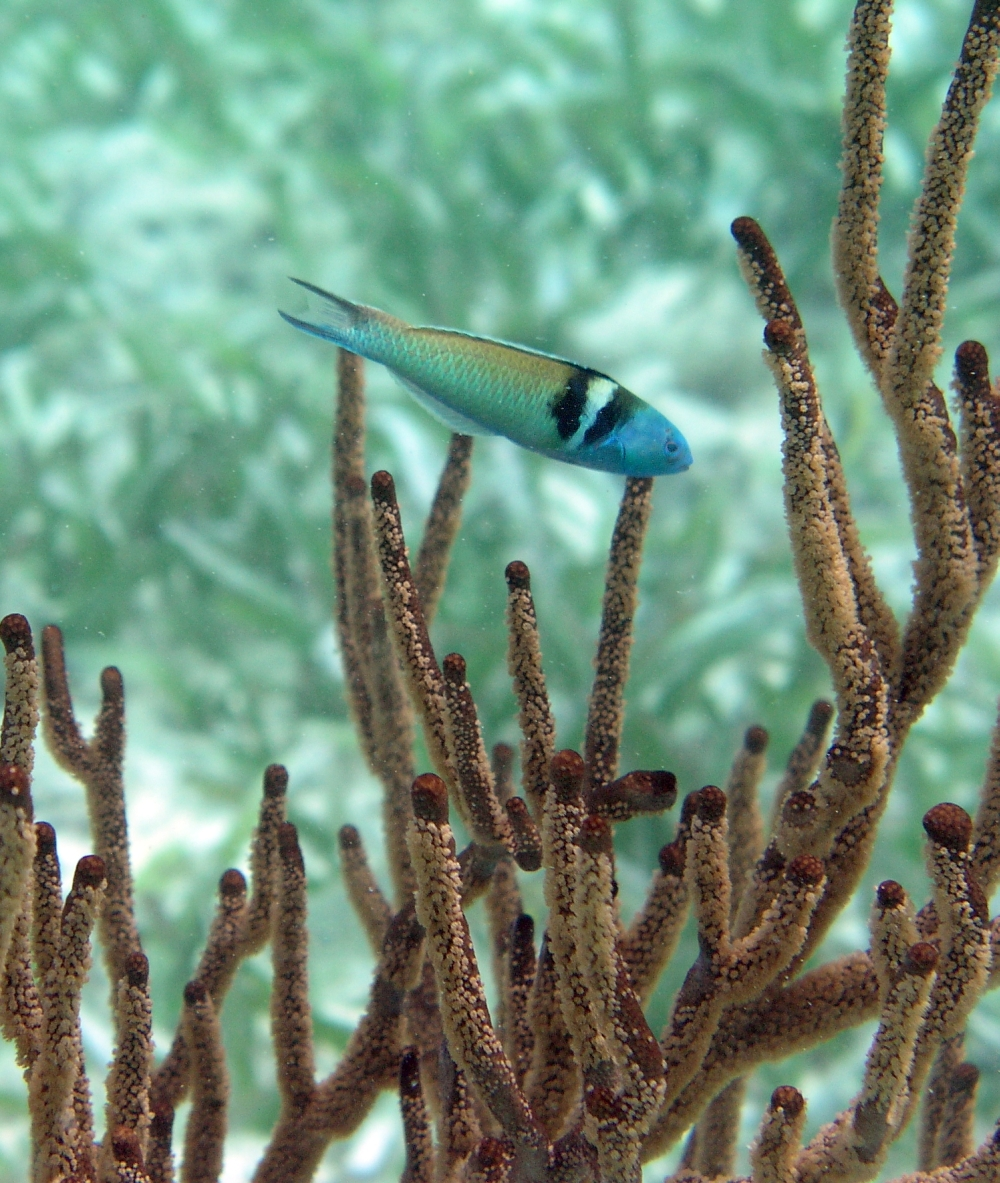
A bluehead wrasse in the Belize Barrier Reef, part of the world's second-largest coral reef system

Since declaring independence in 1981, Belize has enacted many environmental protection laws aimed at the preservation of the country's natural and cultural heritage, as well as its wealth of natural resources. These acts have established a number of different types of protected areas, including wildlife sanctuaries, national parks, and marine reserves, with each category having its own set of regulations dictating public access, resource extraction, land use and ownership.

Roughly 37.32% of Belizean land and 20.38% of marine areas are preserved within a total of 119 reserves, which vary in their purpose and level of protection. This network of protected areas exists under a variety of management structures:

- 1,900,469 acres (769,093 ha) of terrestrial reserves;
- 392,970 acres (159,030 ha) of marine reserves;
- 317,615 acres (128,534 ha) protected through officially recognised private conservation initiatives.

However, most of these protected areas are actually for the management of resource use and extraction, rather than for the preservation of the environment. Early colonial history established foundations for conservation systems like land ordinances and forest regulations, which prioritized economic sustainability and resource control over environmental preservation.

== Background ==
=== Biodiversity ===
Situated within the Mesoamerican hotspot, Belize has a high level of terrestrial and aquatic biodiversity. It is home to more than 150 species of mammals, 540 of birds, 150 of amphibians and reptiles, nearly 600 species of freshwater and marine fish and 3,408 species of vascular plants. The country contains a vast array of ecosystems, many of which are critical habitats for threatened and endangered species.

The Mesoamerican Barrier Reef System, stretching the full length of the country's coastline, is the largest unbroken coral reef complex in the Western Hemisphere. In Belize, the reef's rich diversity of corals and other marine life has qualified it to be designated a World Heritage Site, in recognition of its consequent global importance.

Much of the mainland of Belize forms part of the Mesoamerican Biological Corridor, which comprises a network of protected areas linked by biological corridors, stretching from Mexico to Panamá. Belize has two large, unified, blocks of intact virgin rainforest that are likely to be the last strongholds for species that require large, undisturbed areas for their long-term survival, such as the jaguar.

The number of species endemic to Belize is low, since Belize is a small country and does not have many habitats that are unique. Most of the few endemics are found in the Maya Mountains and in the lowland savannas of Belize.

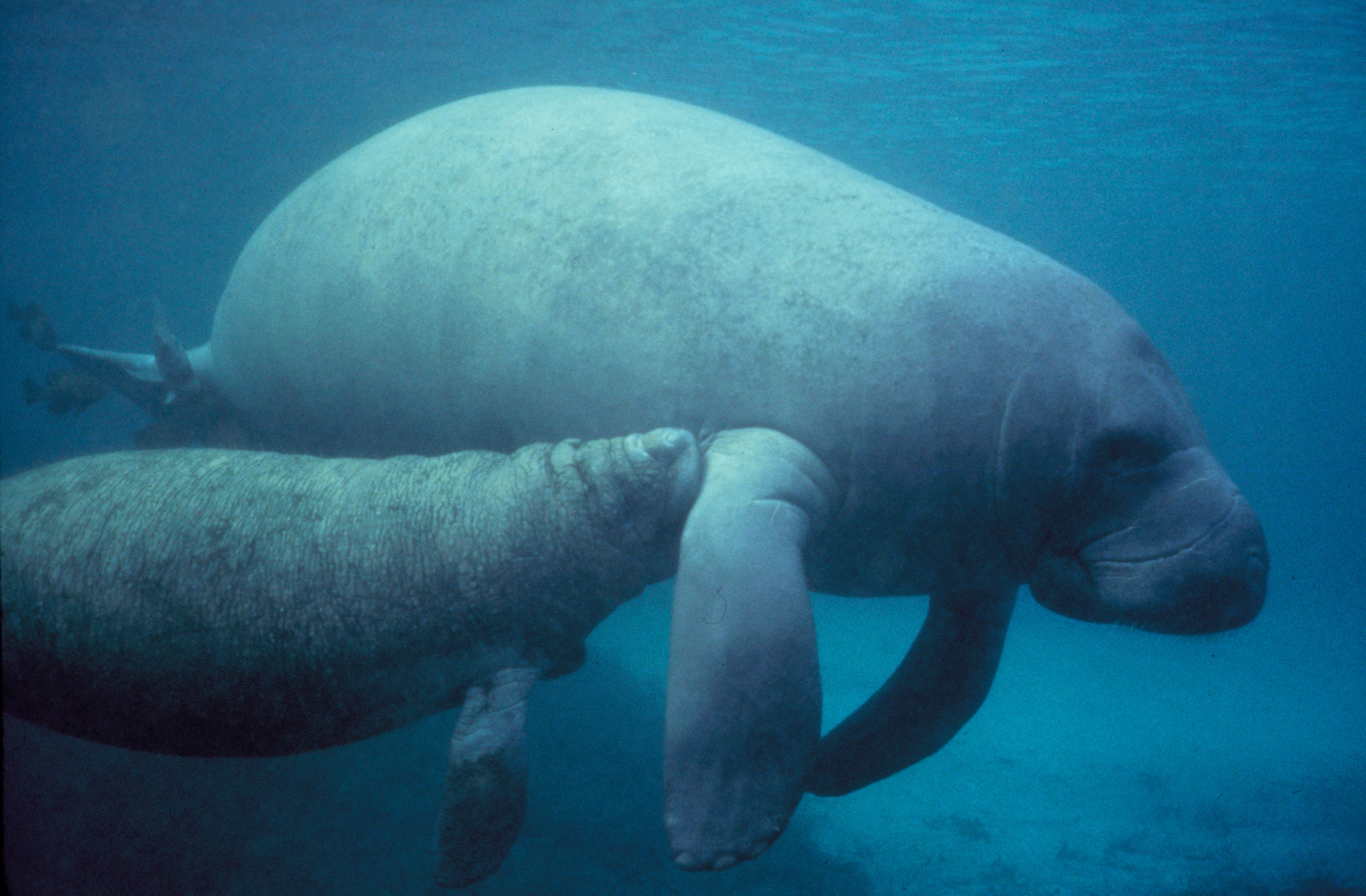
The endangered West Indian manatee (Trichechus manatus)

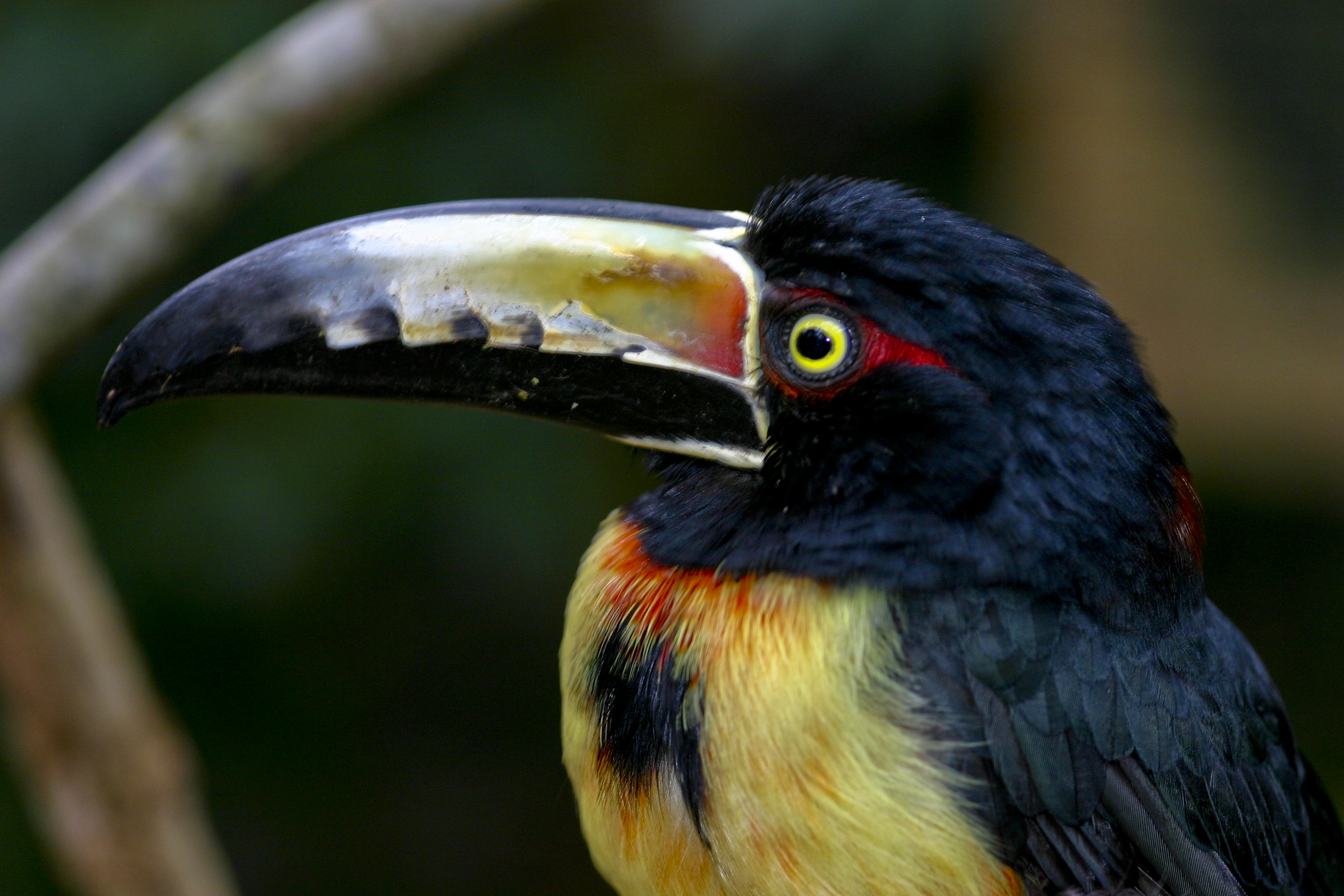
A colourful collared aracari (Pteroglossus torquatus)

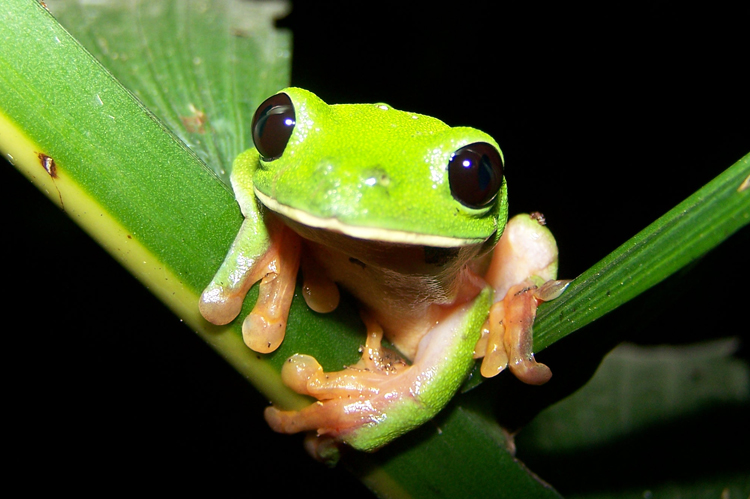
Morelet's treefrog (Agalychnis moreletii), a critically endangered species

=== History ===
Timeline
- 1924: Forests Act.
- 1927: Forests Department is created.
- 1948: Fisheries Act.
- 1972: Ancient Monuments and Antiquities Act.
- 1981: National Park System Act, Wildlife Protection Act.
- 1989: Department of the Environment is created.
- 1992: Environmental Protection Act.
- 1996: Protected Areas Conservation Trust (PACT) is created.

Under British colonization, Belize, formerly British Honduras, faced exploitation and degradation on resources, such as hardwood. Early conservation initiatives began in the late 1800s, creating land policies focused on limiting overexploitation. Such initiatives included the Crown Land Ordinance of 1817, which declared land for the British Crown to regulate extraction. However, these efforts were established for economic sustainability rather than conservation purposes. By restricting hunting practices and establishing forest reserves, cultural hunting practices and sustainable ecological knowledge from Indigenous communities were often excluded.

In 1927, the Forest Ordinance was created. The Forest Ordinance established the legal foundation to designate a protected area. By the time Belize gained independence in 1981, fifteen forest reserves had been designated as protected areas, with harvesting of timber still permitted. The 1948 Fisheries Ordinance was established to regulate fishing of specific species and provided the legal foundation for establishing marine reserves. Scholars have argued that these efforts prioritized privatizing resources while framing these efforts as sustainable development.

Up until the 1970s, British Honduras had relatively relaxed environmental laws that went largely unenforced. However, with the formation of the Belize Audubon Society in 1969, public awareness of the value of conservation grew rapidly. After gaining independence in 1981, the government passed both the National Park System Act and the Wildlife Protection Act, designating an array of protected areas of different status, and providing a codification for the protection of the immense biodiversity of life contained in the parks.

Since then, governmental departments such as the Department of the Environment and the Forests Department, both under the Ministry of Natural Resources and the Environment, were established to research and regulate the issues and laws concerning the country's protected areas. Soon following was the Environmental Protection Act of 1992, which outlined the statutory powers of the Department of the Environment.

To ensure proper financial backing, the Protected Areas Conservation Trust (PACT) was created in 1996. This trust is responsible for all funds raising, and the allocation of funds to protected areas.

Belize is party to a number of legally binding multilateral environmental agreements, many of which deal with proper management of the country's natural resources. These include, most notably, the Convention on International Trade in Endangered Species (CITES), Convention Concerning the Protection of the World Cultural and Natural Heritage, Convention on Biological Diversity (CBD), Convention to Combat Desertification (CCD), Framework Convention on Climate Change (FCCC). Since its ratification of the Ramsar Convention in 1998, Belize has had two sites designated as wetlands of international importance: Crooked Tree Wildlife Sanctuary, in 1998, and Sarstoon-Temash National Park, in 2005.

=== Recent analysis ===
In October 2003, the Ministry of Natural Resources and the Environment began developing a comprehensive "National Protected Areas Policy & System Plan", which focuses on establishing a balance between environmental conservation and the need for economic development, as well as on rationalising the allocation of financial funding and human resources across the protected areas system.

"Reflecting the current thrust in national development, the Work Plan is founded on the need to ensure that biodiversity conservation becomes an important and integral part of national social and economic development. The adopted guiding principle being that the potential contribution of the Protected Areas System to national development and poverty alleviation is maximised, thereby putting the system on a sound and rational footing."

— Jan Meerman, Protected Area System Assessment & Analysis

An evaluation compiled in 2005 identified a number of flaws in the system. These included a lack of government co-ordination with private landowners, and an overall insufficiency of data for reference, planning and management. It criticized the unnecessarily large number of management units, many of which overlap considerably and incongruously, and suggested that it would be more efficient to create a single agency responsible for all areas of natural resource management.

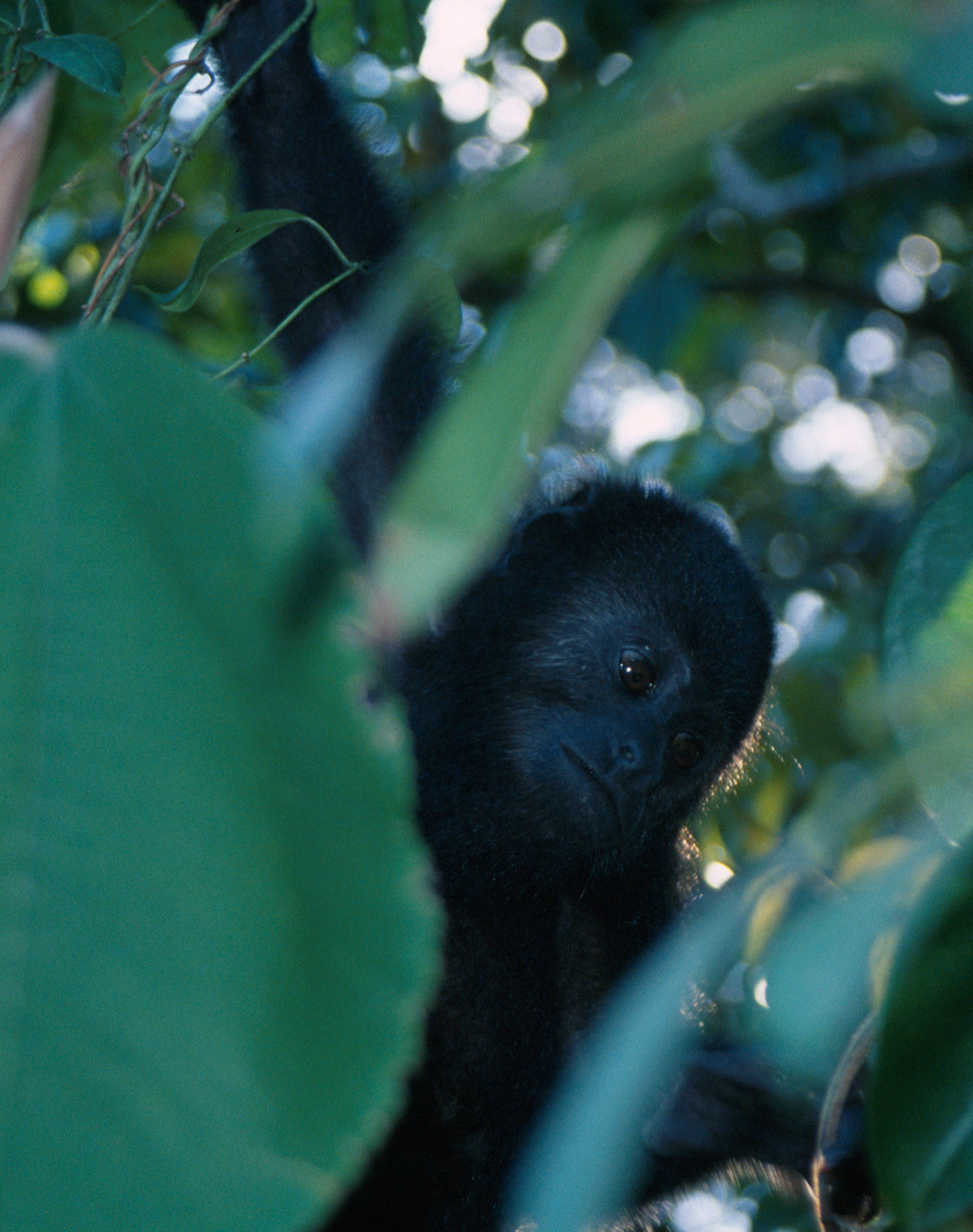
The Community Baboon Sanctuary was established to protect the endangered black howler (Alouatta pigra).

The analysis also noted the need for stricter conservation methods in forest reserves, and to encourage sustainable methods of resource extraction. It stressed the need to further protect and maintain biological corridors in their entirety, which would require the co-operation and participation of private landowners. Another ecotype identified as lacking proper attention was the country's deep water ecosystems, which had received neither formal protection nor any research into whether they should be.

As part of an attempt to priorities resource allocation (both human and financial) across the system, the protected areas were ranked on their ecological, socio-cultural and economic value. The following areas were ranked as the most ecologically important in the country:

1. Río Bravo Conservation and Management Area
2. Aguacaliente Wildlife Sanctuary
3. Bacalar Chico Marine Reserve
4. Glover's Reef Marine Reserve
5. Crooked Tree Wildlife Sanctuary
6. Shipstern Conservation & Management Area
7. Community Baboon Sanctuary

Many of the top-scoring reserves, including Río Bravo, are privately owned. It was recommended that this scoring system be used to monitor the performance of protected areas in the future. The full analysis of the system was published in November 2005.

More recent analysis from 2025 continue to critique the environmental governance systems with how they balance economic growth with long-term environmental preservation. The concept of Blue Economies heavily shapes economic and environmental policies in Belize today. The Ministry of Blue Economy and Civil Aviation integrates blue economy concepts into national policy, including the Integrated Coastal Zone Plan, the Belize Sustainable Ocean Plan, and the Marine Spatial Plan. A department under the Ministry of Blue Economy and Civil Aviation includes the Coastal Zone Management Authority and Institute which executes the Blue Bond Program. This program is an agreement aimed at alleviating Beliz's debt in exchange for increasing the number of marine protected areas and funding marine conservation-related activities. From government and international powers, blue economies are seen as essential for growth of the nation, but critiques argue that local input and concerns often get left out of discussion.

== Protected areas ==
=== Types ===
- Archaeological Reserve: These reserves are designated for the protection of historic archaeological sites, typically ancient Mayan ruins.
- Forest Reserve: These areas are designed for sustainable timber extraction without destroying the biodiversity of the location. Companies are given permits to extract after being reviewed by the Forests Department.
- Marine Reserve: These are designated for the conservation of aquatic ecosystems, including marine animals and their habitats, as well as for the sustainable extraction of marine resources. These reserves are managed by the Department of Fisheries.
- National Park: These parks are areas of recreation and tourism, as well as environmental protection. Visitors are welcome to explore the park.
- Natural Monument: This protected area is designated for unique geographic features of the landscape, to preserve them for research projects and future generations.
- Nature Reserve: These parks enjoy the highest level of protection; permits are required to enter the area and are restricted to researchers only. Nature reserves are typically pristine, wilderness ecosystems.
- Private Reserve: Either official or unofficial, these reserves are owned and operated by private conservation initiatives, and enjoy various levels of protection.
- Wildlife Sanctuary: These areas are created for the preservation of an important keystone species in the ecosystem. By preserving enough area for them to live in, many other species receive the protection they need as well.

=== Management ===
Overall oversight of conservation and management of protected areas in Belize is the responsibility of the Ministry of Natural Resources and the Environment. The country's system of private reserves are co-ordinated under the Belize Association of Private Protected Areas.

The Belize Audubon Society (BAS) was founded in 1969, and oversees a total of nine protected areas, including 4 natural monuments, 2 national parks, 2 wildlife sanctuaries and 1 nature reserve. The BAS also delegated a co-management strategy, which is thought to provide local non-governmental influences on environmental decision-making power.

The Protected Areas Conservation Trust (PACT), founded in 1995, provides funds for the development of conservation and the promotion of environmentally sound management of Belize's natural and cultural resources, in order to foster sustainable development. It is primarily financed by the collection of a conservation levy included in the country's airport departure tax.

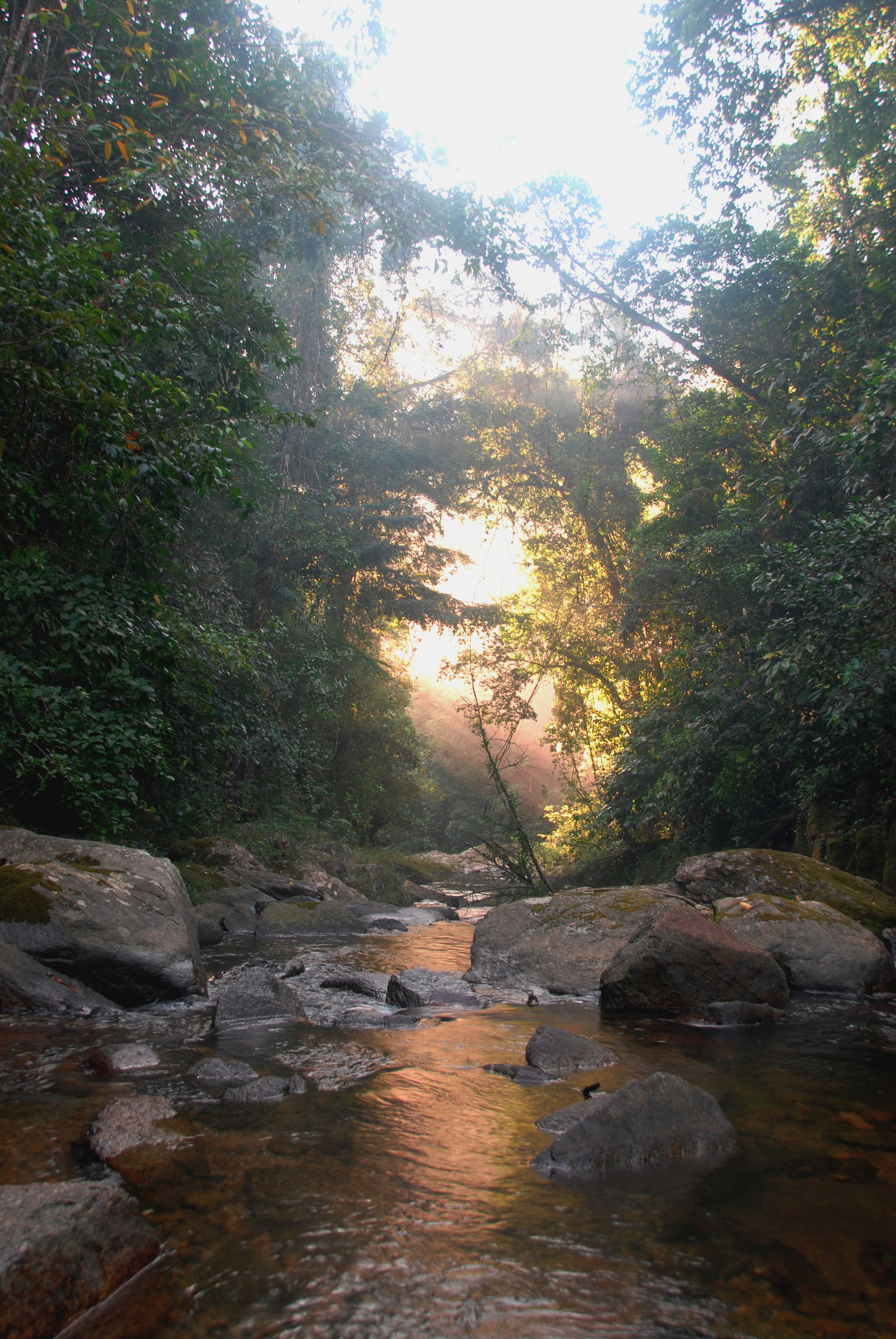
Bladen Nature Reserve is the country's largest nature reserve, preserving a valley of undisturbed old growth rainforest. It is surrounded on all sides by other conservation areas.

=== Design ===
To protect as many different species and ecosystems as possible, methods of conservation biology are used to maximise the biodiversity of each park or reserve. There are design methods to these parks on both the micro and macro scale.

When designing a particular park, care is taken to ensure that the area contains as many different ecosystems as possible, and allows enough space for populations of species to thrive. An edge effect, or the negative impacts of having developed or destroyed land all the way up to the edge of protected area, can be very detrimental to the organisms living in the preserve. To compensate for this, parks are planned to have as much of a buffer zone as possible to prevent destructive practices all the way to a parks perimeter. Well planned protected areas also prevent phenomenon such as habitat fragmentation. For instance, the Bladen Nature Reserve, an area of pristine primary rainforest, is surrounded on all sides by other less regulated protected areas, ensuring that no negative edge effects will ever reach the borders of the reserve.

On the larger scale, parks are designed together to create corridors, or areas of passage for migratory or wide-ranging species. A great example of this is the planned Mesoamerican Biological Corridor, which, when completed, will allow for the migration of animals from Mexico through Central America and down into South America.

== Critical species ==
As part of the process to assess the conservation status and the risk of local extinction of native species, the Ministry of Natural Resources and the Environment maintains a "National List of Critical Species", including both terrestrial and marine species, prepared under the IUCN guidelines for regional red lists. While the list uses IUCN terminology, it does not claim to have followed the IUCN Red List methodology to the full extent.

Under the system applied in the IUCN Red List database, species are classified in nine categories, set through criteria such as rate of decline, population size, area of geographic distribution, and degree of population and distribution fragmentation.

IUCN Red List categories

The categories used in the National List of Critical Species follow the framework of the International Union for Conservation of Nature. By assigning Belizean species to these global categories, government agencies and conservation organisations can compare local trends with regional and worldwide assessments and prioritise limited funding and enforcement effort on those taxa facing the highest risk.

- Critically Endangered (CR) — extremely high risk of extinction in the wild.
- Endangered (EN) — High risk of extinction in the wild.
- Vulnerable (VU) — High risk of endangerment in the wild.
- Near Threatened (NT) — Likely to become endangered in the near future.
- Least Concern (LC) — Lowest risk; does not qualify for a more at-risk category. Widespread and abundant taxa are included in this category.
- Data Deficient (DD) — Not enough data to make an assessment of its risk of extinction.
- Not Evaluated (NE) — Has not yet been evaluated against the criteria.

Order	Species	English name	IUCN class	Status in Belize	Justification
Amphibians	Agalychnis moreletii	Morelet's treefrog	CR	DD	3
Amphibians	Bolitoglossa dofleini	Doflein's salamander	NT	DD	3
Amphibians	Bufo campbelli	Campbell's rainforest toad	NT	LC	3
Amphibians	Smilisca cyanosticta	Blue-spotted Mexican treefrog	NT	DD	3
Amphibians	Eleutherodactylus chac	Chac's rainfrog	NT	DD	3
Amphibians	Eleutherodactylus laticeps	Broad-headed rainfrog	NT	DD	3
Amphibians	Eleutherodactylus leprus	Leprus chirping frog	VU	DD	3
Amphibians	Eleutherodactylus psephosypharus	Limestone rainfrog	VU	DD	3
Amphibians	Eleutherodactylus sabrinus	Long-legged streamfrog	EN	DD	3
Amphibians	Eleutherodactylus sandersoni	Sanderson's streamfrog	EN	DD	3
Amphibians	Bromeliohyla bromeliacia	Bromeliad treefrog	EN	DD	3
Amphibians	Rana juliani	Maya Mountains frog	NT	NT	2
Birds	Agamia agami	Agami heron		VU	6,8
Birds	Ajaia ajaja	Roseate spoonbill		VU	6
Birds	Amazona oratrix	Yellow-headed amazon	EN	EN	4,8,9,10
Birds	Amazona xantholora	Yellow-lored amazon		VU	10
Birds	Anous stolidus	Brown noddy		VU	6
Birds	Ara macao cyanoptera	Scarlet macaw		EN	4,8,9,11
Birds	Ardea herodias	Great blue heron		VU	4,10
Birds	Asio stygius	Stygian owl		VU	10
Birds	Bubo virginianus	Great horned owl		VU	10
Birds	Cairina moschata	Muscovy duck		VU	4
Birds	Columba leucocephala	White-crowned pigeon	NT	VU	4,7
Birds	Contopus cooperi	Olive-sided flycatcher	NT	DD	
Birds	Crax rubra	Great curassow	VU	VU	4,9
Birds	Dendrocygna autumnalis	Black-bellied whistling duck		VU	4,10
Birds	Dendrocygna bicolor	Fulvous whistling duck		VU	4,10
Birds	Dendroica cerulea	Cerulean warbler	VU	VU	
Birds	Egretta rufescens	Reddish egret	NT	VU	6,10
Birds	Egretta thula	Snowy egret		VU	6,10
Birds	Egretta tricolor	Tricoloured heron		VU	6,10
Birds	Electron carinatum	Keel-billed motmot	VU	VU	3,8,9
Birds	Eudocimus albus	White ibis		VU	6
Birds	Falco deiroleucus	Orange-breasted falcon		VU	8,9
Birds	Fregata magnificens	Magnificent frigatebird		VU	6
Birds	Harpia harpyja	Harpy eagle	NT	CR	4,7,9,10
Birds	Harpyhaliaetus solitarius	Solitary eagle	NT	CR	4,7,10
Birds	Jabiru mycteria	Jabiru		VU	4,7,9,10, 11
Birds	Laterallus jamaicensis	Black rail	NT	DD	
Birds	Melanoptila glabrirostris	Black catbird	NT	NT	8,9
Birds	Meleagris ocellata	Ocellated turkey	NT	VU	3,4,9
Birds	Morphnus guianensis	Crested eagle	NT	CR	4,7,10
Birds	Mycteria americana	Wood stork		VU	4,6,10
Birds	Nyctanassa violacea	Yellow-crowned night-heron		VU	6
Birds	Nycticorax nycticorax	Black-crowned night-heron		VU	6
Birds	Pelecanus occidentalis	Brown pelican		VU	6,10
Birds	Penelope purpurascens	Crested guan		VU	4
Birds	Nannopterum auritum	Double-crested cormorant		VU	4,6,10
Birds	Nannopterum brasilianum	Neotropic cormorant		VU	4,6,10
Birds	Onychoprion anaethetus	Bridled tern		VU	6
Birds	Onychoprion fuscatus	Sooty tern		VU	6
Birds	Pionopsitta haematotis	Brown-hooded parrot		DD	
Birds	Sarcoramphus papa	King vulture		VU	7,8,9
Birds	Sterna dougallii	Roseate tern		VU	6
Birds	Sternula antillarum	Least tern		VU	6
Birds	Sula leucogaster	Brown booby		VU	6
Birds	Sula sula	Red-footed booby		VU	6
Birds	Thalasseus acuflavidus	Cabot's tern		VU	6
Corals	Anthozoa (all species)	Gorgonians, Telestaceans, Octocorallians, Antipatharians, Scleractinians	VU	VU	9
Corals	Hydrozoa (all species)	Fire corals, lace corals	VU	VU	9
Fishes	Balistes vetula	Queen triggerfish	VU	VU	4,5
Fishes	Dermatolepis inermis	Marbled grouper	VU	CD	1,4,5,6
Fishes	Epinephelus itajara	Goliath grouper	CR	CD	1,4,5,6,9
Fishes	Epinephelus morio	Red grouper	NT	CD	1,4,5,6
Fishes	Epinephelus nigritus	Warsaw grouper	CR	CD	1,4,5,6
Fishes	Epinephelus niveatus	Snowy grouper	VU	CD	1,4,5,6
Fishes	Epinephelus striatus	Nassau grouper	EN	CD	1,4,5,6,9
Fishes	Hippocampus erectus	Lined seahorse	VU	DD	
Fishes	Hippocampus reidi	Longsnout seahorse	DD	DD	
Fishes	Lachnolaimus maximus	Hogfish	VU	VU	4,5
Fishes	Lutjanus analis	Mutton snapper	VU	VU	4,5,6
Fishes	Lutjanus cyanopterus	Cubera snapper	VU	VU	4,5,6
Fishes	Mycteroperca venenosa	Yellowfin grouper	NT	CD	1,4,5,6
Fishes	Pagrus pagrus	Red porgy	EN	DD	4,5
Fishes	Sanopus astrifer	Whitespotted toadfish	VU	DD	
Fishes	Sanopus greenfieldorum	Whitelined toadfish	VU	DD	
Fishes	Sanopus reticulatus	Reticulated toadfish	VU	DD	
Fishes	Sanopus splendidus	Splendid toadfish	VU	DD	
Fishes	Scarus guacamaia	Rainbow parrotfish	VU	VU	4,5
Sharks	Carcharhinus leucas	Bull shark	NT	NT	4,5,9,10
Sharks	Carcharhinus limbatus	Blacktip shark	NT	NT	4,5,9,10
Sharks	Carcharhinus longimanus	Oceanic whitetip shark	VU	NT	4,5,9,10
Sharks	Carcharhinus plumbeus	Sandbar shark	NT	NT	4,5,9,10
Sharks	Galeocerdo cuvier	Tiger shark	NT	NT	4,5,9,10
Sharks	Isurus oxyrinchus	Shortfin mako	VU	NT	4,5,9,10
Sharks	Mustelus canis	Dusky smoothhound	NT	DD	
Sharks	Negaprion brevirostris	Lemon shark	NT	NT	4,5,9,10
Sharks	Prionace glauca	Blue shark	NT	NT	4,5,9,10
Sharks	Pristis pectinata	Smalltooth sawfish	CR	CR	4,5
Sharks	Pristis perotteti	Largetooth sawfish	CR	CR	4,5
Sharks	Rhincodon typus	Whale shark	VU	VU	7,8,9
Sharks	Sphyrna lewini	Scalloped hammerhead	EN	NT	4,5,9,10
Sharks	Sphyrna mokarran	Great hammerhead	EN	DD	4,5,9,10
Sharks	Sphyrna zygaena	Smooth hammerhead	NT	NT	4,5,9,10
Mammals	Alouatta pigra	Guatemalan black howler	EN	VU	3,9
Mammals	Ateles geoffroyi	Central American spider monkey	EN	VU	9
Mammals	Balaenoptera physalus	Fin whale	EN	DD	9
Mammals	Balantiopteryx io	Thomas's sac-winged bat	VU	VU	8
Mammals	Bauerus dubiaquercus	Van Gelder's bat	NT	VU	8
Mammals	Cabassous centralis	Northern naked-tailed armadillo	DD	DD	8
Mammals	Centronycteris centralis	Shaggy bat		VU	8
Mammals	Dicotyles pecari	White-lipped peccary	NT	VU	4,7,10
Mammals	Globicephala macrorhynchus	Short-finned pilot whale	DD	DD	9
Mammals	Herpailurus yaguarondi	Yaguarundi		LC	10
Mammals	Leopardus pardalis	Ocelot		VU	4,9,10
Mammals	Leopardus wiedii	Margay	NT	VU	9,10
Mammals	Lontra longicaudis	Neotropical river otter	DD	VU	10
Mammals	Mazama pandora	Yucatán brown brocket deer	VU	DD	3,4
Mammals	Molossops greenhalli	Greenhall's mastiff bat		VU	8
Mammals	Mormoops megalphylla	Ghost-faced bat		NT	8
Mammals	Myotis elegans	Elegant myotis		VU	8
Mammals	Panthera onca	Jaguar	NT	NT	4,7,9,10
Mammals	Physeter macrocephalus	Sperm whale	VU	DD	9
Mammals	Pteronotus gymnonotus	Greater naked-back bat		NT	8
Mammals	Puma concolor	Puma		NT	4,7,9,10
Mammals	Stenella frontalis	Atlantic spotted dolphin	DD	VU	9
Mammals	Stenella Iongirostris	Spinner dolphin	DD	DD	9
Mammals	Steno bredanensis	Rough-toothed dolphin		DD	9
Mammals	Tapirus bairdii	Central American tapir	EN	VU	4,9,10
Mammals	Thyroptera tricolor	Spix's disk-winged bat		VU	8
Mammals	Trichechus manatus	West Indian manatee	EN	VU	4,9
Mammals	Turiopsis truncatus	Common bottlenose dolphin		VU	9
Plants	Ceratozamia robusta		VU	VU	3
Plants	Pithecellobium johansenii		EN	DD	
Plants	Quiina schippii		EN	DD	
Plants	Schippia concolor	Mountain pimento	VU	LC	2
Plants	Swietenia macrophylla	Large-leaved mahogany	VU	VU	5,9
Plants	Zamia prasina		CR	DD	2,8
Plants	Zamia sp. Nov.	Un-described Zamia		VU	2,8
Plants	Zamia variegata	Variegated zamia	EN	VU	3,9
Reptiles	Caretta caretta	Loggerhead	EN	EN	4,5,6,9
Reptiles	Chelonia mydas	Green turtle	EN	EN	4,5,6,9
Reptiles	Crocodylus acutus	American crocodile	VU	NT	4,9,10
Reptiles	Crocodylus moreletii	Morelet's crocodile	CD	CD	3,4,5,9,10
Reptiles	Dermatemys mawii	Central American river turtle	CR	EN	3,4,5,9
Reptiles	Dermochelys coriacea	Leatherback	CR	CR	4,9
Reptiles	Eretmochelys imbricata	Hawksbill turtle	CR	CR	4,5,6,9
Reptiles	Phyllodactylus insularis	Belize leaf-toed gecko		NT	2
Reptiles	Staurotypus triporcatus	Mexican musk turtle	NT	NT	4
Reptiles	Trachemys scripta	Common slider	NT	LC	4

Justification

The justification codes in the table indicate the main reasons why each taxon appears on the National List of Critical Species. They summarise factors such as endemism, hunting or fishing pressure, economic value and ecological role, and are intended to make the listing process transparent for managers, researchers and the public

1. The present trends in the global populations of all groupers are decreasing. Measures have been taken to protect spawning sites of these fish in Belize, and the government is attempting to introduce measures that will allow it to sustainably manage this resource. For this reason, all grouper species have been placed in the CD (Conservation dependent) category.
2. Endemic species
3. Small range (regionally endemic)
4. Hunted or fished
5. Economic importance
6. Colony breeder (restricted number of breeding colonies/locations)
7. Needs large range
8. Specialised ecological requirements
9. Charismatic species drawing national and international attention
10. Prosecuted as perceived pest
11. Genetically different from South American counterpart

=== Amphibians ===
Because amphibians are especially sensitive to environmental contamination, they are considered excellent indicators of the health of an ecosystem. Neotropic forests host the world's greatest diversity of anuran species. In Belize, amphibian populations remain largely undetermined due to their isolation and probable scarcity, and subsequently only fragmentary information is available on their status and distribution.

From the mid-19th century, various scientific explorers such as Godman, Morelet and Salvin conducted herpetological research from samples collected in Belize and the surrounding Petén Basin. It was not until 1941, however, that herpetologist Karl P. Schmidt made the first attempt to summarise the various species of amphibians in Belize. His studies were summarised in a series of papers by Neill and Allen during the late 1950s and 1960s. Similar reports were later published by R. W. Henderson during the 1970s, C. J. McCoy between 1966 and 1990, and Campbell and Vannini (1989), Meerman (1993), Strafford (1994), and Meyer and Farneti-Foster (1996). These contributed to an increased understanding and an updated checklist of the amphibian species occurring in the country.

=== Birds ===
A total of 550 avian species have been recorded in Belize, including four globally threatened species. Although it has no politically endemic birds, the country is important for the protection of some 36 biome-restricted species. Situated at the northern end of the Mesoamerican mainland, Belize is an important flyway for migratory birds. This route, while still relatively healthy, is under constant threat from anthropogenic activities, including urban and coastal development and increasingly fragmented habitats. Other major concerns surrounding avian conservation in Belize are the effects of hunting and poaching on population trends. Recent marked declines in certain species has spurred a growing interest in engaging locals at all levels to monitor avian populations.

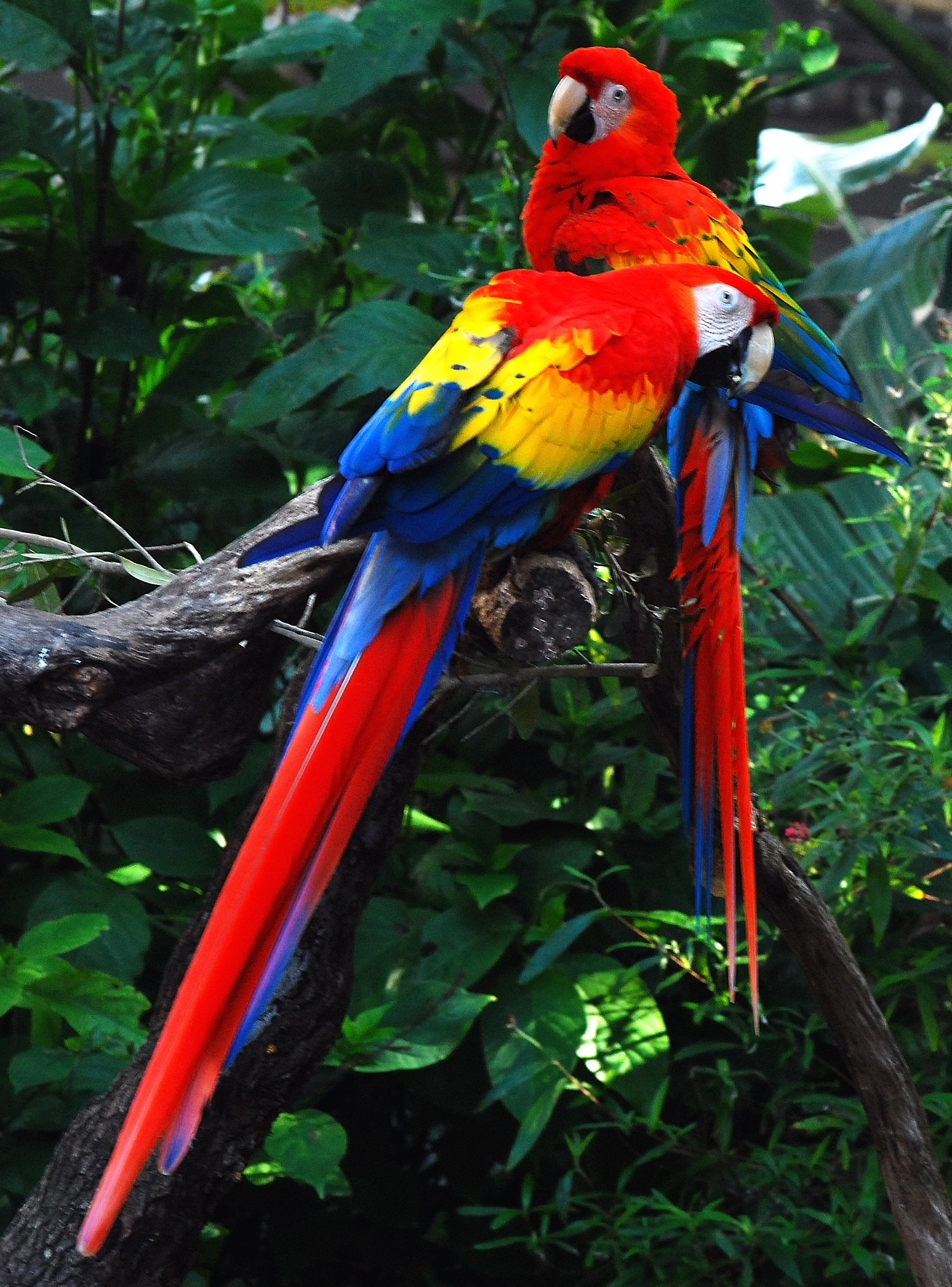
Chiquibul National Park represents one of the last wild havens for scarlet macaws, but it is under threat from poachers.

The early stages of bird conservation in Belize are attributed to the Belize Audubon Society, whose first conservation project was the jabiru, added to Belize's list of protected species in 1973. In 1977, the government established seven bird sanctuaries for the protection of waterfowl nesting and roosting colonies. These currently amount to approximately 13 acres (5.3 ha) of mangrove forests along the leeward shorelines of small cayes. In 1984, however, a field study noted that, due to the absence of wardens, all but one of these cayes had been destroyed by hunters and fishermen.

In 2004, BirdLife International, in partnership with the Belize Audubon Society, delineated six Important Bird Areas in the country, each representing an average of 347 species. While these areas are not formally protected areas, their identification serves to create awareness and guide future conservation initiatives aimed at avian biodiversity. The establishment of monitoring activities has been identified as a key priority in ascertaining the health of these areas.

Poaching is a serious concern for local bird conservationists. Because of the large range of many avian species, surveillance of this activity is almost impossible. The scarlet macaw, threatened with extinction in Belize, has one of its last havens in the Chiquibul forests. Poaching remains almost unchecked in this remote region. Stretching along the border with Guatemala, the birds are smuggled and then sold for high prices on international markets. A macaw chick can be sold for approximately 2,400 quetzales (about BZ$700, or US$310), while adults will fetch up to 4000 quetzales (about BZ$1000, or US$520).

From January to July ever year, the Upper Macal becomes an active breeding ground for macaws. According to the Friends for Conservation and Development, charged with maintaining surveillance in the Chiquibul area, the breeding ground is a prime target for smugglers. In 2009, ten macaws, valued at up to BZ$10,000, were reportedly taken from the Upper Macal by a single poaching party, and then sold in Las Flores, Guatemala. In June 2010, the director of the organisation announced that it had upgraded its monitoring program in this area, but were limited by manpower and resources.

In Guatemala, the macaw population has been diminished primarily due to the robbing of chicks and consequently, we understood that the same fate was prone to occur in Belize. ... We have upgraded our monitoring program, yet Guatemalans are elusive. ... Loss of chicks at the hands of Guatemalan poachers engaged in the pet trade and the removal of the nesting habitat can wipe out the remaining wild populations of macaws in Belize in a few years.

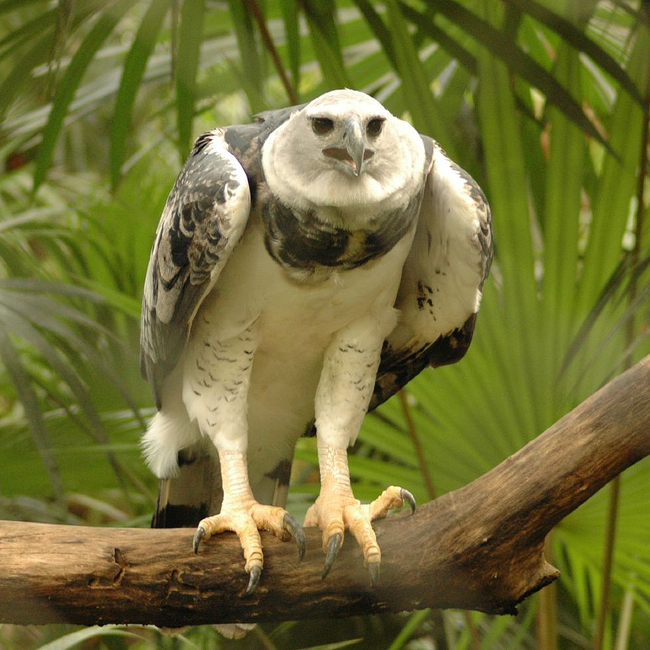
The Belize Zoo has taken a leading role in the reintroduction of the harpy eagle to Belizean forests.

April, May and June are the months when illegal activities spike. Other species, such as the endangered curassow have also been illegally hunted.

The status of eagles in Belize was first summarised in a study by Jack C. Eitniear in 1986. Since then, many of the species recorded by Eitniear have declined as a result of shooting, poaching, and habitat and nest destruction.

A number of initiatives now exist for the conservation of eagle species in Belize. Among them is the Belize Harpy Eagle Restoration Program, started in 2003 by Sharon Matola, the director of the Belize Zoo, for the re-establishment of the harpy eagle within Belize. Captive-bred harpy eagles were released in the Rio Bravo forest, chosen for its ecological quality and preserved connection to similarly protected forests in Guatemala and Mexico. As of November 2009, 14 individuals had been released and were being tracked by The Peregrine Fund. At the beginning of 2011, scientists confirmed the presence of harpy eagle nest in the Bladen Nature Reserve, which represented the first confirmed breeding pair in Belize in over 60 years. It was seen as a major comeback for the species and a success for conservation efforts.

Other avian-based conservation initiatives include Belize Bird Rescue, an organisation founded in April 2004 for the rehabilitation of injured and orphaned birds, with a particular focus on parrots.

=== Jaguar ===
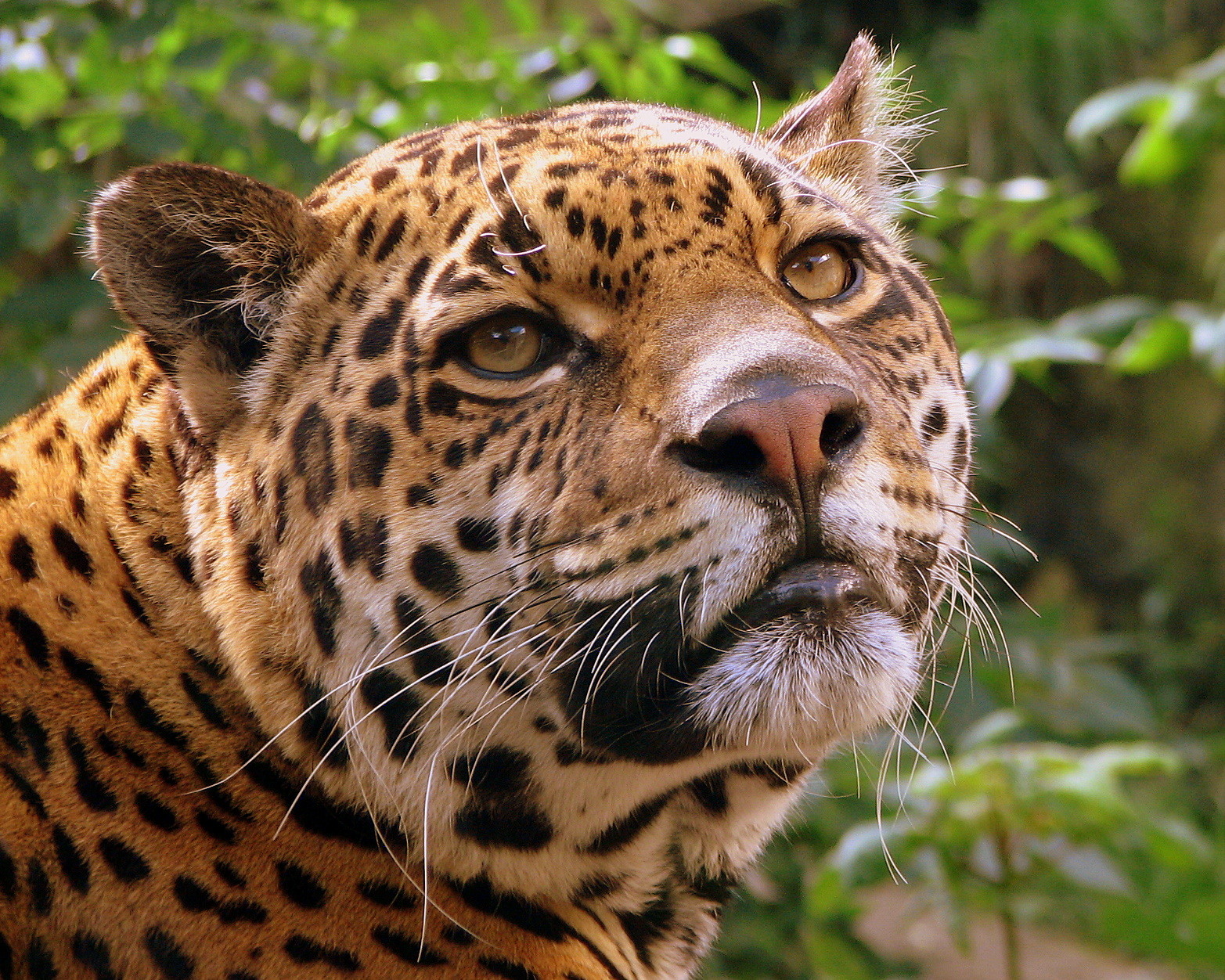
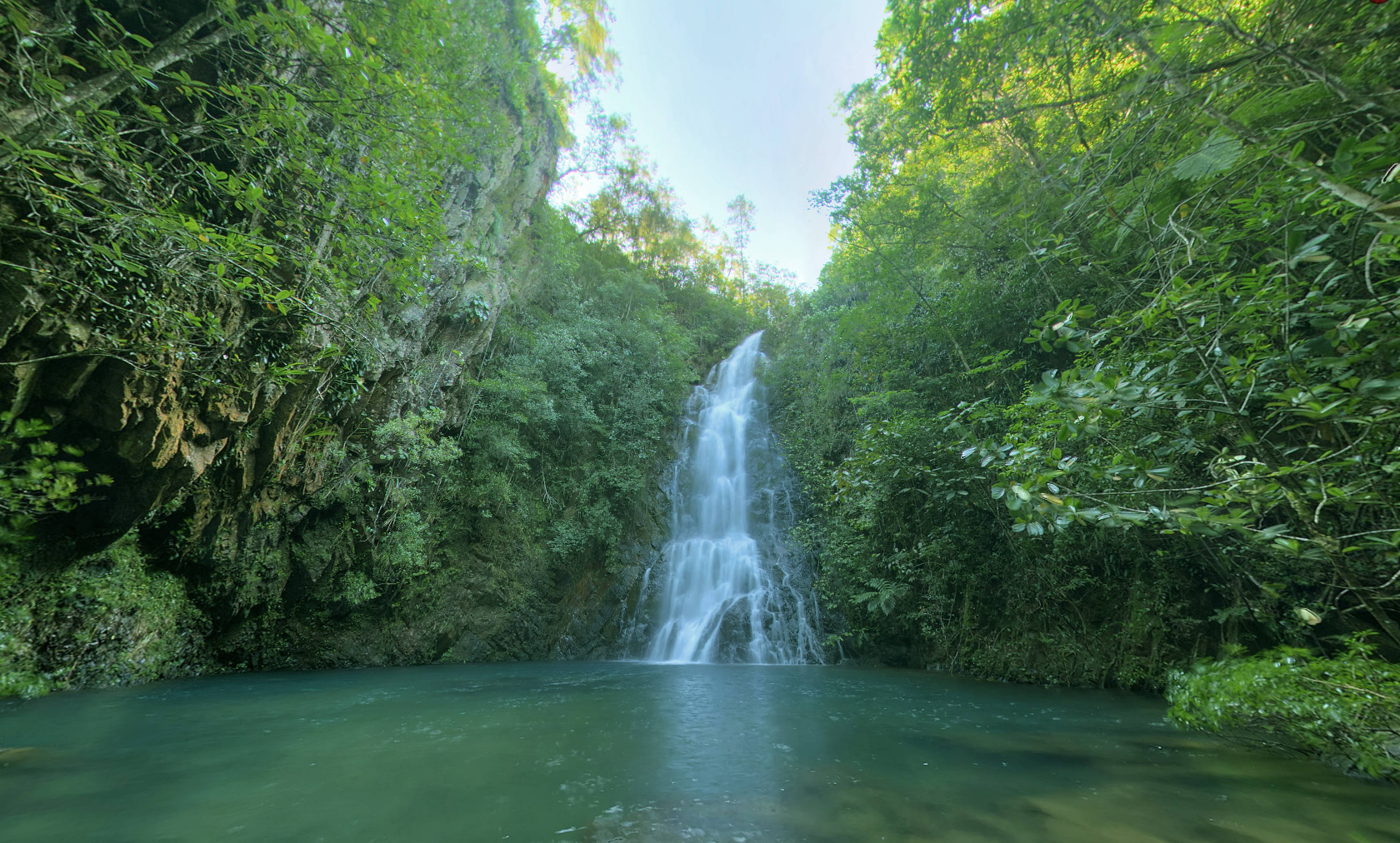
Cockscomb Basin Wildlife Sanctuary was the world's first jaguar preserve, and is regarded as one of the most important areas for the conservation of the species.

Jaguars require a large, undisturbed territory with a high density of prey. For this reason, the species is coming increasingly under pressure from the expanding human impact on its environment. In 2005, Jan Meerman, the leading biologist in the government's conservation review committee, wrote:

Increasingly it becomes obvious that the long-term survival of jaguars in close proximity to human habitation and activities is unlikely. More and more the species will be driven back to the last 'wild areas' of the country.

Meerman's terminology was derived from a 2004 study by the Wildlife Conservation Society (WCS), which identified two remaining "wild areas" in Belize:

- the Maya Mountains–Chiquibul–Cockscomb (southern) block (1,290,000 acres/520,000 hectares), which is isolated, and
- the Rio Bravo–Gallon Jug–Yalbac (northern) block (470,000 acres/190,000 hectares), which neighbours larger wilderness areas in Guatemala and southern México.

This amounts to total area of approximately 1,760,000 acres (710,000 ha). Because of the minimal human presence in these areas, it is probable that they will become the last strongholds of the jaguar within Belize. A state-sponsored analysis in 2005 estimated the population of adult jaguars within these two blocks to be around 400 and 200 respectively. A 2002 study by the National Autonomous University of Mexico concluded that for the long-term survival of jaguar populations, the minimum population should not fall below 650 adult individuals. Based on this, the last two potential strongholds for jaguars in Belize are—independently—insufficient to allow for conservation of the species in the long term. The survival of the population will therefore strongly depend on the preservation of narrow corridors allowing inter-migrations of jaguar populations from other areas, and in the northern block, the continued connection to adjacent populations across the border. The maintenance of a high-density prey base will also be an important factor.

Surveys conducted in 2004 by the WCS calculated the average density of jaguars in three of the country's protected areas:

- Cockscomb Basin area (39,290 acres/15,900 hectares): 1 jaguar per 2,806 acres/1136 hectares
- Chiquibul area (26,440 acres/10,700 hectares): 1 jaguar per 3,633 acres/1471 hectares
- Gallon Jug area (48,185 acres/19,500 hectares): 1 jaguar per 2,186 acres/885 hectares

The first of these, Cockscomb Basin Wildlife Sanctuary, was declared in February 1986 the world's first jaguar preserve. Hunting has been prohibited in the area since 1984. Prior to its recent expansion, the reserve contained the highest density of jaguars ever recorded, and is regarded as one of the most important areas for the conservation of the species.

=== Manatee ===
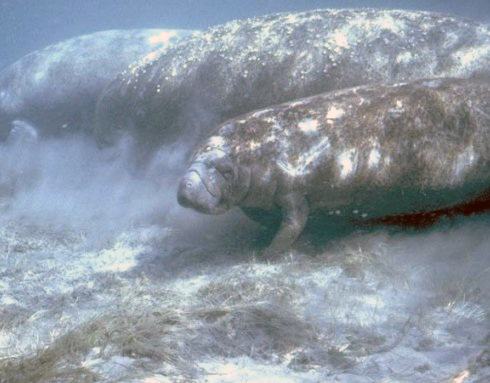
A pair of manatees feeding on sea grass

The Antillean manatee, a subspecies of Trichechus manatus, is sparsely distributed throughout the Caribbean. They are threatened by loss of habitat, poaching, entanglement with fishing gear, and increased boating activity. In Belize, manatee distribution principally coincides with 4 protected areas, at least 3 of which were declared specifically for the conservation of this species:

- Corozal Bay Wildlife Sanctuary
- Swallow Caye Wildlife Sanctuary
- Gales Point Wildlife Sanctuary
- Port Honduras Marine Reserve

Collectively, these areas cover approximately 55% of the significant manatee distribution within Belize.

=== Grouper ===
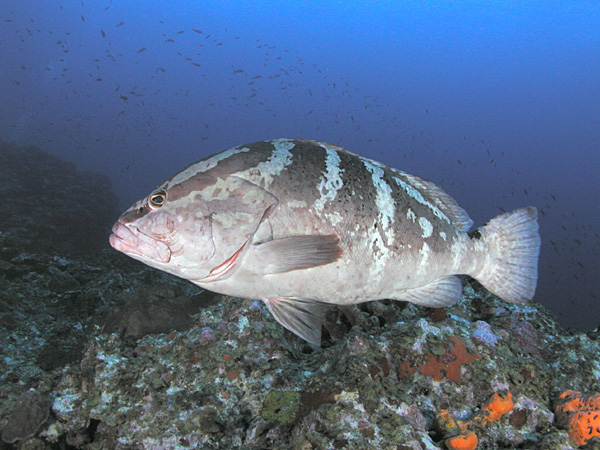
Glover's Reef Marine Reserve protects one of only two viable spawning sites remaining of the endangered Nassau grouper.

Belize's maritime territory is home to 13 species of grouper. Surveys conducted by the Green Reef Environmental Institute in 2001 and 2002 concluded that local populations of grouper were in rapid decline, and all species of grouper native to Belize are now considered "conservation dependent".

Highly prized by fishermen, groupers once constituted one of the most commercially valuable exports of Belize. Annual spawning aggregations at specific times and locations have made the species highly vulnerable to over-fishing. Fertile females contain sacks of roe that sell for up to four times more per pound than the actual fish itself, meaning that in many cases individuals will be removed before they have had the chance to reproduce. Belize is one of the few Caribbean countries that still allow for these species to be fished.

Representative of the trend in grouper populations throughout the Caribbean is the endemic and now-endangered Nassau grouper (Epinephelus striatus), once one of the most commonly caught fishes in Belize. About one-third of the spawning aggregations sites for this species have disappeared due to over-fishing. Annual spawning occurs in specific locations on the outer reef shelf during the days around the full moon of December and January. Aggregations can range anywhere from a dozen to up to several thousand adult individuals and are usually in the same site each year, making an easy target for fishermen. This intensive harvesting of reproductively active individuals, often before they have had the chance to spawn, has resulted in a marked decline in both abundance and size. One site for example, Caye Glory, historically provided a catch of up to 1,200–1,800 Nassau groupers per boat per spawning season during the 1960s. In 2001, at the same site, fishers caught just 9 individuals out of an aggregation of 21 groupers. In addition, groupers typically take a long time to reach maturity. Because of this, over the past few years females have continued to decrease in average size, indicating that more mature females are being removed, leaving behind young females with fewer eggs.

A study in September 2002 determined that many of the spawning sites of the Nassau grouper were in fact "multi-species" aggregations with an average of between 6 and 7 species recorded at 16 sites during the January 2002 spawning season.

In November 2002, under pressure from environmental organisations, the government agreed to protect 11 of these sites from commercial fishing during the spawning season. The most significant of these are at Glover's Reef and Sandbore Caye, which have been identified as the only two viable sites remaining for the species, of nine historically known locations. At Glover's Reef, scientists documented an 80% decrease in grouper populations since the 1970s. In 2002, both the sites were declared special marine reserves, permanently closed to fishing. These and five other sites are regularly monitored by a taskforce of the Wildlife Conservation Society. Its report of the 2009 spawning season at Glover's Reef concluded that numbers were still in decline, and that the majority of the individuals recorded were immature and less than the legal minimum landing size.

In addition to the easily discernible ecological effects, there are serious economic impacts on local communities when fish stock are depleted. A study in January 2001 estimated that the value of the largest spawning aggregation sites, if fished, would be realised and exhausted within a decade, since the species would disappear with low chances of recovery. Attempts in the past to close the sites to fishing failed because some denied that the species was in decline, arguing that it simply relocates its aggregations from year to year. Following the Green Reef surveys, however, the closure and monitoring of remaining known aggregation sites was seen as essential to ensure their long-term viability, and subsequently the survival of both the species and the fishing industry that depends on it.

== Vegetation ==
Belize is widely regarded by experts as a highly forested country, often cited as having the highest percentage of forest cover in Central America. A study completed in 1996 determined, however, that the country's forest cover has been in decline. The clearing of land for agricultural and urban development has had a quantifiable impact on vegetation cover, as have forest fires. However, in the context of the wider region, Belize's deforestation rates are relatively low, due to a lower population density, a more urbanised population, and a history of protecting its forests.

Forest cover facts:

- Total forest area: 3,374,612 acres (13,657 km^{2})
- % of land area: 62.7%

- Primary forest cover: 2,838,267 acres (11,486 km^{2})
- % of land area: 20.9%
- % total forest area: 34.0%

Studies conducted by various researchers estimate that between 1989 and 1994, forest covered between 65 and 67% of the country's total area; although one earlier study put the figure at over 74%. Prior to this, the extent of Belize's forests remains largely unknown. In 1959, a map was published estimating Belize's natural vegetation prior to colonial settlement of the territory, which showed forest cover at almost 89%. In 2004, it was approximated at around 62%, meaning that in the ten-year period between 1994 and 2004, the country lost a total of 561,473 hectares of forest cover.

A study conducted in 2010 by SERVIR (Sistema Regional de Visualización y Monitoreo) and CATHALAC (Centro del Agua del Trópico Húmedo para América Latina y El Caribe), retrospectively estimated the country's total forest cover datasets for 1980, 1989, 1994, 2000, 2004 and 2010. It drew on data from previous studies, but used remote sensing, and was recognised by the intergovernmental Group on Earth Observations (GEO), of which Belize is a member. It reported that in mid-November 1980, Belize had around 4,200,000 acres (17,000 km^{2}) (75.9%) of forest cover, which declined to 3,400,000 acres (14,000 km^{2}) (62.7%) by late February 2010. This concluded that over the thirty-year period, 725,173 acres (2,934.67 km^{2}) (17.4%) of the country's total forest area in 1980 had been lost by 2010, representing an average annual deforestation rate of 24,835 acres (100.50 km^{2}) (0.6%) per year. It also concluded that the period with the highest average annual deforestation rate was 2000-2004, at 71,960 acres (291.2 km^{2}) per year. This slowed to 15,101 acres (61.11 km^{2}) per year in the subsequent period 2004-2010, which recorded the second lowest rate after 1980-1989.

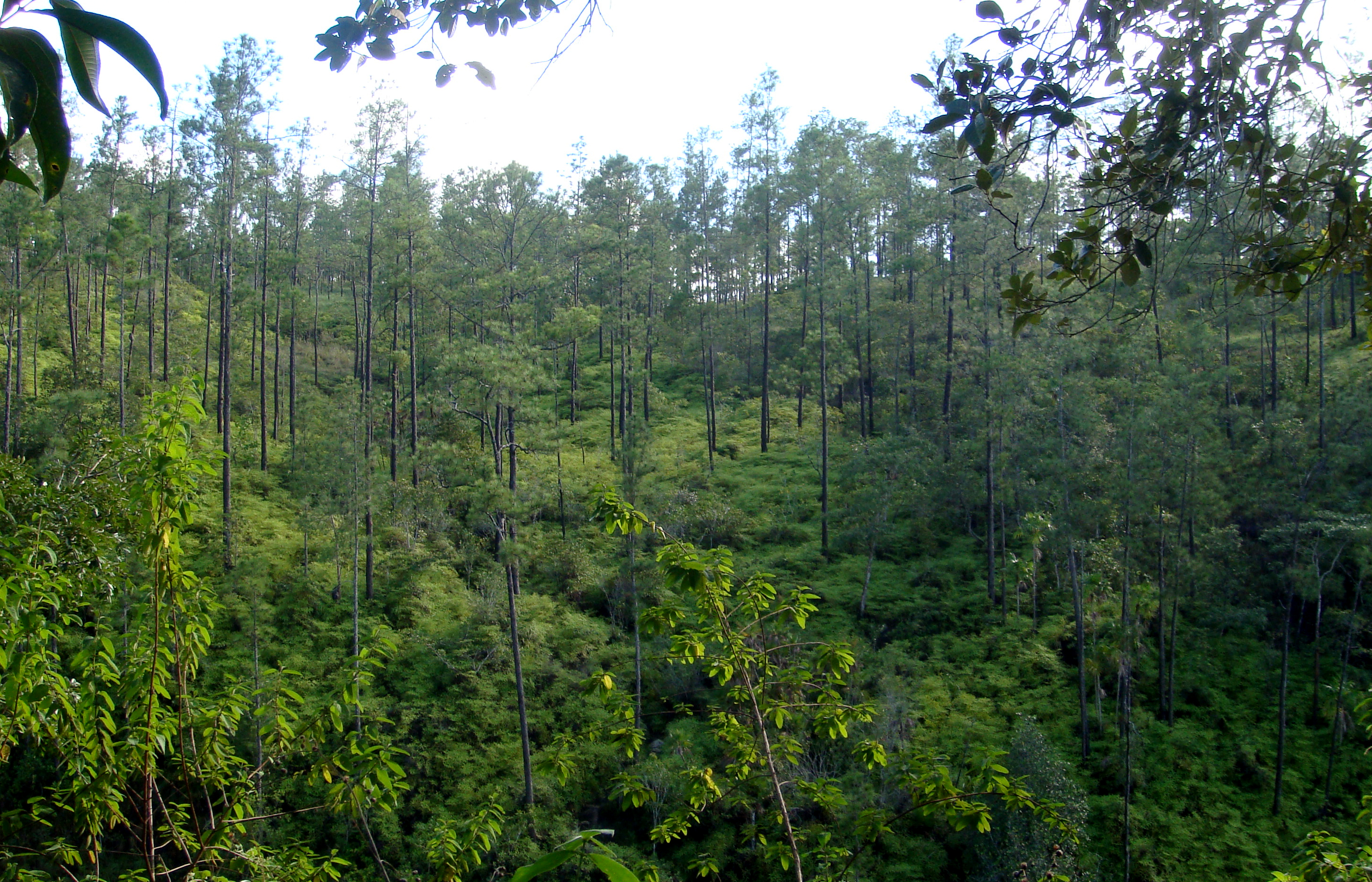
Pinus hondurensis forest in northern Belize

The same study found that, throughout the period researched, the Cayo district remained the most forested region both relatively and in plain quantity. It also, however, recorded a greater absolute loss than any other district, while Corozal had the highest relative loss, with almost a third of the forest which had existed there in 1980 being razed by 2010 due to agricultural expansion.

Perhaps the most compelling finding of the study was that, over the thirty-year period studied, only 15% of deforestation occurred in protected areas, while 85% occurred outside.

This estimation of Belize's current stock of forest carbon at over 300 million tons allows the country to fulfil one of the criteria for the REDD initiative (Reducing Emissions from Deforestation and Forest Degradation). Belize is a signatory to a number of multilateral environmental agreements requiring the regular monitoring of national forest cover and overall land use.

=== Sustainable logging ===
In 1993, the Forestry Department estimated that Belize had 2,481,897 acres (1,004,388 ha) of land with potential for timber extraction. Of this only 409,939 acres (165,896 ha) or 14% was within forest reserves. The most recent study, in 2005, approximated the exploitable forest cover as 2,616,300 acres (1,058,800 ha), of which 437,400 acres (177,000 ha) or 17% was in forest reserves. In both studies, slopped areas with a gradient of over 10% were excluded.

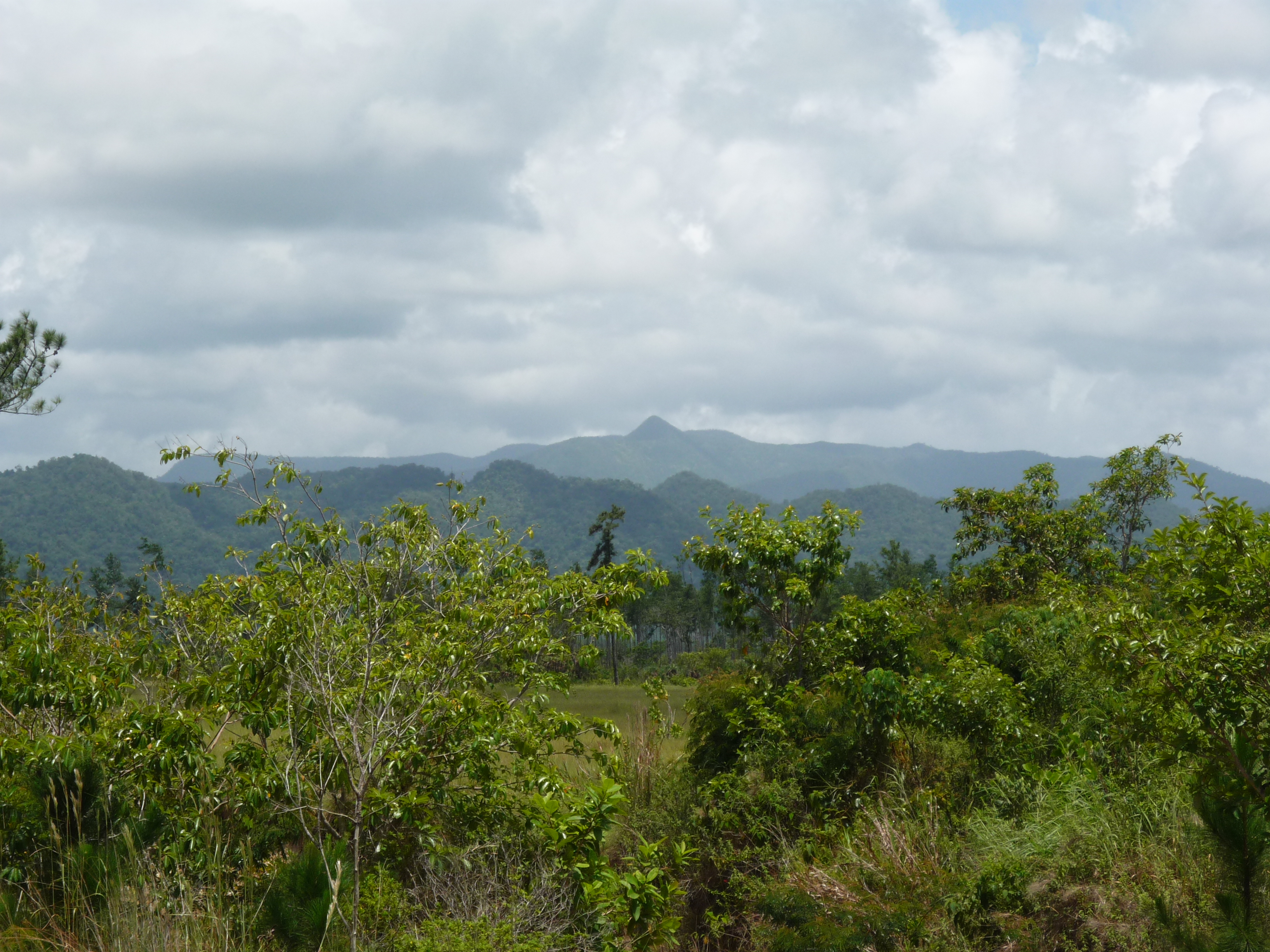
The Maya Mountains contain the majority of Belize's endemic plant species.

The later study also noted that a large percentage of extractable timber reserves were located on private land. Therefore, the presence of a sustainable logging industry in Belize largely depends on landowners keeping forests intact and managing the land for sustainable timber extraction. However, the study noted that under the current Land Tax, there is an enormous disincentive for this.

=== Endemic flora ===
Floral species endemic to Belize are few, given the country's small size. One endemic species of cycad known as Zamia prasina is considered endemic to remote areas of the Maya Mountains, in southwest Belize. IUCN assessment reported that populations were trending towards decline, and that less than 100 plants were known, which prompted the Belizean government to take measures for its conservation. Other endemic species include Schippia concolor and Dorstenia belizensis.

== See also ==
- Fauna of Belize
- Flora of Belize
