= Belize Audubon Society =

Environmental organisation in Belize

- Abbreviation: BAS
- Named after: John James Audubon
- Established: 1969
- Founder: Dora Weyer
- Type: Audubon movement
- Headquarters: 16 North Park Street; Belize City, Belize
- Coordinates: 17.4950352°N 88.1819086°W
- Origins: Florida Audubon spinoff
- Region served: Belize
- President: Kevin Geban
- Executive Director: Amanda Acosta
- Publication: BAS Bulletin
- Award: James A. Waight Award
- Website: belizeaudubon.org

The Belize Audubon Society is a conservation group in Belize, formed in 1969. Like similar societies elsewhere, it is named in honor of ornithologist and naturalist John James Audubon.

== History ==
The Belize Audubon Society was formed in 1969 by Dora Weyer and a group of conservationists. The Society was formed with a vision to inspire people to live in harmony with and benefit from the environment. The first president of the Belize Audubon Society, James A. Waight, served from 1969 until 1986. He was born in Belize City and was the Surveyor General of Belize. His dedication to the Belize Audubon Society is honored by an annual award for services to conservation in Belize called the James A. Waight Award. The Belize Audubon Society aims at conserving and protecting wildlife in Belize for the benefit of humanity and the earth's biological diversity. In 1973 the society's first launched conservation project, the Jabiru stork, was added to Belize's list of protected species.

== Board of directors ==
The responsibilities of the Board of Directors of the Belize Audubon Society include policy setting, fiscal guidance, and governance of the society. The Board is composed of 15 voluntary members. These members are elected from general membership during the Annual General Meeting, which is held no later than May 31 of each year.

The following officers make up the board:

- President
- 1st Vice President
- 2nd Vice President
- 1st Secretary
- 2nd Secretary
- 8 Directors.

== Laws Governing BAS ==
The laws of Belize that govern the operation of the Belize Audubon Society and the conservation efforts of this society are as follows:

- Wildlife Protection Act (Chp.220)
- National Parks System Act (Chp.215)
- Forest Act (Chp.213)
- Fisheries Act (Chp.210)
- Ancient Monuments and Antiquities Act (Chp.330 Rev.2000)

== Protected Areas ==
The Belize Audubon Society co-manages seven protected areas located in Belize. These protected areas are:

- Blue Hole Natural Monument
- Cockscomb Basin Wildlife Sanctuary
- Crooked Tree Wildlife Sanctuary
- Guanacaste National Park
- Half Moon Caye Natural Monument
- St. Herman's Blue Hole National Park
- Victoria Peak Natural Monument

== James A. Waight Award ==
The James A. Waight award is presented on February 16 each year to individuals or organizations in recognition for their work in the protection and enhancement of Belize's natural environment. The award is named after the Belize Audubon Society's first president.

=== Selection Criteria ===
Nominees of the award must meet the following criteria:

- Must be a Belizean or currently reside in Belize.
- Members of the Belize Audubon Society are preferred. Otherwise nominee must be involved in work directly related to the environment.
- Nominee must be involved in rainforest protection, coastal zone protection, pollution control, waste management, eco tourism promotion and the socioeconomic environment, indigenous rights, and socio-cultural protection.
- The efforts of the nominees must be national in scope, have a human dimension, and be innovative or non-traditional.

== See also ==
- Conservation in Belize
- National Audubon Society (U.S.)
