= List of amphibians of Belize =

This is a list of amphibians found in Belize. 37 amphibian species have been recorded in Belize. This list is derived from the database listing of AmphibiaWeb.

== Salamanders (Caudata) ==
=== Caudata ===
Order: Caudata – Family: Plethodontidae

- Bolitoglossa mexicana (LC)
- Oedipina elongata (LC)

== Frogs and toads (Anura) ==
=== Bufonidae ===
Order: Anura – Family: Bufonidae

- Incilius campbelli (LC)
- Incilius valliceps (LC)
- Rhinella marina (LC)

=== Centrolenidae ===
Order: Anura – Family: Centrolenidae

- Hyalinobatrachium fleischmanni (LC)

=== Craugastoridae ===
Order: Anura – Family: Craugastoridae

- Craugastor chac (NT)
- Craugastor laticeps (NT)
- Craugastor loki (LC)
- Craugastor psephosypharus (VU)
- Craugastor rhodopis (VU)
- Craugastor sabrinus (EN)
- Craugastor sandersoni (EN)

=== Eleutherodactylidae ===
Order: Anura – Family: Eleutherodactylidae

- Eleutherodactylus leprus (VU)

=== Hylidae ===
Order: Anura – Family: Hylidae

- Agalychnis callidryas (LC)
- Agalychnis moreletii (CR)
- Bromeliohyla bromeliacia (EN)
- Dendropsophus ebraccatus (LC)
- Dendropsophus microcephalus (LC)
- Ecnomiohyla valancifer (CR)
- Scinax staufferi (LC)
- Smilisca baudinii (LC)
- Smilisca cyanosticta (NT)
- Tlalocohyla loquax (LC)
- Tlalocohyla picta (LC)
- Trachycephalus venulosus (LC)
- Triprion petasatus (LC)

=== Leptodactylidae ===
Order: Anura – Family: Leptodactylidae

- Engystomops pustulosus (LC)
- Leptodactylus fragilis (LC)
- Leptodactylus melanonotus (LC)

=== Microhylidae ===
Order: Anura – Family: Microhylidae

- Gastrophryne elegans (LC)
- Hypopachus variolosus (LC)

=== Ranidae ===
Order: Anura – Family: Ranidae

- Rana berlandieri (LC)
- Rana juliani (NT)
- Rana maculata (LC)
- Rana vaillanti (LC)

=== Rhinophrynidae ===
Order: Anura – Family: Rhinophrynidae

- Rhinophrynus dorsalis (LC)

== See also ==
- Fauna of Belize
