= St. Herman's Blue Hole National Park =

National park in Belize

Coordinates: 17.156°N 88.685°W

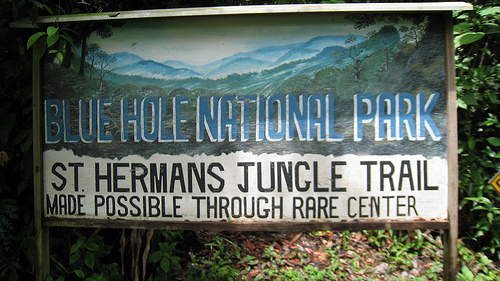
Welcome Sign to the Blue Hole National Park

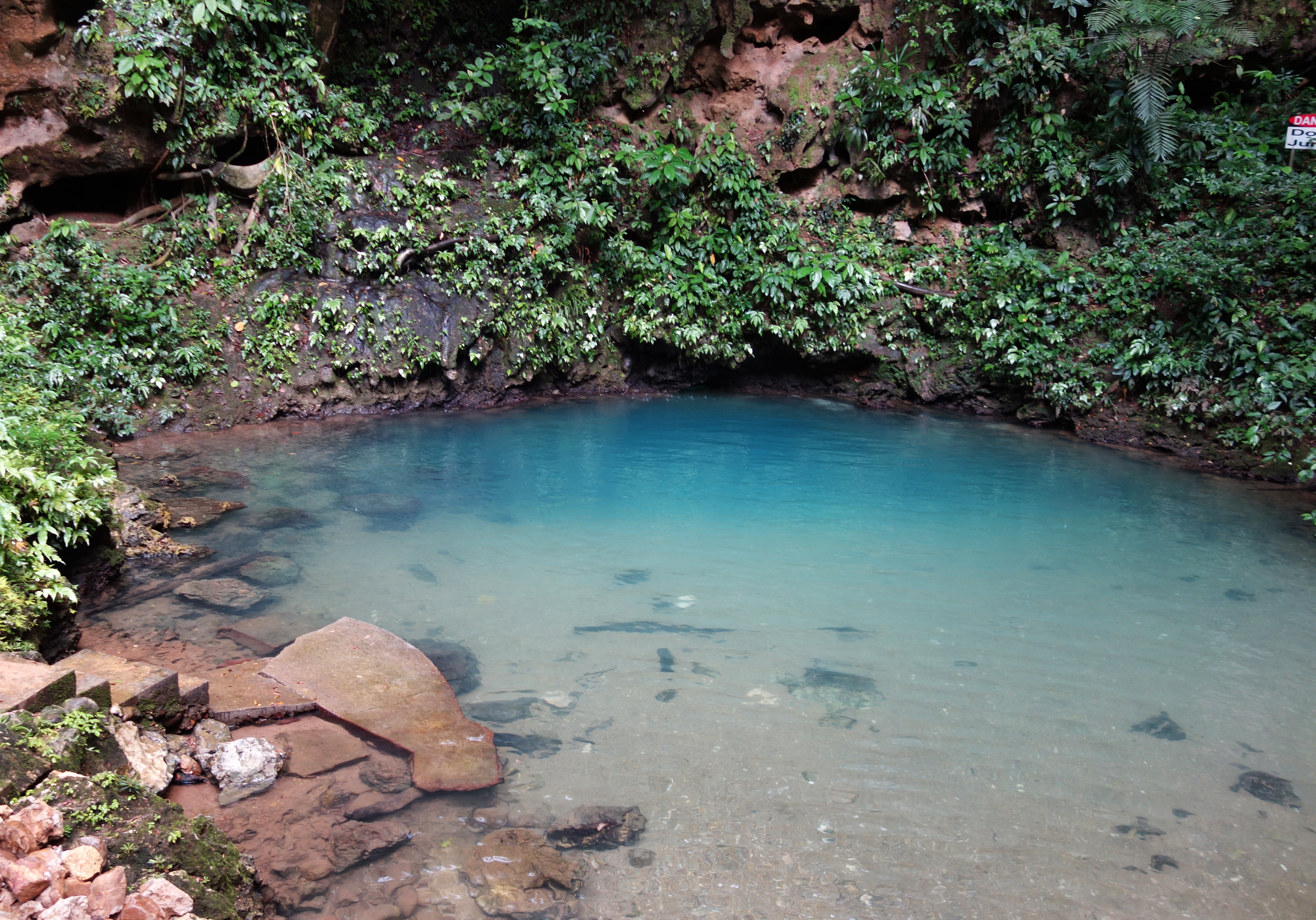
The Blue Hole

St. Herman's Blue Hole National Park is a national park located just off the Hummingbird Highway in Cayo District, 12 miles (19 km) southeast of Belmopan, the capital of Belize. It covers an area of 574.5 acres (232.5 ha) and contains two cave systems (St. Herman's and Crystal) and a jungle pool called the Blue Hole for its vivid color. The park is the responsibility of the Belize Forest Department and is managed by the Belize Audubon Society. It was designated a national park in 1986.

== History ==
The Government of Belize acquired the land for the park in the 1960s and '70s. It was officially declared a national park on 23 November 1986. The park was originally named Blue Hole National Park, but its name was changed in 2005 in order to avoid confusion with Blue Hole National Monument, which is also in Belize.

== Geography and archaeology ==
It is part of the foothills of the Maya Mountains. The park is on a forested ridge between two valleys, each with a river, the Sibun River and its tributary the Caves Branch.

St. Herman's Cave and Crystal Cave (also known as Mountain Cow Cave) each have an extensive cave system that can be explored by spelunkers. Archaeologists have found artifacts, sacrificial sites and other evidence that both caves were used by the Maya civilization during its Classic Period.

A subterranean river or stream flows through St. Herman's Cave into a cenote about 100 feet (30 m) deep and 300 feet (91 m) in diameter, before going underground again; the Blue Hole is located at the bottom of the cenote. The Blue Hole has a sapphire blue color and is about 25 feet (7.6 m) deep.

== Flora and fauna ==
The park has around 280 species of birds, including the great curassow and crested guan, as well as unusual tropical species such as the slaty antwren, piratic flycatcher and red-legged honeycreeper. Species considered local specialties are the tody motmot and northern nightingale-wren. The cerulean warbler is classified as vulnerable.

The ocelot, jaguarundi, jaguar, tapir, collared and white-lipped peccary, tamandua anteater, paca (called "gibnut" in Belize), coatimundi, opossum, deer, kinkajou and many bat species have all been spotted within the park.

Endangered species are:

- Yucatán black howler
- Geoffroy's spider monkey
- Sabrinus rainfrog
- Baird's tapir

The Leprus chirping frog is classed as vulnerable.

It has two forest ecosystem types: tropical evergreen seasonal broad-leaved lowland hill forest on steep karstic terrain and on rolling karstic terrain. The yaxnik or yax-nik is an endangered plant species, while mahogany and Mexican cedar are considered vulnerable.
