= Aguacate Lagoon =

Lake in Belize

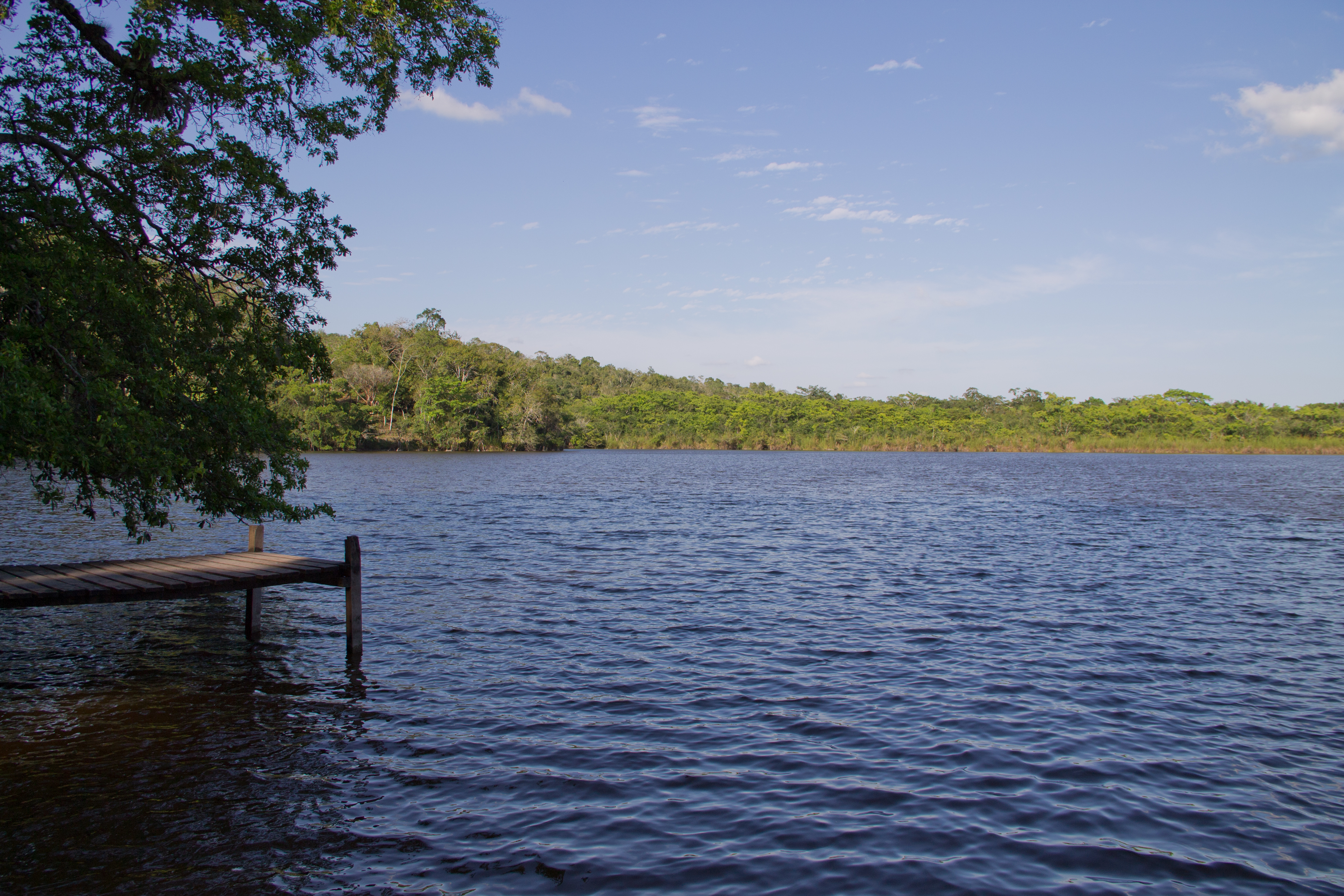

- Coordinates: 17°19′18.98″N 89°4′22″W

Aguacate Lagoon is a lake and private reserve located in Western Belize, near the Mennonite community Spanish Lookout. The Lagoon is an herbaceous swamp with permanent waterlogged vegetation. The estimated terrain elevation above sea level is 96 metres. The reserve is approximately 284 acres.

== History ==
In 1958 the Mennonites were the first group of people to move and settle around the Spanish Lookout area from the Northern part of Mexico. They settled as farmers. In the 1960s, agriculture made strides at Spanish Lookout. "Aguacate" is Spanish for avocado, and there are countless avocado trees located at the reserve; it is believed that is how the lagoon got its name. The area was officially declared a private reserve in 1987 and it is managed by the Aguacate Park officials.

== See also ==
- Community Baboon Sanctuary
- Río Bravo Conservation and Management Area
- Conservation in Belize
