= Programme for Belize =

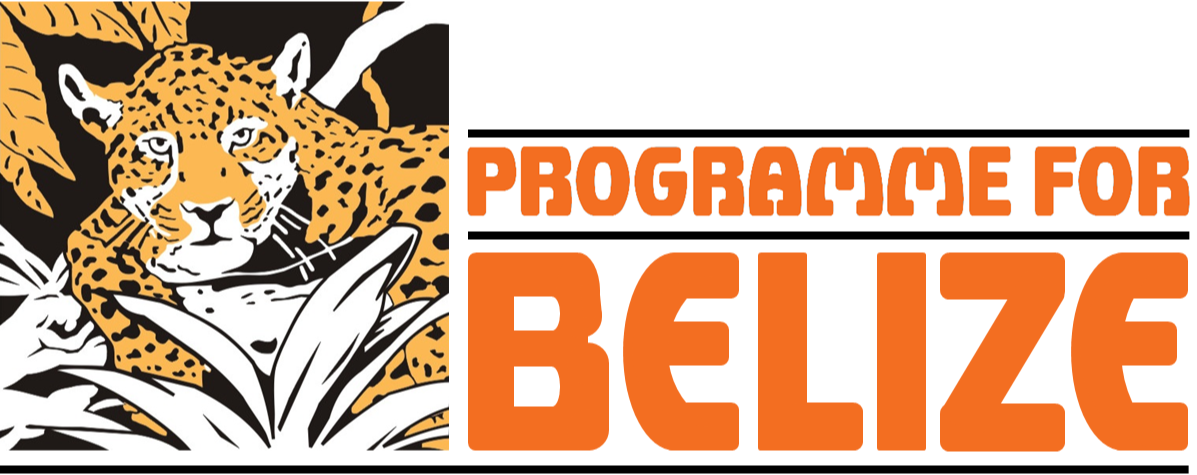
The logo of the project featuring a Jaguar.

The Programme for Belize (abbreviated as PfB or PFB) is a private initiative, established in 1988 by Ben Campbell and Arnold Brown. Massachusetts Audubon Society generously provided financial support and management guidance to identify boundaries of the property, successfully maneuver governmental requirements, and effect the purchase of over 300,000 acres of tropical forest in Belize. Loans were given to PfB by The Nature Conservancy. The World Land Trust helped PfB raise funds to reduce the debt. Many other eco-driven organizations have helped raise funds to maintain and protect the property.

The current executive director of Programme for Belize is Edilberto Romero.

== Activities ==
The Programme for Belize has established a protection programme of twelve rangers for the Rio Bravo Conservation and Management Area that protect three of the major entrances and patrol the boundaries of the reserve. The Rio Bravo area, roughly 4% of Belize's total land area, is 262,000 of tropical forest in the northern part of Belize and includes facilities for visitors and researchers.

In April 2022, PfB received a grant of $150,000 from the environmental organization, Global Conservation, to support the protection and patrolling of the Greater Belize Maya Forest, which composes roughly 10% of the total land area of Belize. The Greater Belize Maya Forest conservation project is supported by numerous other conservation and environmental groups including the University of Belize's Environmental Research Institute, the Cornell Lab of Ornithology, and the Rainforest Trust, among others.

== See also ==
- Conservation in Belize
