= Aguacaliente Wildlife Sanctuary =

Nature reserve in Toledo District, Belize

- IUCN category IV (habitat/species management area)
- Location within Belize
- Location: Toledo District, Belize
- Coordinates: 16°08′22″N 89°10′21″W
- Area: 5,492 acres (22 km^{2})
- Established: 1998
- Governing body: Co-managed by Aguacaliente Management Team

The Aguacaliente Wildlife Sanctuary is a nature reserve in the Toledo District of southern Belize. It encompasses approximately 5,492 acres (22.23 km^{2}) and was declared a sanctuary in 1998. It encompasses a unique wetland ecosystem, featuring freshwater lagoons and a distinctive hot spring, all interconnected by various creeks, which give the sanctuary its name "Aguacaliente" (Spanish for "hot water"). The sanctuary is one of the critical protected areas for the preservation of biodiversity in the region and serves as a critical habitat for a wide array of wildlife, particularly numerous bird species, including endangered ones, that utilize the lagoons for feeding and as a migratory stopover.

== History ==
The need for protection of the region was identified through studies in the early to mid-1990s, which highlighted the area's significant ecological importance. An Aguacaliente Management Team (AMT) was formed during the declaration process, with representation from ten adjacent communities that have a direct or indirect interest in the wetland. The Aguacaliente Wildlife Sanctuary was formally established in 1998 through Statutory Instrument No. 87. Its declaration was largely a requirement of the Environmental and Social Technical Assistance Project (ESTAP), which aimed to explore means of providing formal protection to the area.

== Geography ==
The Aguacaliente Wildlife Sanctuary is located in the Toledo District of southern Belize. It is situated in the central part of the western Toledo District, forming the core of an extensive wetland. The sanctuary encompasses approximately 5,492 acres (2,223 ha). The area is characterized by a barrier of rolling lands and karst hills that detain the flow of waters from various creeks as they pass towards the Moho River. The sanctuary's boundaries were specifically drawn to include the most sensitive parts of the wetlands, such as its lagoons and surrounding swamp/savannah, and small hills where Aguacaliente Creek originates, while excluding agricultural land. The topography is dominated by its wetland system, featuring three main freshwater lagoons and a hot spring, interconnected by several creeks. The area forms a basin, causing much of the sanctuary and the wetland extending beyond its boundaries to become quickly inundated during the rainy season.

== Demographics ==
The Aguacaliente Wildlife Sanctuary is surrounded by a number of local communities. These communities are recognized as having a direct or indirect interest in the wetland, and representatives from these communities form the Aguacaliente Management Team (AMT), which co-manages the sanctuary. The surrounding areas to the north, west, and south of the sanctuary consist of agricultural lands.

== Flora and fauna ==
The Aguacaliente Wildlife Sanctuary is recognized as a critical area for the preservation of biodiversity in Belize, particularly due to its diverse wetland and forest habitats. The sanctuary's lagoons serve as a crucial feeding ground for hundreds of waterfowl, including important species like wood storks, endangered jabiru storks, black-bellied whistling ducks, sandpipers. Many of these birds use the sanctuary as a transmigration point during their seasonal journeys. The forested and savanna areas within the sanctuary provide habitat for a wide variety of mammals, including gibbons, peccary, howler monkeys, white-tailed deer, kinkajous, and endangered tapirs and jaguar. The seasonal flooding of the area also creates expanded breeding grounds for resident fish populations.

== See also ==
- List of protected areas of Belize
