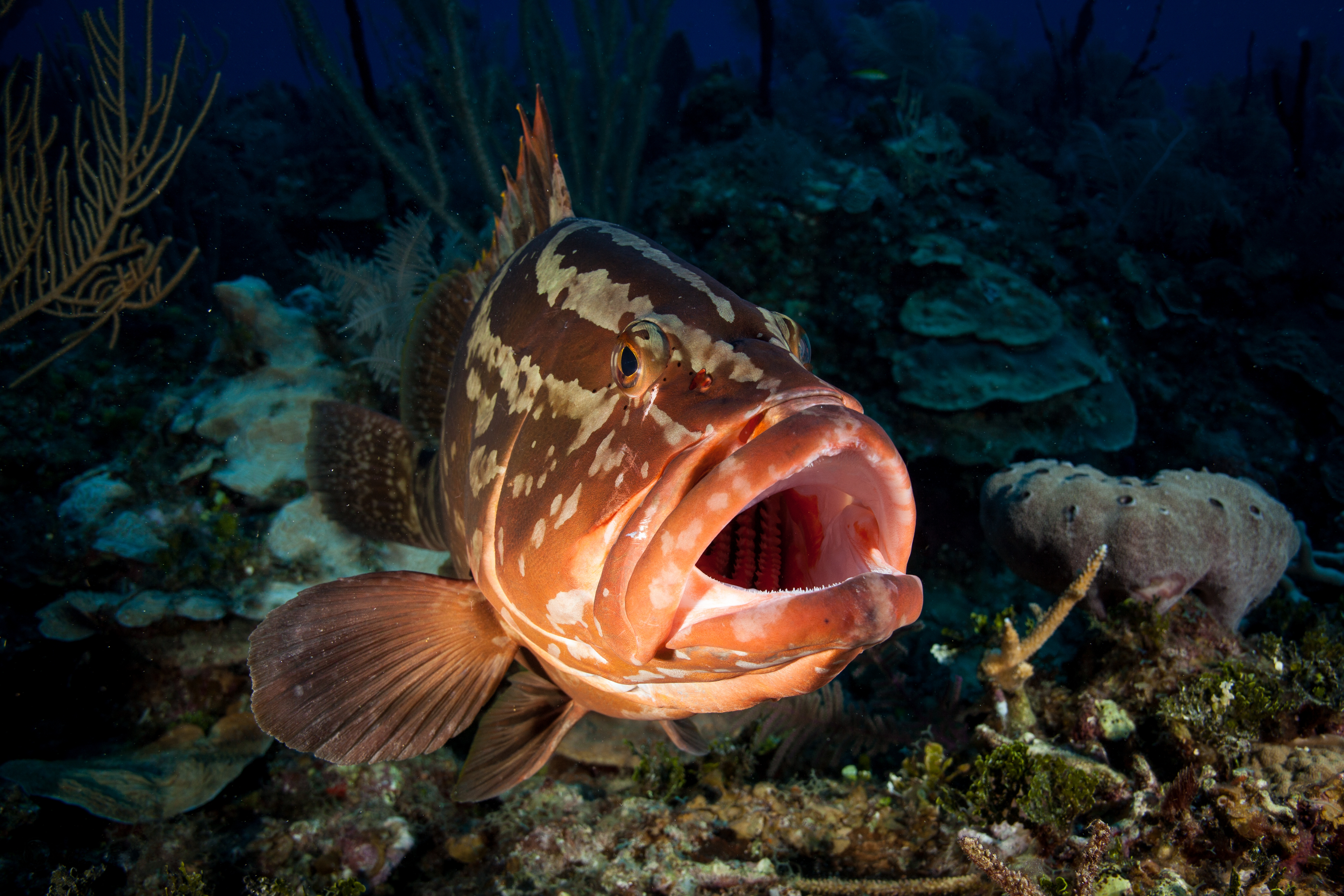

Conservation status
- Critically Endangered (IUCN 3.1)

Scientific classification
- Kingdom: Animalia
- Phylum: Chordata
- Class: Actinopterygii
- Division: Teleostei
- Order: Perciformes
- Family: Epinephelidae
- Genus: Epinephelus
- Species: E. striatus

Binomial name
- Epinephelus striatus (Bloch, 1792)

Synonyms
- Anthias striatus Bloch, 1792; Serranus striatus (Bloch, 1792); Anthias cherna Bloch & Schneider, 1801; Sparus chrysomelanus Lacépède, 1802; Serranus gymnopareius Valenciennes, 1828

= Nassau grouper =

Species of fish

The Nassau grouper (Epinephelus striatus) is one of the large number of perciform fishes in the family Serranidae commonly referred to as groupers. It is the most important of the groupers for commercial fishery in the West Indies, but has been endangered by overfishing.

The International Union for Conservation of Nature lists the Nassau grouper as critically endangered, due to commercial and recreational fishing and reef destruction. Fishing the species is prohibited in US federal waters. The Nassau grouper is a US National Marine Fisheries Service-listed threatened species by authority of the Endangered Species Act of 1973.

== Description ==
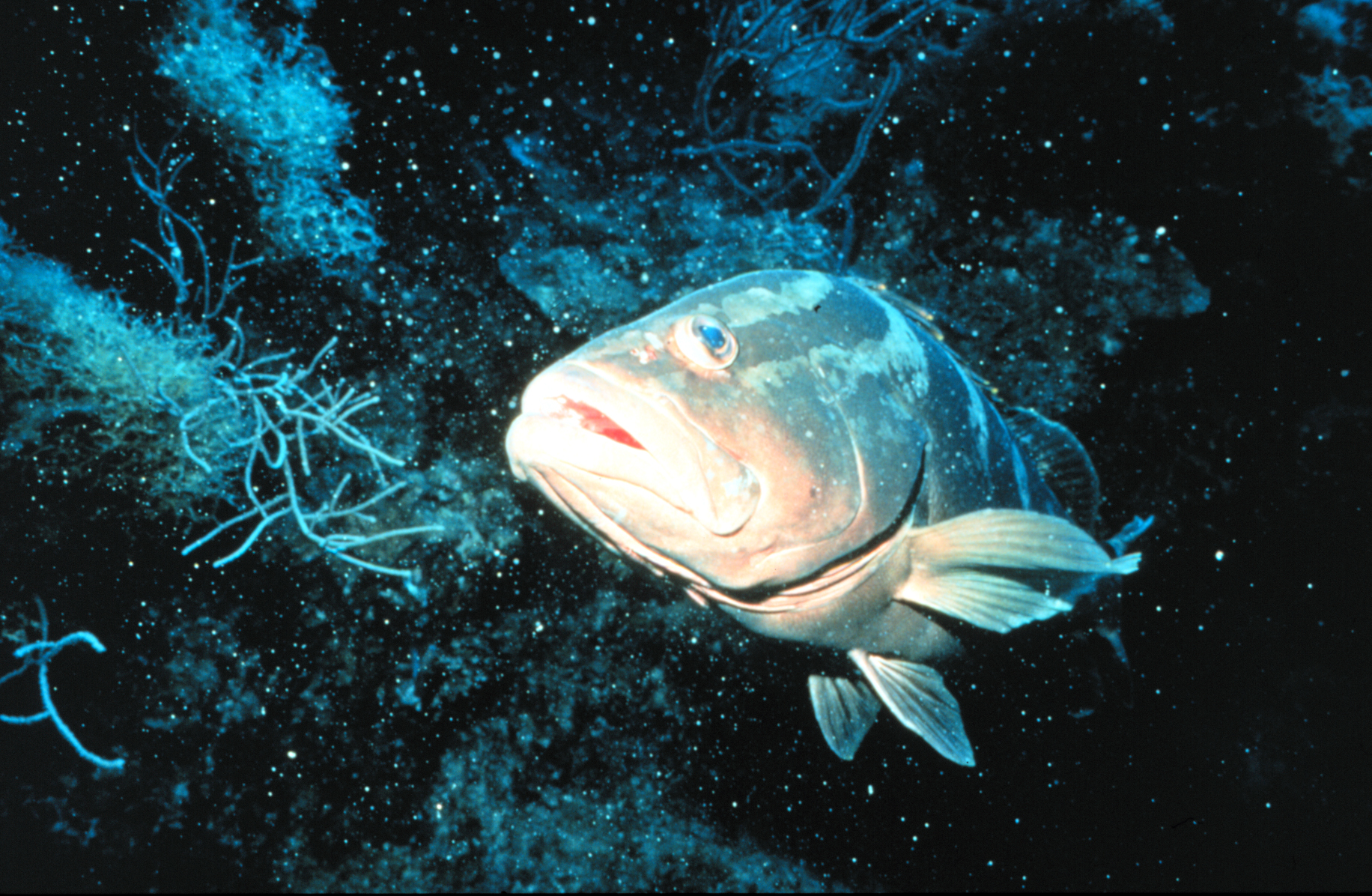
A Nassau grouper, E. striatus, ambushed its prey on Caribbean coral reefs.

The Nassau grouper is a medium to large fish, growing to over 1 m (3.3 ft) in length and up to 25 kg (55 lb) in weight. It has a thick body and large mouth, which it uses to "inhale" prey. Its color varies depending on an individual fish's circumstances and environment. In shallow water down to 60 ft (18 m), the grouper is a tawny color, but specimens living in deeper waters are pinkish or red, or sometimes orange-red in color. Superimposed on this base color are a number of lighter stripes, darker spots, bars, and patterns, including black spots below and behind the eyes, and a forked stripe on the top of the head.

== Distribution and habitat ==
The Nassau grouper lives near reefs; it is one of the largest fish to be found around coral reefs. It can be found from the shoreline to depths near 330 ft (100 m). It lives in the western Atlantic Ocean and around the Caribbean Sea, from Bermuda, Florida, and the Bahamas in the north to the eastern coast of Venezuela, but it is only found in a few places in the Gulf of Mexico, most notably along the coast of Belize.

== Biology ==
It is a solitary fish, feeding in the daytime, mainly on other fish and small crustaceans such as crabs and small lobsters. It spawns in December and January, always around the time of the full moon, and always in the same locations. By the light of the full moon, huge numbers of the grouper cluster together to mate in mass spawning.

== Conservation ==
The Nassau grouper is fished both commercially and for sport; it is less shy than other groupers, and is readily approached by scuba divers. Its numbers have been sharply reduced by overfishing in recent years, though, and it is a slow breeder. Furthermore, its historic spawning areas are easily targeted for fishing, which tends to remove the reproductively active members of the group. The species is therefore highly vulnerable to overexploitation, and is recognized as critically endangered on the IUCN Red List. The governments of the United States, the Cayman Islands, and the Bahamas have banned or instituted closed fishing seasons for the Nassau grouper in recent years. In the Cayman Islands, fishing in the spawning holes of the grouper had been banned until the end of 2016. In the case of the Bahamas, the government has instituted a closed fishing season in which fishing for the Nassau grouper is banned from December to February. It is in a very high rate of decline and is at serious risk of becoming extinct.

A large spawning site for the species is located at Glover's Reef, off the Belizean coast. It has been identified as one of only two viable sites remaining for the species, of nine originally known locations. In 2002, a permanent marine protected area was established on Glover's Reef, but the Nassau grouper's spawning region is not included in this marine protected area (MPA). Instead, their spawning area (located north of the MPA) is subjected to a three-month closure during winter spawning aggregations.

Many conservation methods have been put in place to help the grouper, including closed seasons, when fishing is not allowed. These seasons take place during the spawning season. Regulations allow only fish over 3 lb (1.4 kg) to be harvested to give the younger fish a chance to spawn. Some areas are protected, and a complete ban on fishing the grouper in US waters has been instituted. Also, protection of the spawning sites at all times is in effect in certain places.

== Status reviews ==
The U.S. National Marine Fisheries Service recently completed a review of the status of the species for endangered species listing, and proposed to list the species as endangered. However, analysis of declines in both populations, as well as the size spawning aggregations has led to the species being uplisted to critically endangered by the IUCN Red List in 2018.

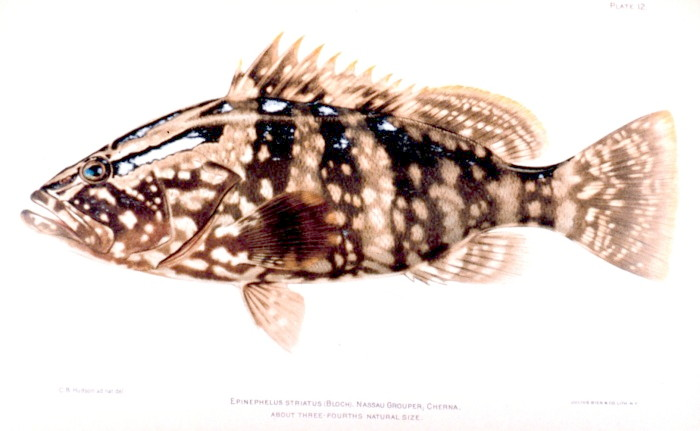
Nassau grouper

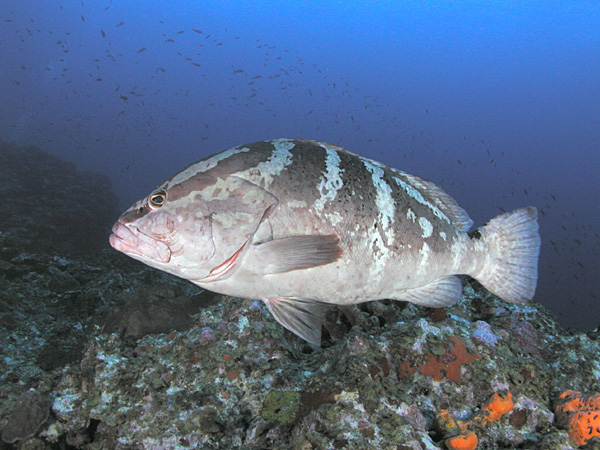
Nassau grouper in Saba

The Nassau grouper has been depicted on postage stamps of Cuba (1965, 1975), the Bahamas (1971 five-cent), and Antigua and Barbuda (1987 40-cent).

The threats to the grouper include overfishing, fishing during the breeding period, habitat loss, pollution, invasive species, and catching undersized grouper.

The Nassau grouper was placed on the World Conservation Union's red list of threatened species in 1996, and it was determined to be endangered because its population has declined by 60% in the past 30 years. An estimated third or more of spawning aggregations have disappeared, and the grouper is considered to be commercially extinct in some areas. The current population is estimated to be more than 10,000 mature individuals, but is thought to be decreasing. Their suitable habitat is declining; they need quality coral reef habitats to survive. Their population outlook is not optimistic.
