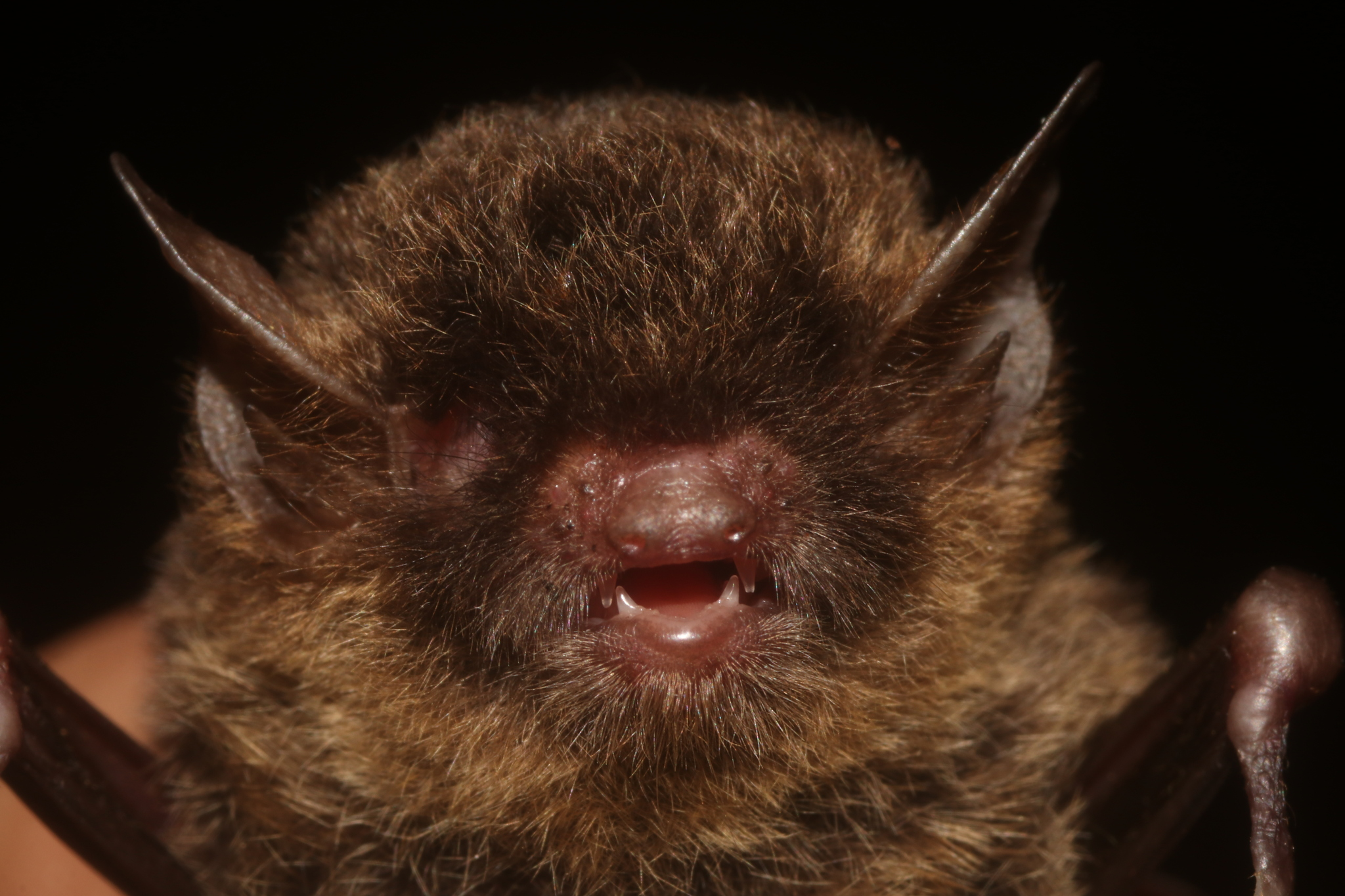

Conservation status
- Least Concern (IUCN 3.1)

Scientific classification
- Kingdom: Animalia
- Phylum: Chordata
- Class: Mammalia
- Order: Chiroptera
- Family: Vespertilionidae
- Genus: Myotis
- Species: M. elegans

Binomial name
- Myotis elegans Hall, 1962
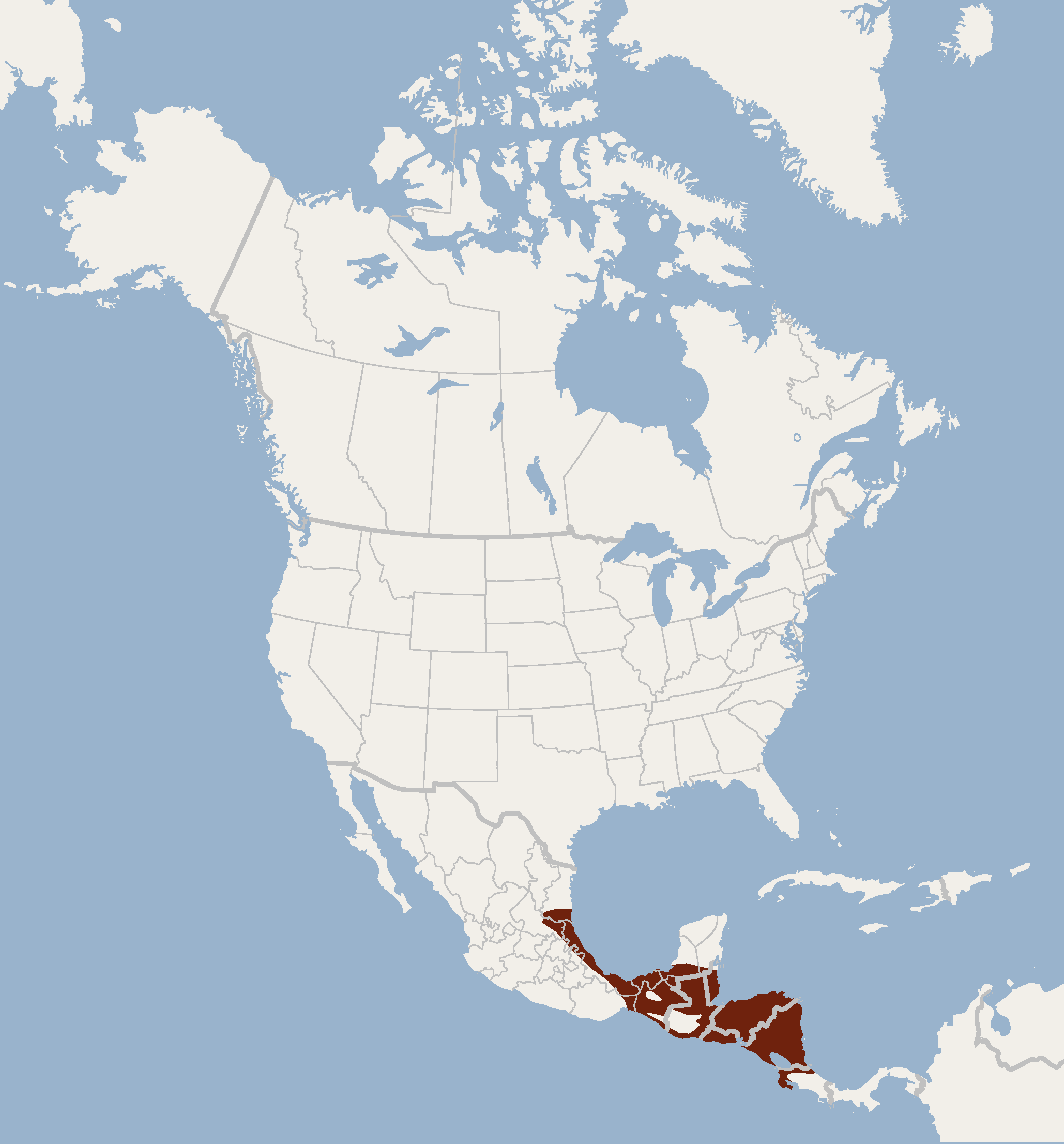

= Elegant myotis =

Species of bat

The elegant myotis (Myotis elegans) is a species of vesper bat found in Belize, Costa Rica, El Salvador, Guatemala, Honduras, Mexico, and Nicaragua.

== Description ==
The elegant myotis is a small bat, with a body weight of about 4 g. Its fur is brown on the dorsal side while the ventral side is lighter and golden. Its ears are pale brown, and its flight membranes are slightly darker than its fur. The ears feature a slender and deeply notched tragus. The following body measurements are in millimeters (mm). Total body length: 76.0, length of tail: 35.0, length of hind foot: 7.0, length of ear: 12.0, tragus: 6, forearm: 34.2, and, the greatest length of skull: 13.

When compared to the California Myotis (M. californicus) and the Western small-footed bat (M. ciliolabrum), M. elegans has a shorter tail, a more pronounced golden color on its underparts, a deeper notch in their tragus, and a shorter skull. It is further differentiated from M. ciliolabrum by its paler ears, lips, and flight membranes, shorter ears, and a more slender tragus.

Like most vesper bats, M. elegans produces short duration frequency modulated (FM) echolocation calls above 50 kHz in frequency.

== Biology and behavior ==
Little is known about the life history and behavior of the elegant bat. They are known to inhabit dry deciduous forests in El Salvador.

Based on fecal analysis, M. elegans is known to prey on insects of the Lepidoptera, Coleoptera and Diptera orders. Due to low sample size in existing studies, it is likely not a complete list of prey items for this species.
