= Audubon movement =

The Audubon movement is a collective name for the more than 500 Audubon clubs, societies, and organizations in North America, all of which take their name from the famous bird artist John James Audubon.

== Origins ==
Audubon lived from 1785 to 1851, and over the course of a lifetime roamed across a still very wild America to paint hundreds of its birds. He eventually realized his dream of not only painting North America's birds, but publishing Birds of America, a massive book containing 435 hand-colored plates of 1,065 individual birds.

Audubon became the chosen symbol for a movement begun in the late 1890s to stop the unrestricted slaughter of birds. Early Audubon society members pledged to shun the fashion-of-the-day of wearing hats and coats adorned with bird feathers and wings, and to hunt birds for consumption only, rather than sport or trade.

Early Audubon members studied birds, improved their habitats, and fought for bird protection. Their activism fledged a broader conservation movement and eventually led to passage of the Migratory Bird Treaty Act in 1918. The act ended trade in migratory birds, and was among the first federal protections ever afforded to wildlife.

== Audubon Organizations today ==
There are more than 500 Audubon organizations in the United States today. Each of these groups is independent and separately incorporated, and each is free to establish its own programs. Audubon organizations vary greatly in their scope and missions: some remain small bird clubs or societies, while others focus on state, national, or international bird conservation and environmental issues. Through a diversity of approaches, Audubon organizations today carry on the conservation ethic begun at the turn of the 20th century.

- The Massachusetts Audubon Society, with over 100,000 members, cares for 33,000 acres (130 km^{2}) of conservation land in 45 wildlife sanctuaries. The group works to protect Massachusetts for people and wildlife and promotes sound environmental policies. Founded in 1896, it has become the largest conservation organization in New England.
- The Audubon Society of New York State, established in New York in 1897, was reincorporated in 1987. An international arm created in 1996 is known as Audubon International.
- The National Audubon Society produces the well known Audubon Magazine, and is the parent of nearly 500 independent chapters.
- Audubon Lifestyles promotes sustainability by working to balance what they call the "triple bottom line" of people, profit, and planet. It offers sustainably based products and services, and proceeds are contributed to Audubon societies and other charitable organizations.
- The Audubon Institute of Louisiana is host to nearly a dozen Audubon named museums and parks that are dedicated to nature which include the Audubon Park, Audubon Zoo, Audubon Aquarium of the Americas, Audubon Louisiana Nature Center, Audubon Center for Research of Endangered Species, Audubon Wilderness Park, Audubon Insectarium, Audubon Nature Institute Foundation.

== See also ==
- List of wildlife artists
