= Rio Bravo Conservation and Management Area =

Nature reserve in Belize

The Rio Bravo Conservation and Management Area is a nature reserve located in north-western Belize.

== History ==
Rio Bravo, as it is known, was established by Programme for Belize in 1988 with the purchase of 110,044 acres (44,533.2 hectares) of land from Gallon Jug Agroindustries. With logging encroachment imminent in 1989, the Nature Conservancy joined Programme for Belize to protect the land. Additional land donations from Coca-Cola Foods, Inc. (42,007 acres in 1990 and 52,015 acres (210.50 km^{2}) in 1992) and purchases from New River Enterprises Ltd. (14,011 acres and 12,798 acres (51.79 km^{2}) both in 1994) enlarged the protected area to 230,875 acres (934.32 km^{2}). Rio Bravo is the largest terrestrial conservation area in Belize, comprising 4% of the country's total land area.

== Ecology ==
Rio Bravo is host to a wide variety of habitats including Belizean pine forest, secondary palm and broadleaf forest, marsh forest and freshwater lagoons. Surveys have recorded over 70 mammal species (greater than 50% bats) and 392 bird species (25% of which are nearctic migrants). Detailed inventories of fish and invertebrates have not yet been undertaken. Twenty-two vegetation types are encompassed by the boundaries of the conservation area, and support 230 tree species. Species of conservation concern found within the conservation area include the yellow-headed amazon, Morelet's crocodile, and the Central American river turtle.

=== Important Bird Area ===
An 175,000 ha site, comprising the Rio Bravo CMA, the Gallon Jug Estate and the Aguas Turbias National Park, has been designated an Important Bird Area (IBA) by BirdLife International because it supports significant populations of numerous resident bird species.

== Geography ==
Rio Bravo sits atop an extension of the Yucatán Platform, which is composed mostly of Cretaceous to early Pleistocene limestone, although dolomite and evaporites are also present at various depths. Alluvial sands have been deposited over the limestones over extensive areas during the Pleistocene. The principal topographical features are a series of escarpments aligned southwest-northeast, which also guide the drainage of the Rio Bravo, Booth's River and New River systems. Overall elevation of the site ranges from 4–241 m (13–791 ft).

=== Climate ===
The area is subject to a three-month dry season between February and April and a bimodal wet season with highest rainfall in June and October There are wide variations from this basic pattern between years. Annual rainfall is approximately 1,500–1,600 mm (59–63 in) per year. The coolest period is from November to January, with an average temperature range from 21–26.5C; the warmest period is April to May when average maximum temperatures rise to 31.5C. The record low is 9C and record high is 38C.

== Facilities and administration ==
Visits to Rio Bravo consist primarily of researchers and university students, though educational outreach programs to the local community also attract visitors.

=== La Milpa Field Station ===
La Milpa Field Station is situated in the northeastern portion of the reserve, only three miles from La Milpa Archaeological Site, the third largest Mayan ruin in Belize. The field station offers a "green" dormitory and four double-unit cabanas, accommodating 30 visitors. All are constructed of local hardwoods and palm thatch. Activities include: birding, forest walks, community visits, and Mayan ruin exploration.

=== Hill Bank Field Station ===
Hill Bank Field Station is situated along the south shore of the New River Lagoon, along Ramgoat Creek. Originally, the site was used as a logging camp established by British buccaneers and African slaves in the 18th century to harvest mahogany. Records show that 400 trees were extracted per year in the early days, rising to 7,000 per year in the late 1970s. Mahogany supplies dwindled quickly at that rate, and the camp was abandoned in 1982. Like La Milpa, Hill Bank has both a dormitory and a cabana, sleeping 30 visitors. Activities include forest walks, water-based activities (night crocodile spotting, river trips), frog watches, rain forest research and forestry research, the Hill Bank Reforestation Project, ranger patrols and community visits. Lamanai is about 2 hours to the north by boat.

=== Income ===
Rio Bravo receives funding from donations as well as a number of income-generating projects, including carbon credit-generating sequestration plots.

=== Ongoing research ===
Hill Bank Field Station serves as a study site for Las Golondrinas de las Americas. Nest boxes in the shallows of the lagoon house a study population of the mangrove swallow, and a vacuum insect sample sits behind the cafeteria.
