= Crooked Tree Wildlife Sanctuary =

Protected area in Belize

- Location within Belize
- Location: Belize
- Coordinates: 17.724°N 88.543°W

Ramsar Wetland
- Official name: Crooked Tree Wildlife Sanctuary
- Designated: 22 April 1998
- Reference no.: 946

Crooked Tree Wild Life Sanctuary (CTWS) is a protected area in Belize. The main goal of the sanctuary is to protect the area for the thousands of waterbirds that migrate to and through it every year.

== Environment ==
During Belize's dry season many resident and migratory birds find refuge in the lagoons. The sanctuary contains 6,600 ha (16,000 acres) of lagoons, creeks, log wood swamps, broad leaf forest and pine savanna, home to hundreds of species of wildlife. The sanctuary protects globally endangered species including the Central American river turtle (locally known as the hickatee), Yucatán black howler monkey and yellow-headed amazon.

The sanctuary, along with adjacent protected areas including the Lamanai Archaeological Reserve, Monkey Bay National Park, Runaway Creek reserve and the Manatee Forest Reserve, as well as the surrounding wetlands, form a 160,000 ha site that has been designated an Important Bird Area (IBA) by BirdLife International because it supports significant populations of many bird species.

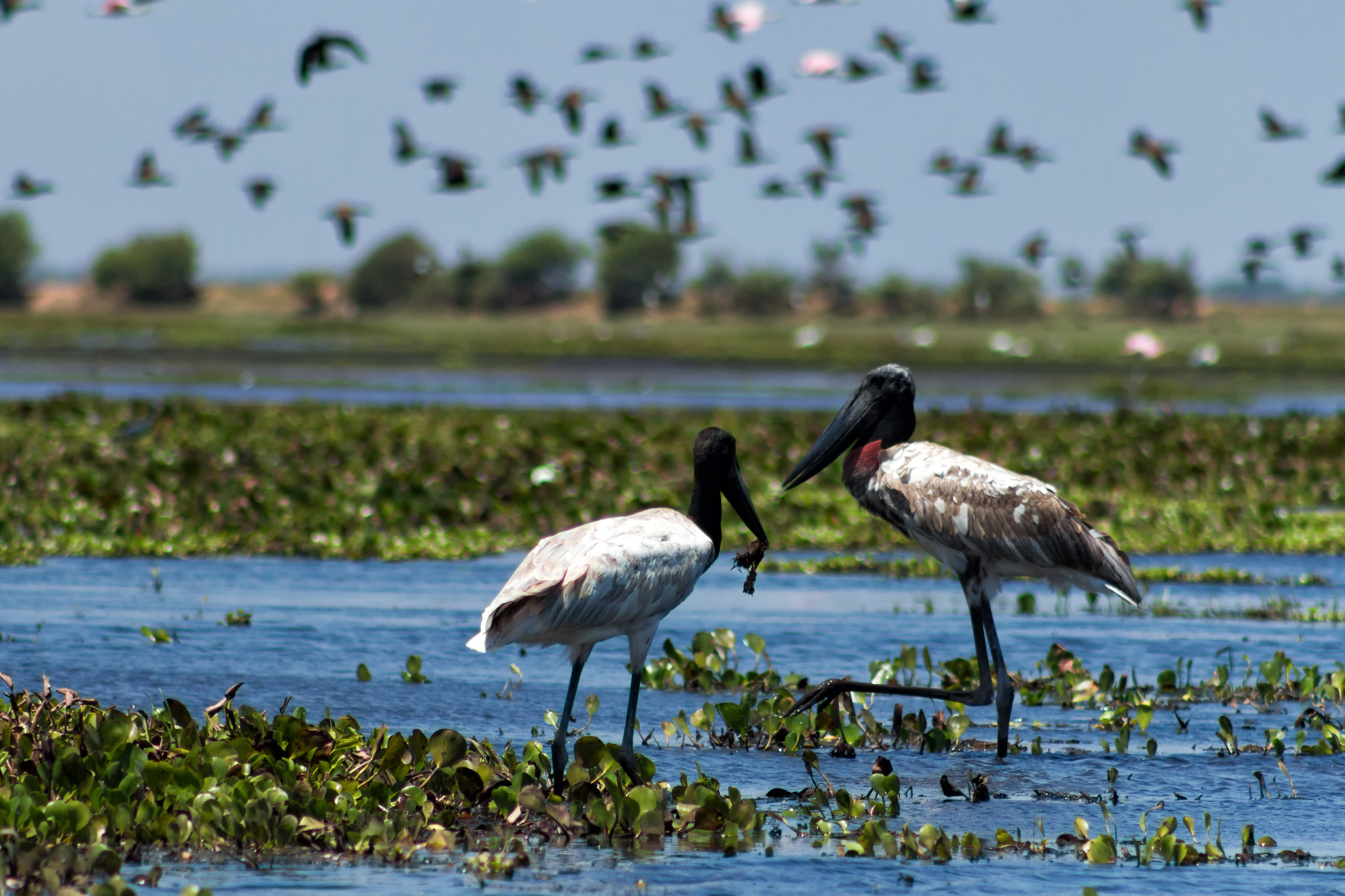
Jabiru storks at the Sanctuary

The Jabiru stork is Crooked Tree's most famous resident. Belize has the largest nesting population of these great birds in all of Central America. Jabiru storks arrive in November to nest in the lowland pine savannas. Two pairs of Jabiru storks are known to nest within the Sanctuary. After the young fledge, in April and May, the birds from the northern and central parts of Belize congregate at Crooked Tree lagoons. When the rains come, the birds leave to return again the following November.

== History ==
In March 1972, per the request of the Belize Audubon Society and with the approval of the Government of Belize, Dr Alexander Sprunt IV, Head of the U.S. National Audubon Society Field Office, came to Belize to assess Crooked Tree and make recommendations about its establishment as a wading bird reserve. In July he submitted his report and proposal for the establishment of a Natural Area Reserve at Crooked Tree Lagoon. Jabiru protection was the Belize Audubon Society's first advocacy project. In 1973 the Jabiru was added to Belize's list of protected animals. Crooked Tree Wildlife Sanctuary, the first Wildlife Sanctuary declared by the Government of Belize, was gazetted on December 8, 1984.

On August 22, 1998, Crooked Tree Wildlife Sanctuary was declared Belize's first Ramsar site based on the wetland's significance, especially as waterfowl habitat.

== Access ==
Crooked Tree Wildlife Sanctuary lies 5 kilometres (3 mi) off the Phillip Goldson Highway (Formerly Northern Highway). The junction is located midway between Belize City and Orange Walk; approximately 50 kilometres (31 mi) from either direction. Bus services are available (Monday to Saturday) from Belize City to Crooked Tree village.
