= Eleutherodactylus leprus =

Conservation status
- Least Concern (IUCN 3.1)

Scientific classification
- Kingdom: Animalia
- Phylum: Chordata
- Class: Amphibia
- Order: Anura
- Family: Eleutherodactylidae
- Genus: Eleutherodactylus
- Species: E. leprus

Binomial name
- Eleutherodactylus leprus Cope, 1879

Species of frog

Eleutherodactylus leprus is a species of frog in the family Eleutherodactylidae.

It is found in Belize, Guatemala, and Mexico. Its natural habitat is subtropical or tropical moist lowland forests. It is threatened by habitat loss.
