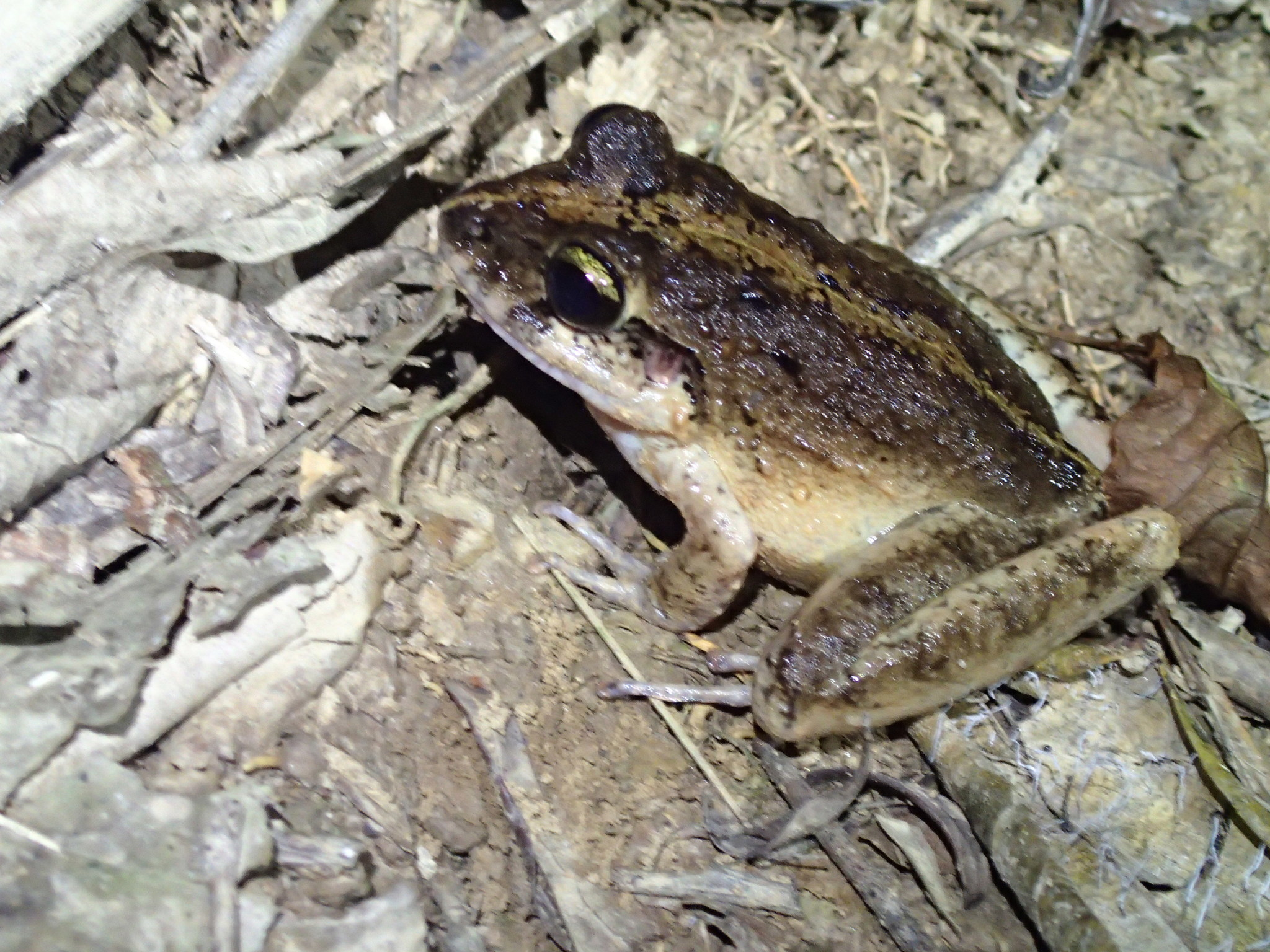
- In Stann Creek, Belize

Conservation status
- Near Threatened (IUCN 3.1)

Scientific classification
- Kingdom: Animalia
- Phylum: Chordata
- Class: Amphibia
- Order: Anura
- Family: Craugastoridae
- Genus: Craugastor
- Subgenus: Craugastor
- Species: C. sabrinus

Binomial name
- Craugastor sabrinus (Campbell and Savage, 2000)

Synonyms
- Eleutherodactylus sabrinus Campbell and Savage, 2000

= Craugastor sabrinus =

Species of frog

Craugastor sabrinus, also known as the long-legged streamfrog, is a species of frog in the family Craugastoridae. It is found in Belize and eastern Guatemala. The specific name sabrinus is derived from the Latin sabrina, meaning "river nymph", and alludes to the stream-side habitat of this species.

== Description ==
Adult males measure 38–44 mm (1.5–1.7 in) and adult females 69–83 mm (2.7–3.3 in) in snout–vent length. The canthus rostralis is moderately sharp. The tympanum is distinct. Dorsal skin is smooth–granulate, with few scattered tubercles and weak parietal and supra-scapular ridges. The finger and toe discs are moderately developed, up to 1.5 times the digit width. The fingers and the toes have well-developed lateral keels or narrow flanges; the toes are moderately webbed. The dorsum is dark olive-brown, reddish brown, or tan. A yellow, orange, or tan vertebral line or stripe is sometimes present. A dark brown interorbital is present but is often ill-defined. The larger tubercles or folds are often tan or pale brown, with black edges. Limbs have darker brown bars that are not too conspicuous. The flanks are lighter. Males have whitish throat with dark mottling; the chest is whitish, grading to yellow on the belly. Females have less yellow on the belly.

== Habitat and conservation ==
Craugastor sabrinus occurs in lowland and premontane wet and moist forests at elevations up to 900 m (3,000 ft) above sea level. It lives in and alongside pristine streams and does not occur in degraded forests, although it can be found in areas that have been farmed in the past. The eggs are laid on land and the development is direct (i.e., no free-living larval stage).

This species has declined in Guatemala but is still common in Belize. It is threatened by habitat loss, which is principally caused by agricultural development, but also by logging, hydroelectric development, oil and mineral extraction, and expanding human population. It occurs in a number of protected areas.
