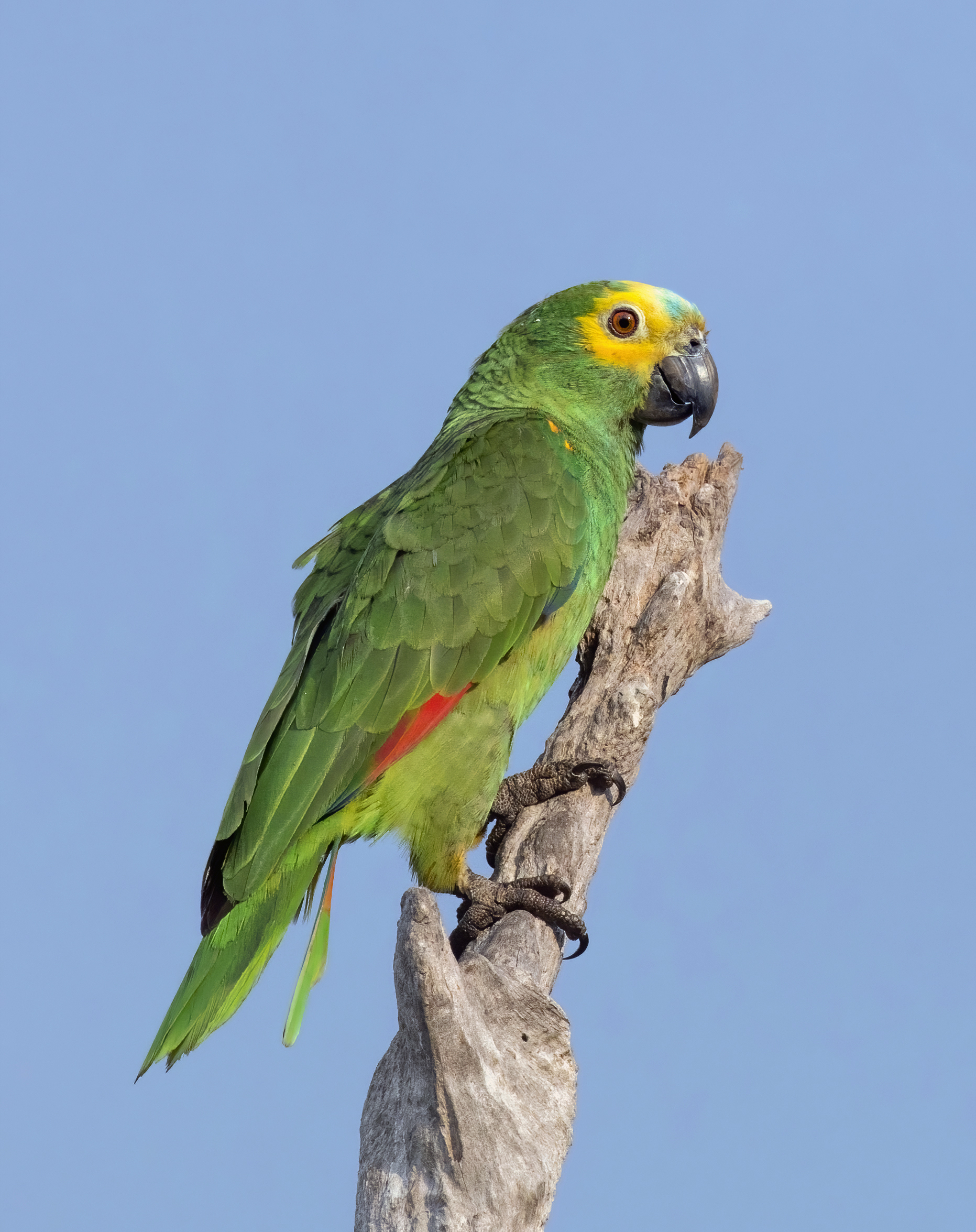
- Wild bird in the Pantanal, Brazil

Conservation status
- Near Threatened (IUCN 3.1)

Scientific classification
- Kingdom: Animalia
- Phylum: Chordata
- Class: Aves
- Order: Psittaciformes
- Family: Psittacidae
- Genus: Amazona
- Species: A. aestiva

Binomial name
- Amazona aestiva (Linnaeus, 1758)

Synonyms
- Psittacus aestivus Linnaeus, 1758

= Blue-fronted amazon =

Species of bird

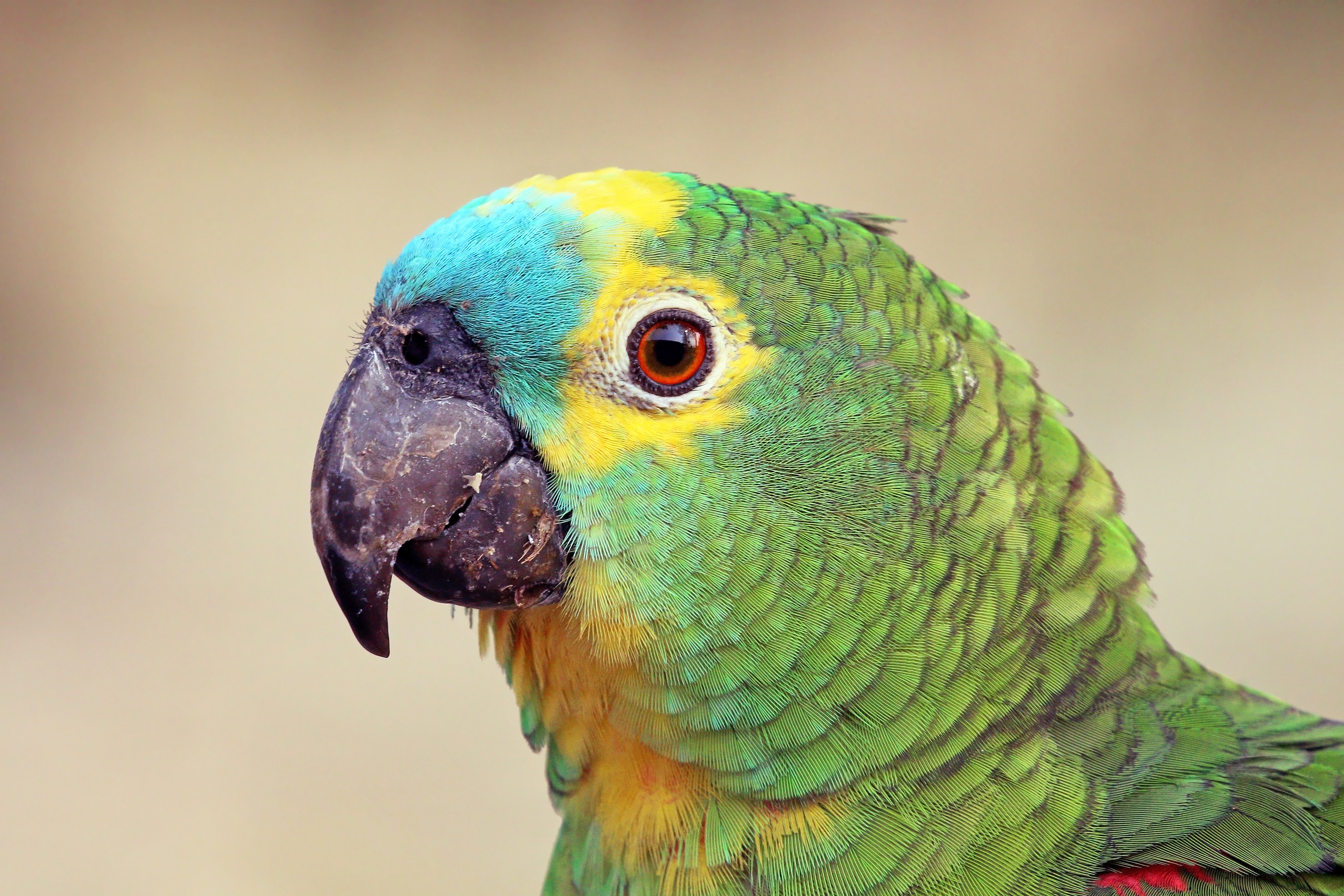
in the Pantanal, Brazil

The blue-fronted amazon (Amazona aestiva), also called the blue-fronted parrot, the turquoise-fronted amazon and the turquoise-fronted parrot, is a South American species of amazon parrot and one of the most common amazon parrots kept in captivity as a pet or companion parrot. Its common name is derived from the distinctive blue/turquoise marking on its head just above its beak.

== Taxonomy ==
The blue-fronted amazon was one of the many species originally described by Carl Linnaeus in his landmark 1758 10th edition of Systema Naturae. Its specific epithet is the feminine form of the Latin adjective aestivus, "of the summer". Two subspecies are recognized:

- A. a. aestiva (nominate) is found in eastern Brazil. The leading edge of the wing ("shoulder") is red.
- A. a. xanthopteryx occurs from northern and eastern Bolivia through adjacent parts of Brazil, to Paraguay and northern Argentina. The "shoulder" is partly or wholly yellow. Generally with more yellow to the head than nominate.

The taxon xanthopteryx has been treated as a separate species, but the two subspecies interbreed freely where they come into contact.

Additionally, there are significant individual variations in both facial pattern and amount of yellow/red to the "shoulder". In one extreme, individuals with essentially no yellow on the head and entirely green "shoulders" are known from north-western Argentina.

== Description ==
The blue-fronted amazon is a mainly green parrot about 38 cm (15 in) long. They have blue feathers on the forehead above the beak and yellow on the face and crown. Distribution of blue and yellow varies greatly among individuals. Unlike most other Amazona parrots, its beak is mostly black. There is no overt sexual dimorphism to the human eye, but analysis of the feathers using spectrometry, a method which allows the plumage to be seen as it would be by a parrot's tetrachromatic vision, shows clear differences between the plumage of the sexes. Juveniles of parrots are duller and have dark irises.

== Distribution and habitat ==
The range of the blue-fronted amazon extends over eastern and northern Bolivia, eastern Brazil, Paraguay and northern Argentina. It is found in forests (though generally avoids extensive humid forests such as the Amazon), woodland, savanna and palm groves.

A small feral breeding population is also present in the greener regions of Stuttgart in Germany and Genoa in Italy. Although they have been observed in the wild in Puerto Rico, they are probably the result of escaped pets, and no reproduction has been recorded.

== Breeding ==
The blue-fronted amazon nests in tree cavities. The oval eggs are white and measure around 38 × 30 mm. There are usually three to five in a clutch. The female incubates the eggs for about 27 days and the chicks leave the nest about 60 days after hatching.

== Status ==
The status of this species is evaluated as being of least concern by BirdLife International. However, while it remains common throughout a significant part of its range, there is evidence of a population decline, and this species has been heavily traded: Since 1981 when it was listed on CITES Appendix II, 413,505 wild-caught individuals have been recorded in international trade (UNEP-WCMC CITES Trade Database, January 2005). It is regarded as a crop pest in parts of its native range.

Paradoxically, illegal trade may have contributed to expansions of the range of this parrot: It is becoming common in Rio de Janeiro, which is not a part of its historical range, something attributed to escaped caged birds.

== Aviculture ==
The blue-fronted amazon is commonly seen as a pet, both in South America and other parts of the world. Their talking ability varies greatly from individual to individual, but some speak nearly as well as the yellow-headed amazon group (yellow-naped, Panama, yellow-crowned, double yellow-headed). They seem to have a proclivity for singing. They require interaction but also can play with toys contently for several hours at a time. Pets require plenty of toys, perches, and climbing room. As with some other birds, under no circumstances are blue-fronted amazons to eat avocado. Some individuals, particularly males, can be aggressive in spring, the mating season.

An extremely rare red (or chocolate raspberry) mutation of the species appeared in captivity in 2004, bred by the psittaculturist Howard Voren. The mutation results in yellow plumage being replaced by that of a red/pink hue and greens with a chocolate-brown, with the depth and intensity of color varying by location upon the body.

== Gallery ==
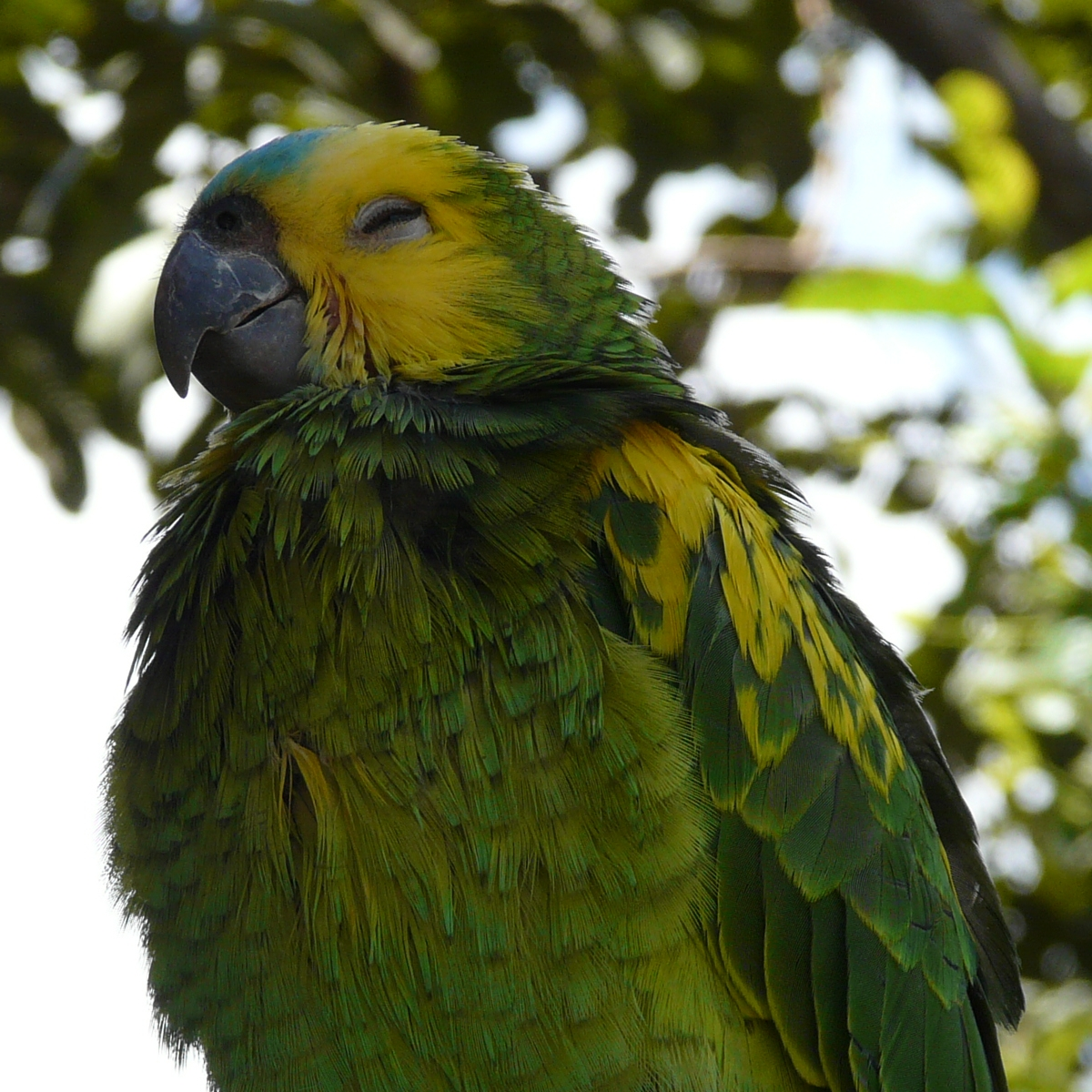
A. a. xanthopteryx

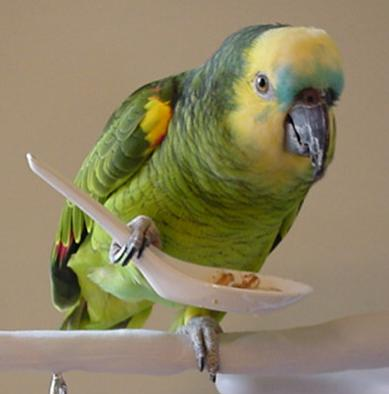
Pet blue-fronted amazon eats from a spoon

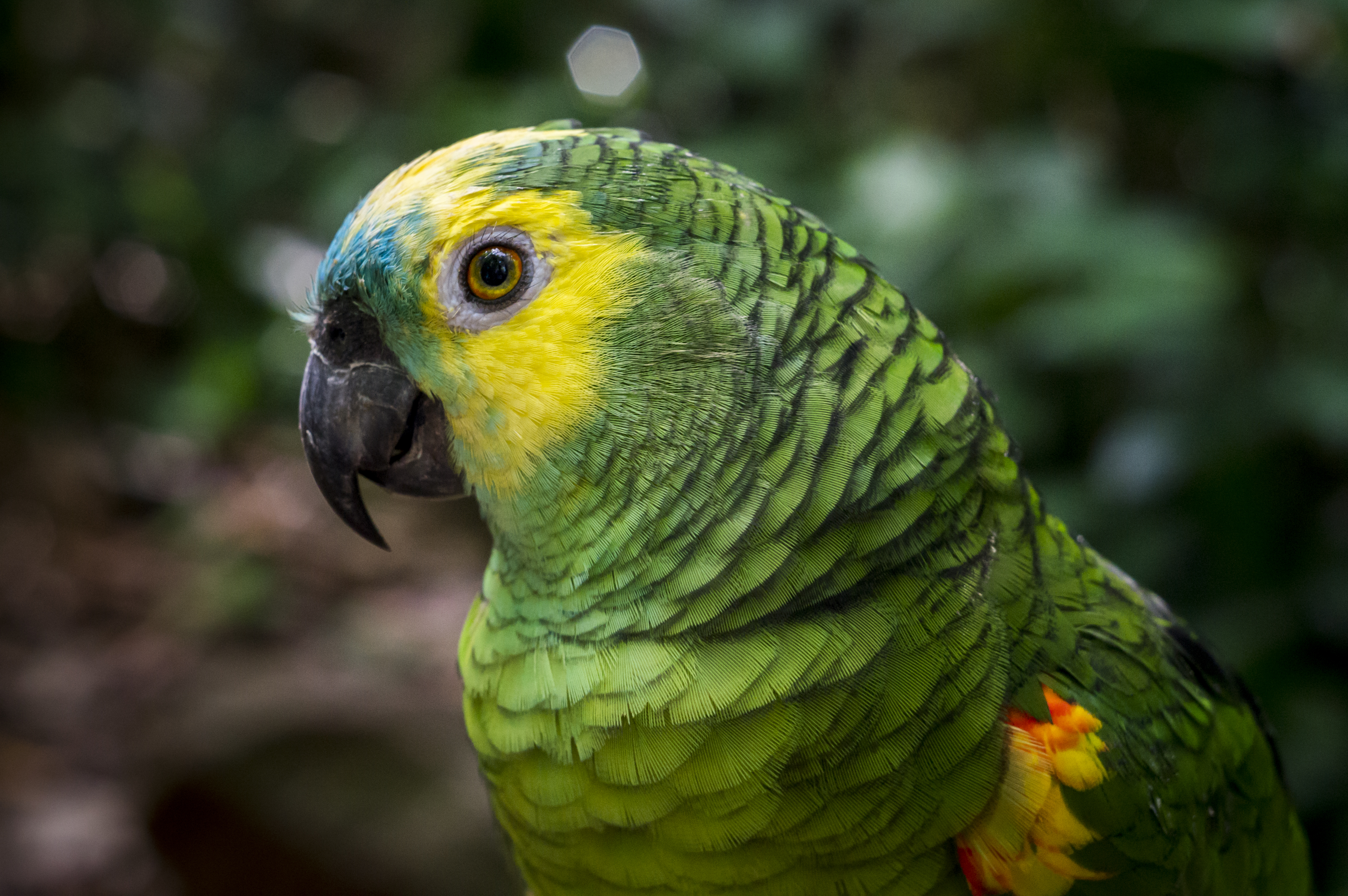
At Parque das Aves, Brazil

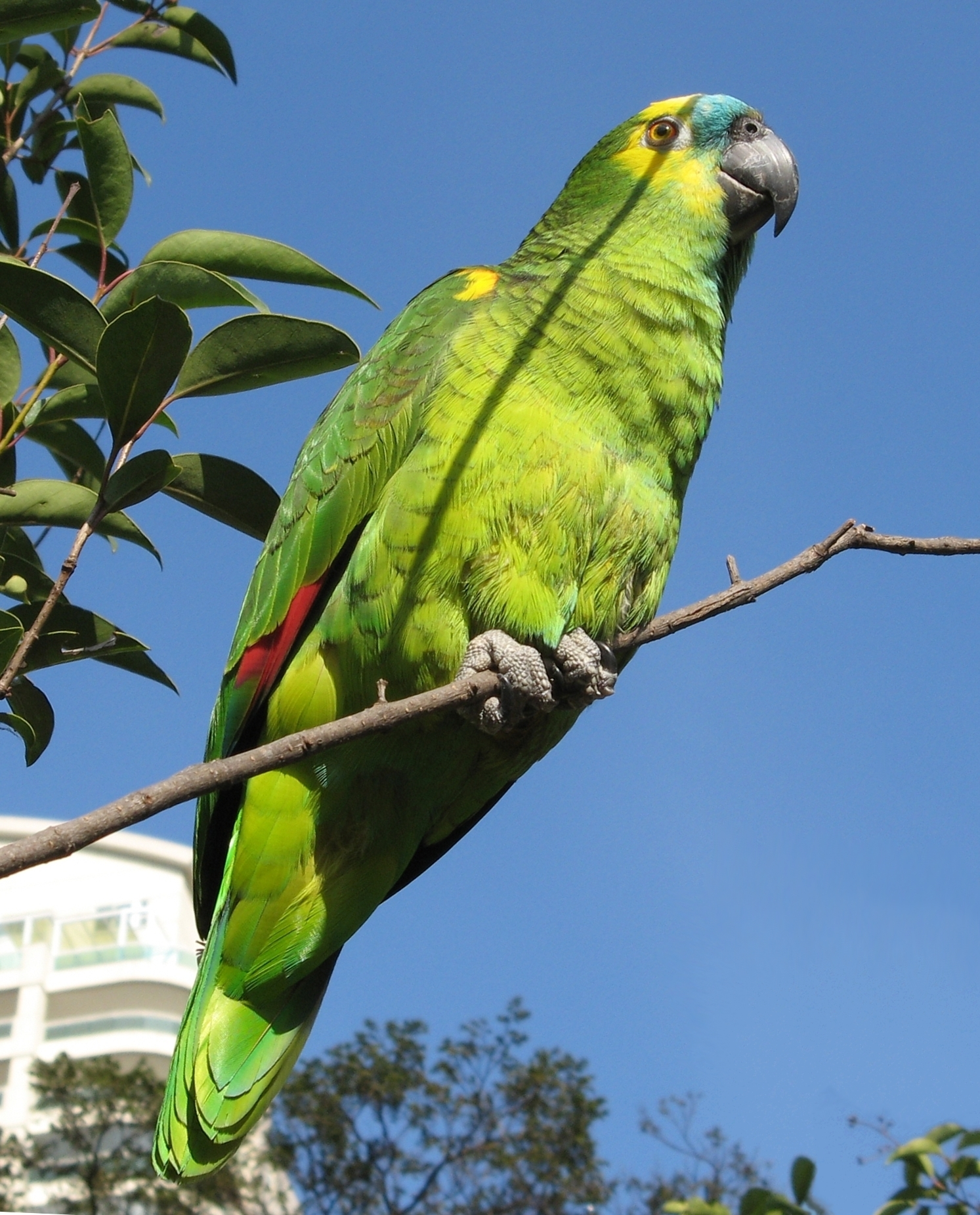
From the feral population in São Paulo, Brazil

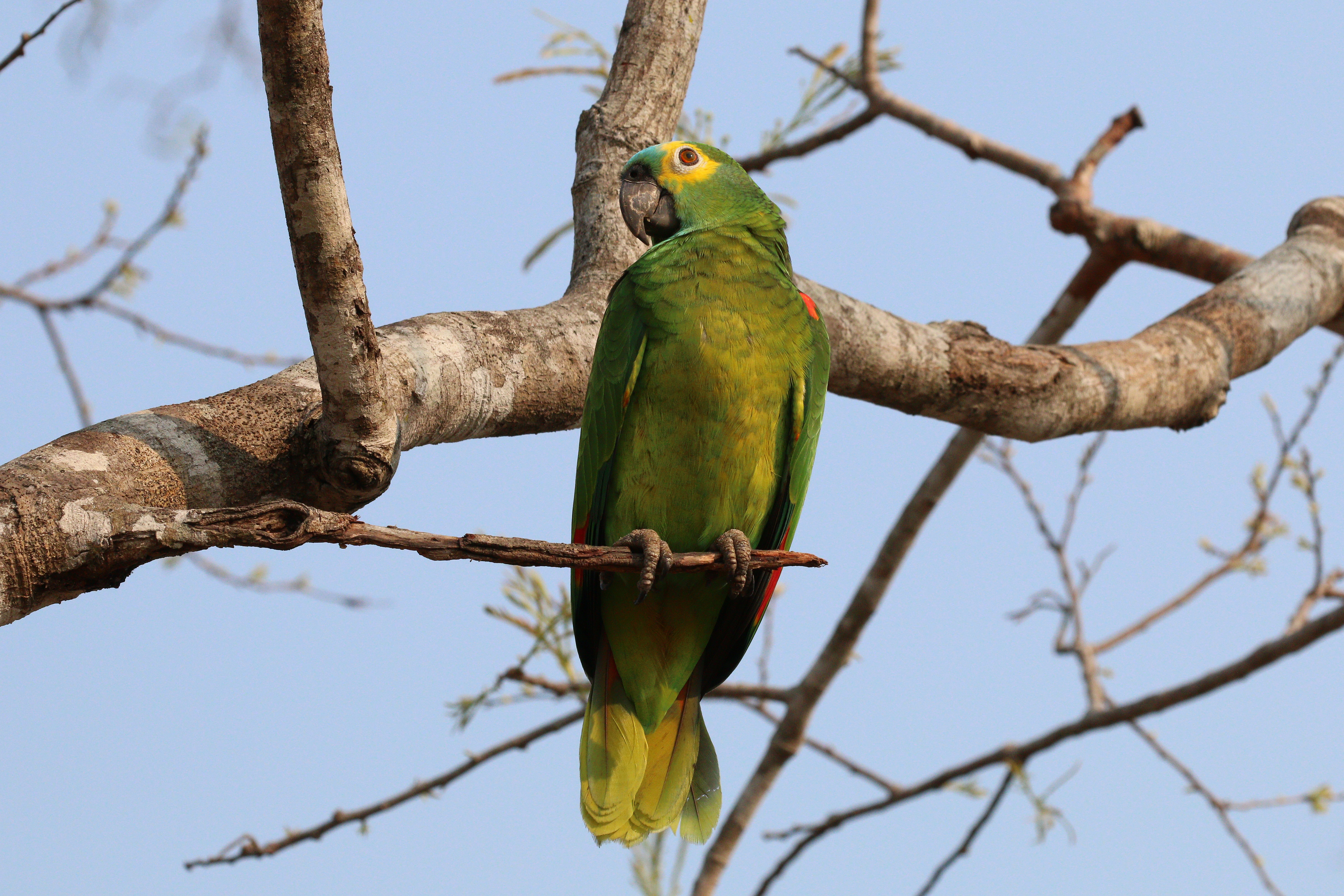
Wild bird
in the Pantanal, Brazil

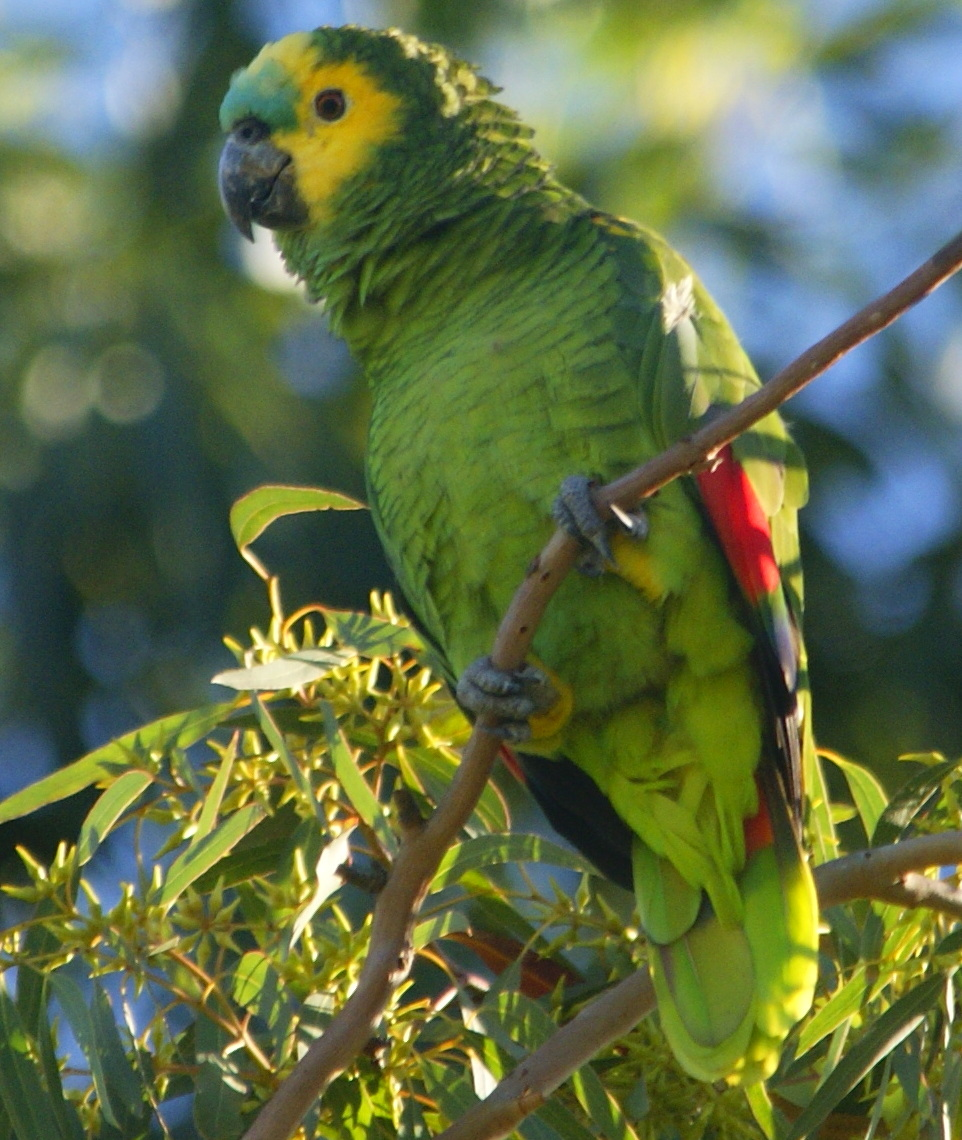

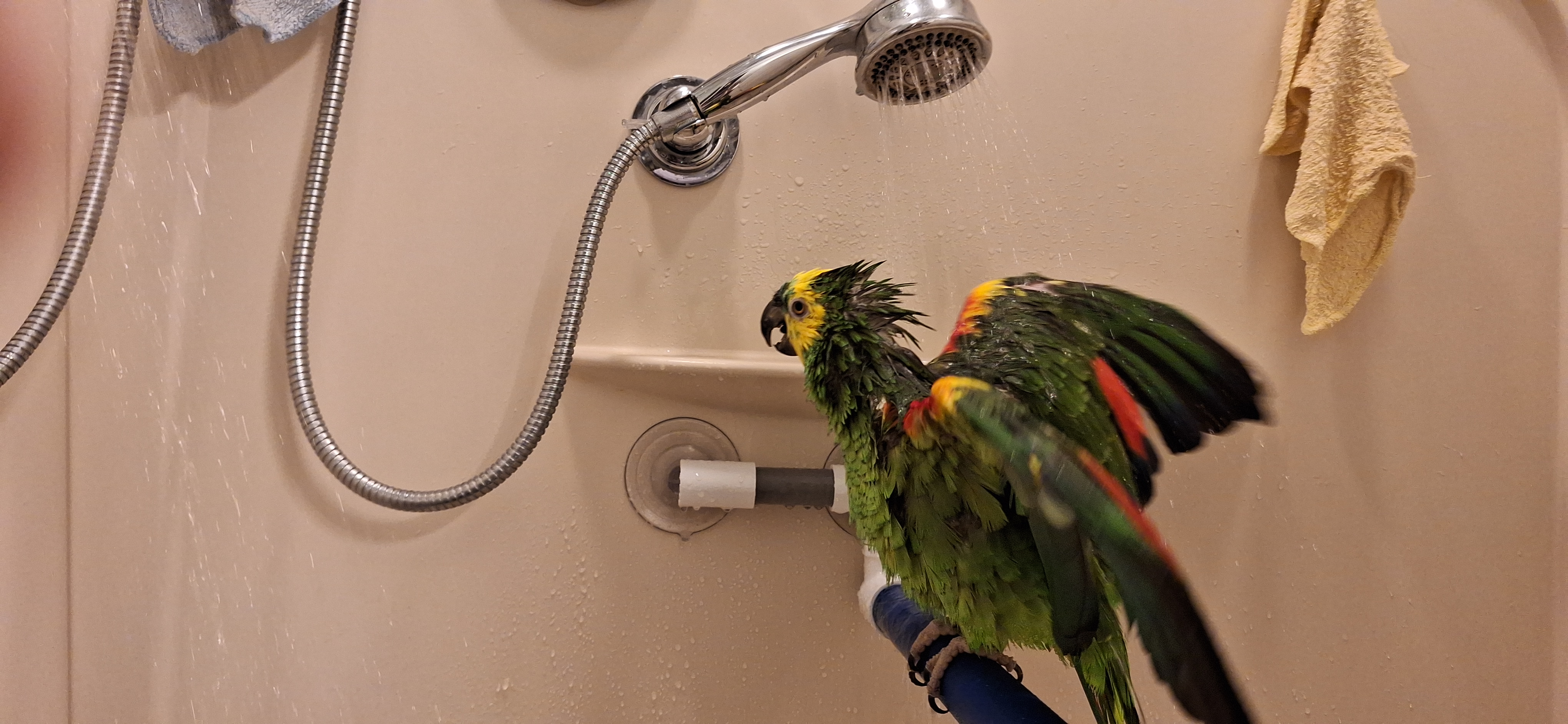
Pet blue fronted amazon inside the shower

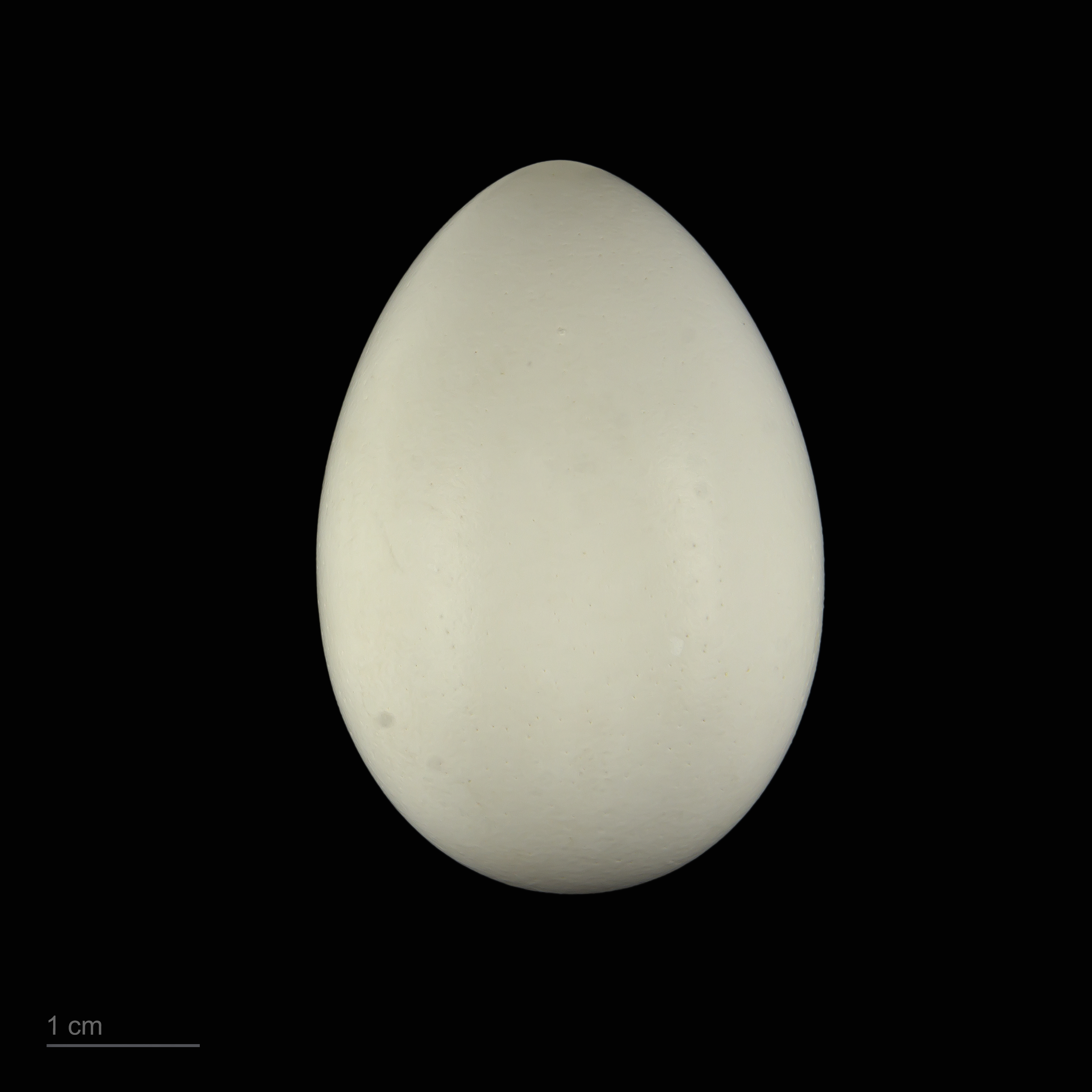
Amazona aestiva - MHNT

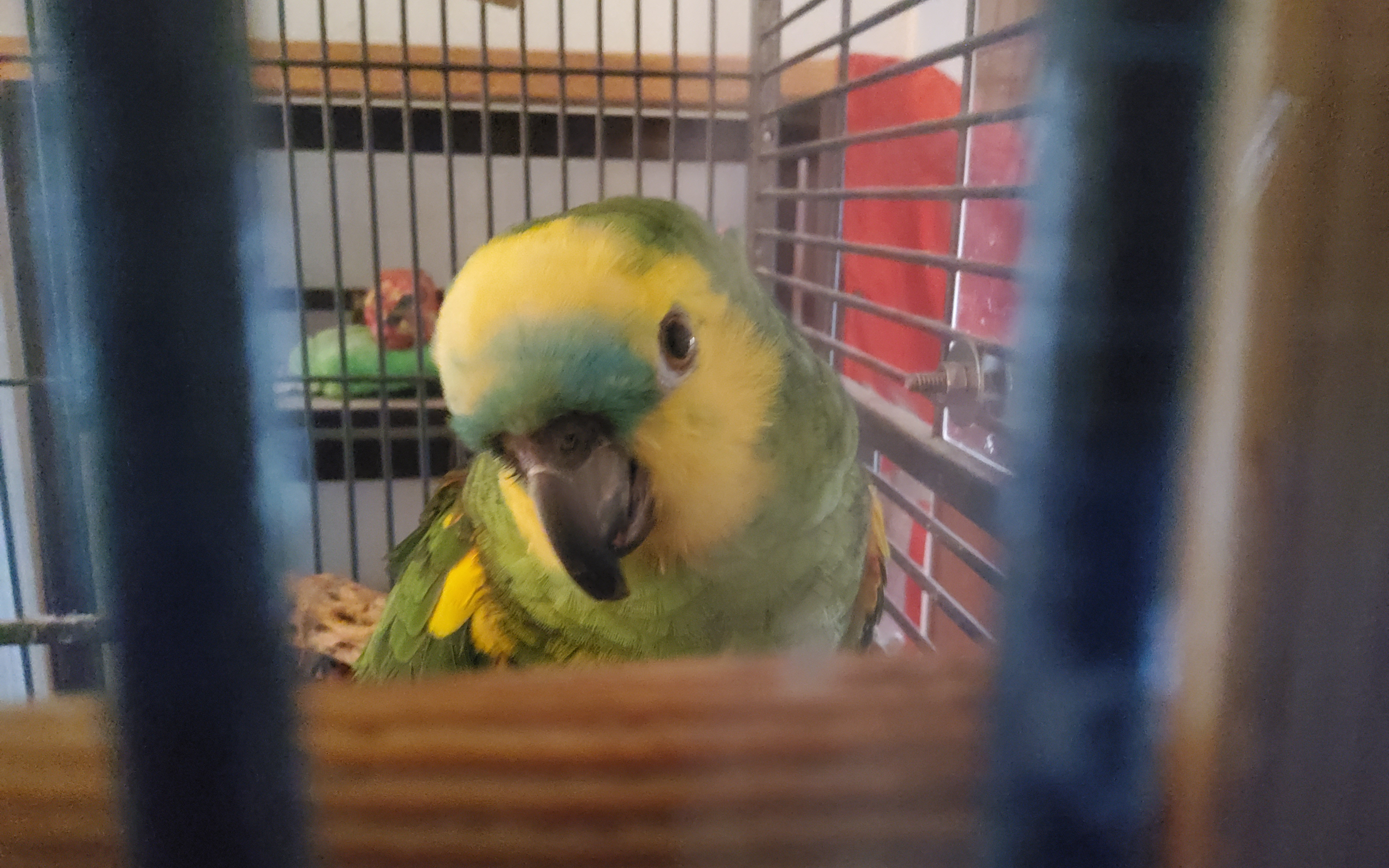
A pet blue fronted amazon in her cage
