= Eye pinning =

Body language in parrots and related birds

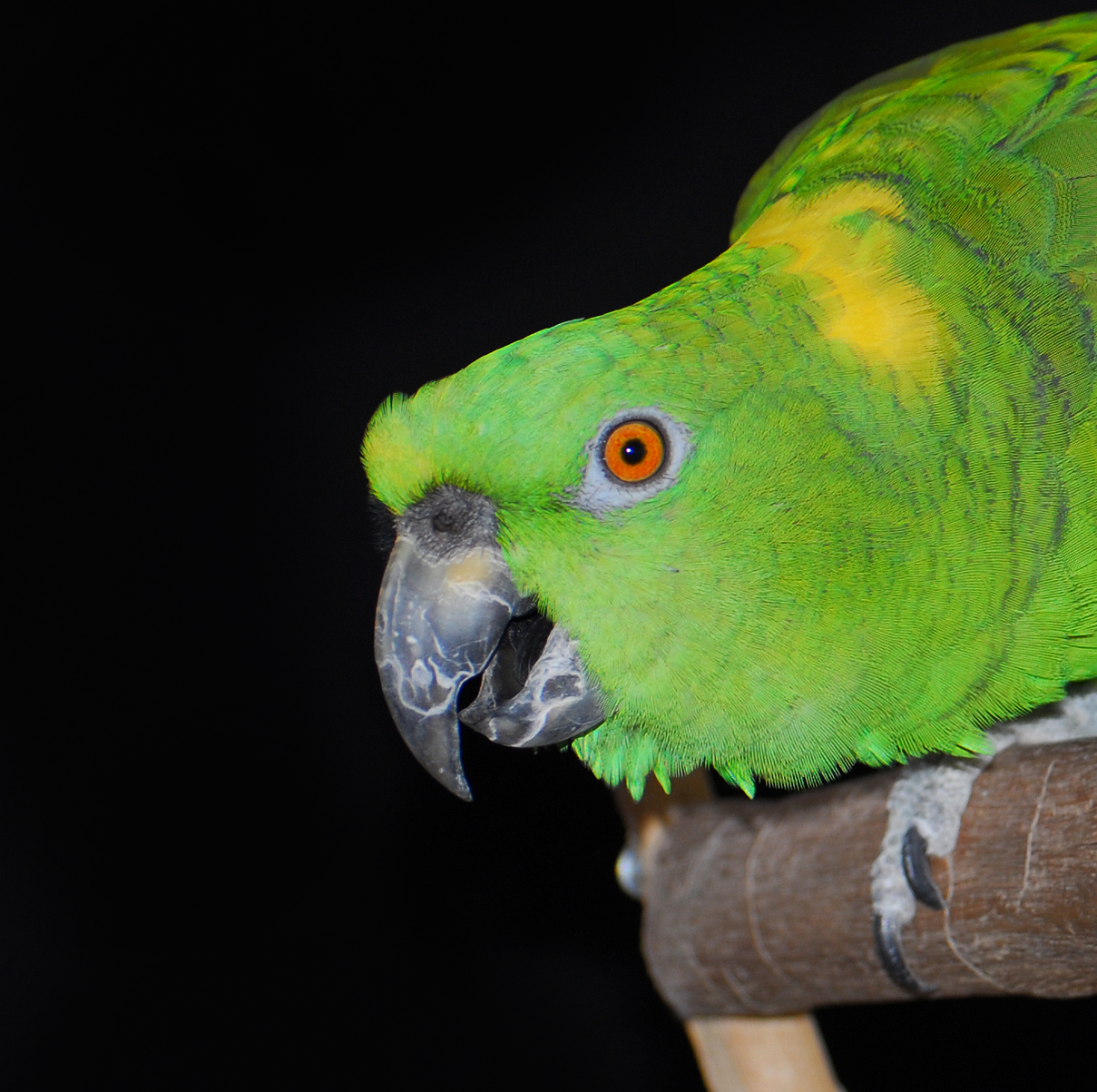
Yellow-naped amazon parrot eye pinning.

Eye pinning, also known as eye flashing or eye blazing, is a form of body language used by parrots. The term that refers to the rapid and very conspicuous dilation and constriction of the pupils of the bird's eyes in response to an external stimulus. Unlike humans, parrots are able to control this reflex and use it as a form of nonverbal communication. It is a common behavior in amazons, macaws, Poicephalus species and the African grey parrots.

It can be an indication that the parrot is feeling excited, angry, afraid or is interested in something. In some circumstances, it may also be a warning that the parrot is currently in a state of being where it will bite if touched. Male budgerigars will perform eye pinning as part of their courtship behavior, pinning the eyes while singing, fluffing and head bobbing, while amazon parrots may pin their eyes to show excitement during play, alongside a fanned tail and raised head and neck feathers.

In the Panama amazon, eye pinning has been noted during vocal communication with humans. The parrot's eyes were observed to noticeably contract when talking or mimicking other sounds of human origin, video recordings indicating that the pupils began contracting several milliseconds prior to the utterance, perhaps suggesting some sort of 'internal rehearsal' process. This was not seen to be the case in the experiment with innate parrot sounds such as short squawks, neither was this behavior observed in a non-talking blue-fronted amazon. In certain circumstances, eye pinning would also occur when the bird heard specific favored words or sounds from humans.

This behavior has also been observed in domestic chickens and woodpigeons.
