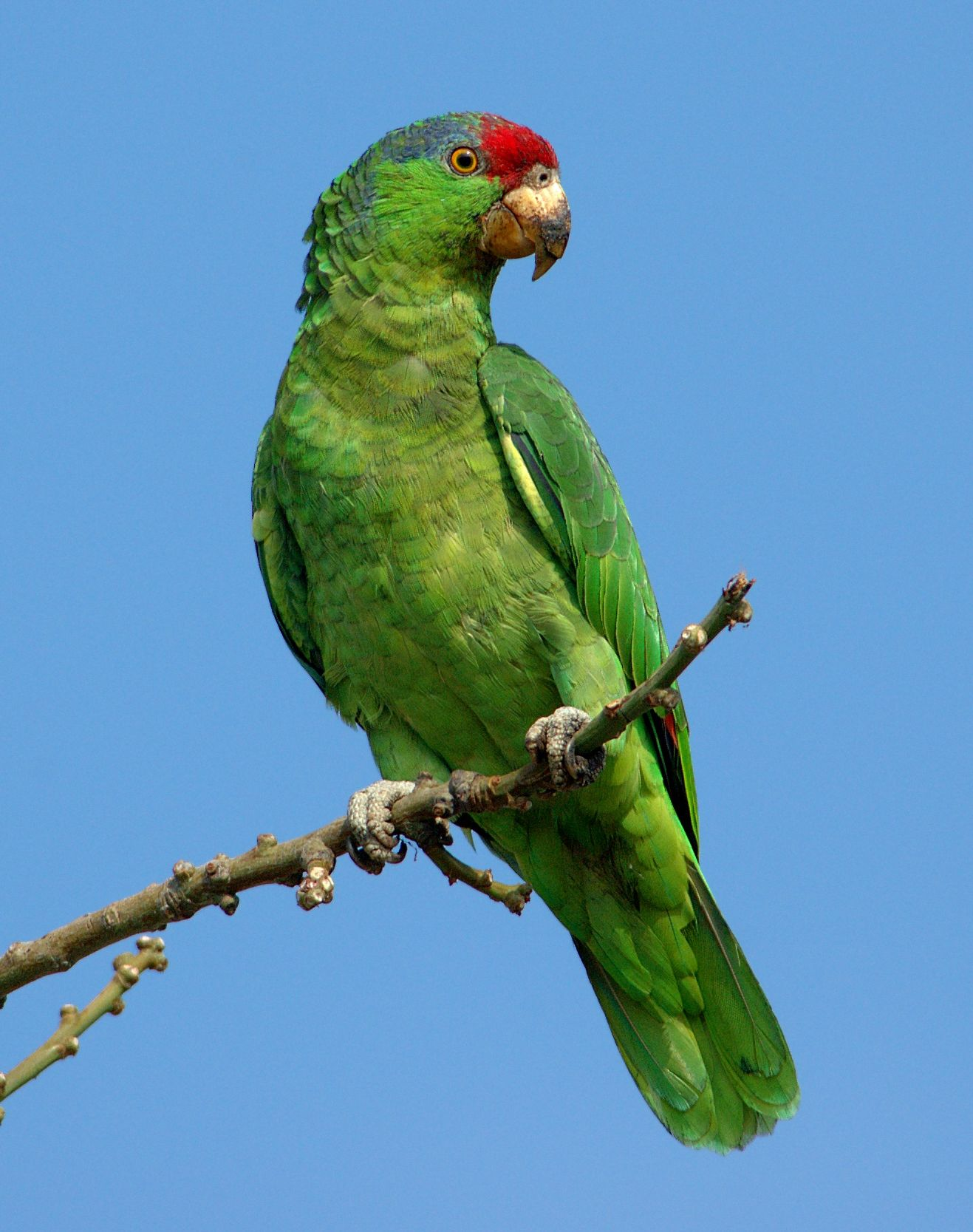

Conservation status
- Endangered (IUCN 3.1)
- CITES Appendix I

Scientific classification
- Kingdom: Animalia
- Phylum: Chordata
- Class: Aves
- Order: Psittaciformes
- Family: Psittacidae
- Genus: Amazona
- Species: A. viridigenalis

Binomial name
- Amazona viridigenalis (Cassin, 1853)

= Red-crowned amazon =

Species of North American parrot

The red-crowned amazon (Amazona viridigenalis), also known as the red-crowned parrot, green-cheeked amazon or Mexican red-headed parrot, is an endangered amazon parrot native to northeastern Mexico and possibly southern Texas in the United States. A 1994 study estimated wild populations of between 2,000 and 4,300 mature individuals; the IUCN Red List considers it a globally endangered species with a decreasing population. The main threats to the native bird's survival are the illegal export of trapped birds from Mexico to the United States for the pet trade and the destruction of their natural habitat, the lowland forests of northeastern Mexico.

== Description ==
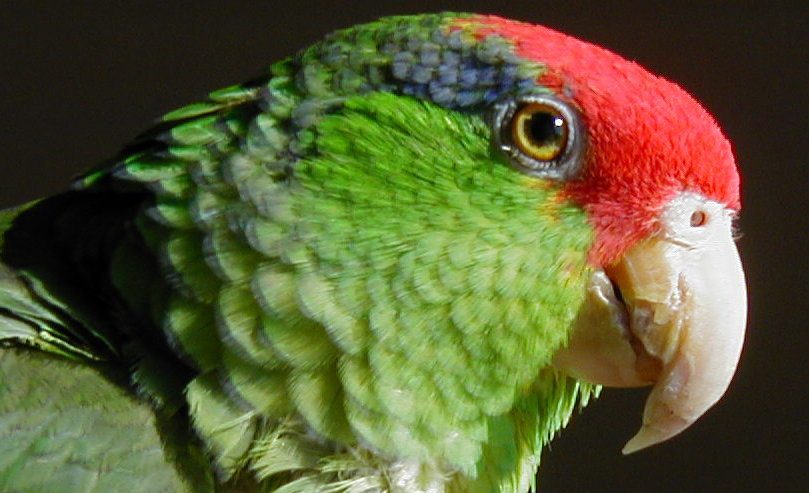
Head and neck

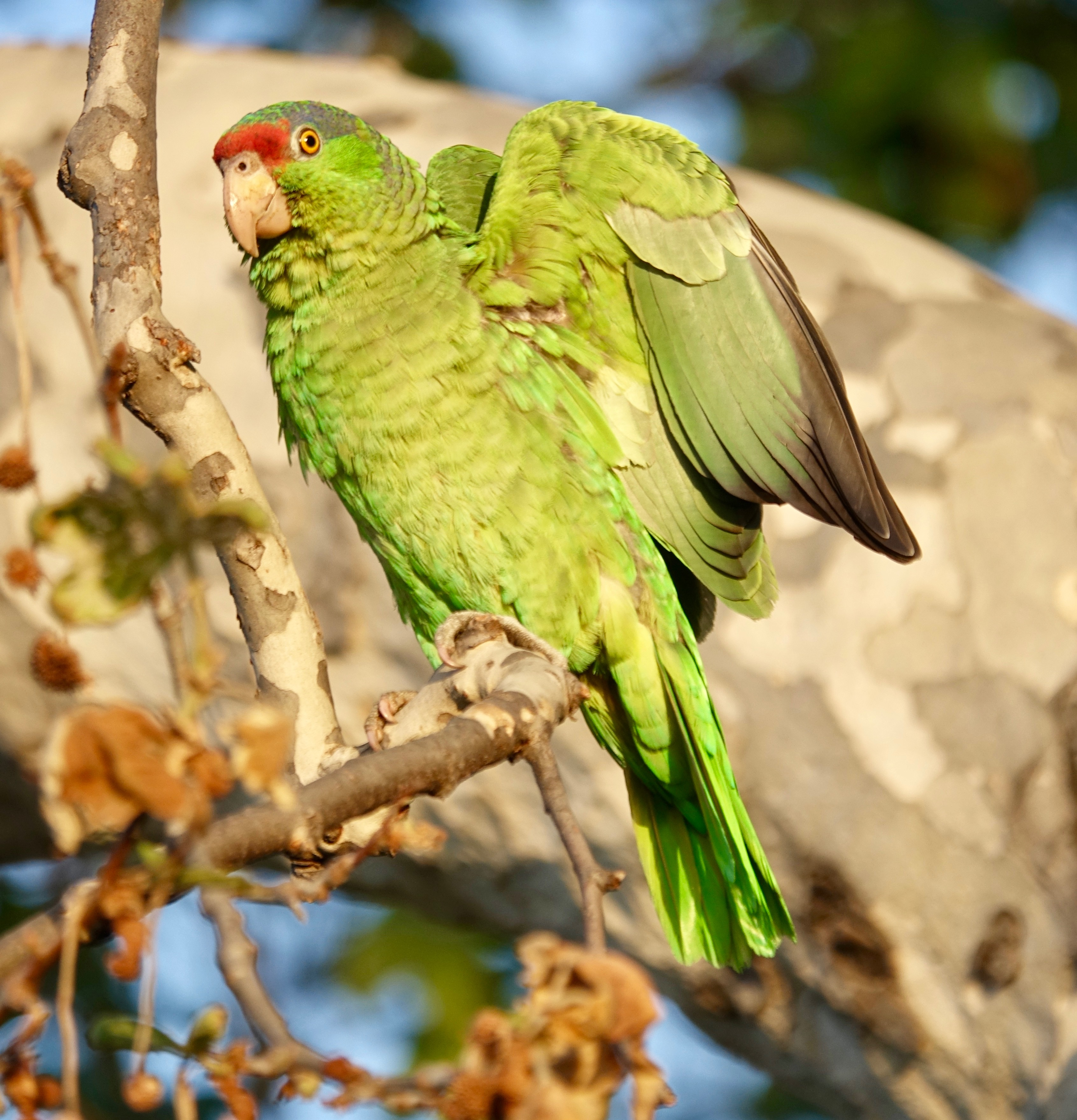
With wings partly unfurled

Their appearance is generally green with the most notable features being a bright red forehead and crown, dark blue streak behind the eyes, and light green cheeks. It is not uncommon for red-crowned amazons to have splashes of red and blue under their wings and have light yellow-tipped tails. They have a white eye-ring which brings out their eyes. Their iris color can range from a bright yellow to a deep red, although juveniles' eyes are gray until maturity. Red-crowned amazons usually have horn colored beaks and ceres but these can sometimes have black highlights. Their legs are beige or gray. They are approximately 11–13 inches (28–33 cm) in length from the beak to the tip of the tail feathers with a wingspan of 15–16 inches (38–41 cm). Most Amazon parrots are not sexually dimorphic (the exceptions being the White-fronted Amazona albifrons, Yellow-lored Amazona xantholora, and Blue-fronted Amazona aestiva) so the only true way to identify sex is by genetic testing. Their average weight is 270 grams (9.5 oz).

== Range ==
Their natural range is across the lowlands of northeastern Mexico, and possibly the southern tip of Texas. Red-crowned amazons are a resident (non-migratory) species in their native range, but they can wander outside of their breeding range to follow a food source. Feral birds have bred in urban communities of southern California, southern Florida and the island of Oahu in Hawaii. There is also a population in the municipality of Salinas, Puerto Rico, particularly in and around the Central Aguirre and Jobos Bay areas. The current distribution of Red-crowned Parrots in the US is estimated at 18,965 km^2, 11,890 km^2 in California, 3,573 km^2 in Texas, and 3,502 km^2 in Florida (Oahu in Hawaii has not been researched or predicted).

On June 4, 2019, the Corpus Christi Ecological Services Field Office of the US Fish & Wildlife Service announced to the public that the USFWS considers the red-crowned parrot native to Texas in the Rio Grande Valley. However, because parrots were not mentioned in the Migratory Bird Treaty Act of 1918, birds in the Texas portion of their range are not entitled to USFWS protection, and must rely on enacted state and local laws. The USFWS estimated that there are roughly 700 wild red-crowned parrots in the Rio Grande Valley of Texas in 2019, and historical records place parrots in South Texas as early as 1885. The numbers of wild parrots in the United States now rivals populations in Mexico, due to their adaptation to urban life. However, the IUCN and other resources consider the bird to be non-native to all parts of the United States, including southern Texas. NatureServe considers the species to be "Imperiled" in Texas.

=== Feral parrots ===
Populations of feral parrots exist in cities throughout California, especially in areas such as the Los Angeles metropolitan area and the San Gabriel Valley as well as in San Diego area.These populations began forming around the 1960s when pet parrots escaped and/or were released into the environment. Over time, the birds adapted and became part of the urban ecosystem. According to Presence of Endangered Red-Crowned Parrots Depends on Urban Landscapes, approximately 92% of recorded sightings in California occurred in urban areas. The California Parrot Project says that red-crowned amazons are among the thirteen species of parrots with naturalized populations in California, including six in the genus Amazona. Although originated from Northeastern Mexico and Southern Texas, the native population has since declined because of habitat destruction and the capture pet trade. Interestingly, Los Angeles has been called a sanctuary for these endangered species, with one study suggesting it supports a population of around 3,700 individuals. Along with Southern California’s relatively warm climate and dry watering gardens and trees, the parrots are able to thrive in this type of environment. Although their loud calls can annoy residents, these parrots have become a recognizable part of local identity and pride among community members

== Behavior ==
They gather in large flocks being noisiest in the morning and evening. The characteristic screeching heard of these birds usually occurs when they travel in a large flock to a new feeding area. Their diet consists of seeds, fruits, flowers and nectar. Red-crowned amazons nest in tree cavities, like most other parrots. Amazons are one of the easiest parrots to read the behavior of, as their eye color shows their pinning exceptionally well. Red-crowned amazons pin their eyes when they are excited, either positively or negatively, about something in their environment. It is easy to make out the dilations of the pupil against the bright iris. This pinning, combined with different behavioral signs, can let a fellow parrot or an owner know how the parrot is feeling. An angry parrot may fan its tail feathers while a content, affectionate parrot may purr, or bend their head down to be scratched.

== Reproduction ==
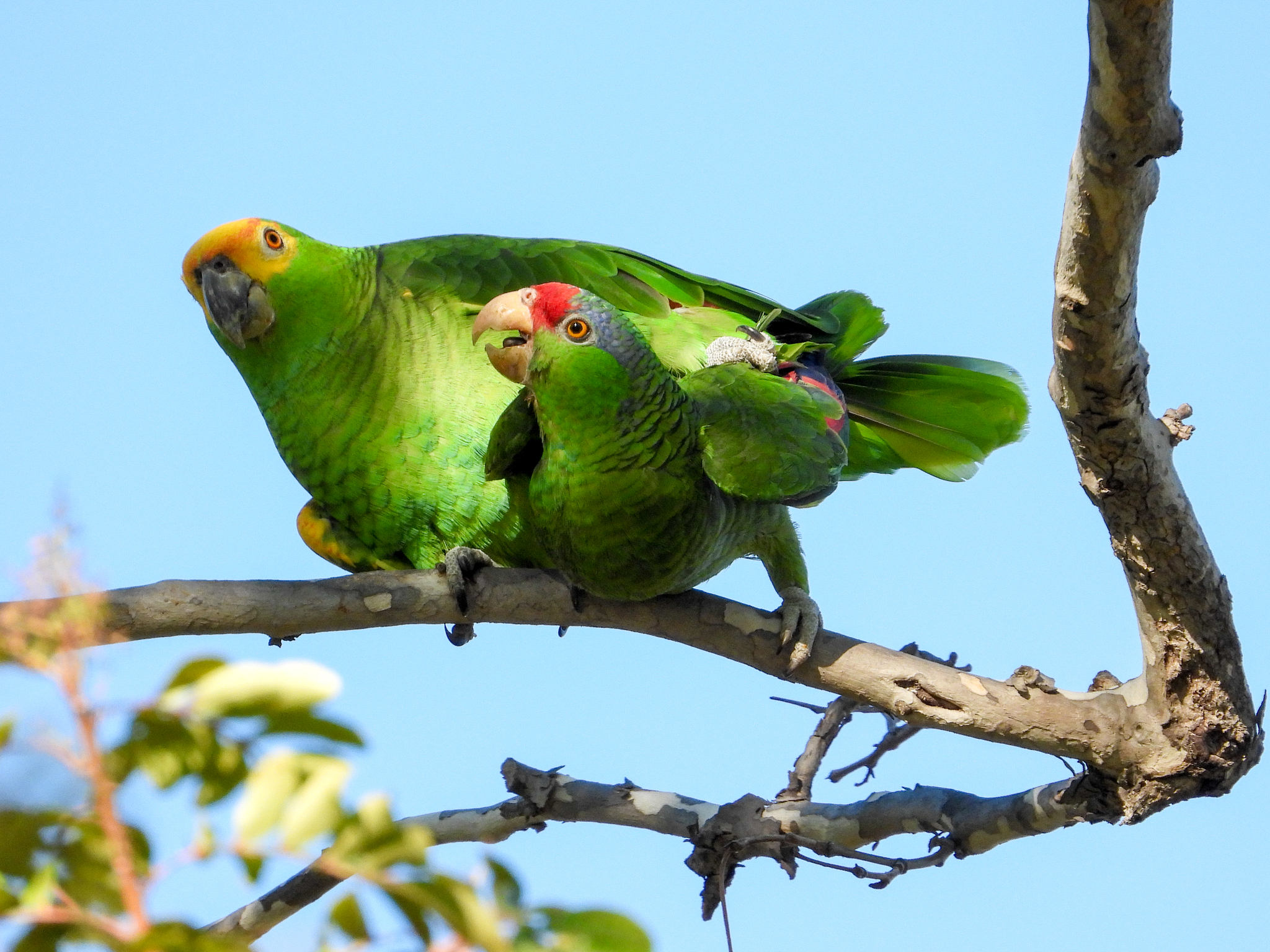
Mating with a yellow-headed amazon, in California

Red-crowned amazon parrots reach sexual maturity at about five years old. It takes the female approximately 28 days to incubate her eggs, at an average of four eggs per clutch. Fledging begins at nine weeks old. In the wild, these parrots mate for life and find tree cavities near other members of their flock, creating a breeding group known as a colony. They will return to the same cavity every year to raise chicks unless that cavity was previously poached or they did not have reproductive success there for a different reason.

== Aviculture ==
These parrots are often kept as pets and can be very affectionate and playful when given the attention they need from their owners. Although some are excellent talkers and copy voices, they are best at mimicking sounds that stand out to them, such as the microwave, telephone or other pets. Many owners report a streak of mischief due to their heightened curiosity. Red-crowned amazons can live 50+ years in captivity, with some extending over 70 years old if properly cared for.

Common challenges associated with owning this type of parrot includes being able to provide enough exercise for it and convincing it to eat a varied, healthy diet, close to the diet it would have in the wild. Amazons are known for becoming sedentary if not provided enough stimuli, and this can lead to health issues, such as obesity. These birds are not regarded as overly sensitive and are actually one of the hardier large species to own as a pet because common stressors for other companion parrot species are coped with better and neurotic behaviors due to stress or depression, such as feather plucking, are infrequent when compared to other species. Another challenge some owners face is the hormonal bluffing during the breeding season (spring) for adolescents that causes some parrots, especially males, to be more prone to nipping their owners, biting anyone who is not their favorite person and screaming. These hormonal outbursts decrease with age.
