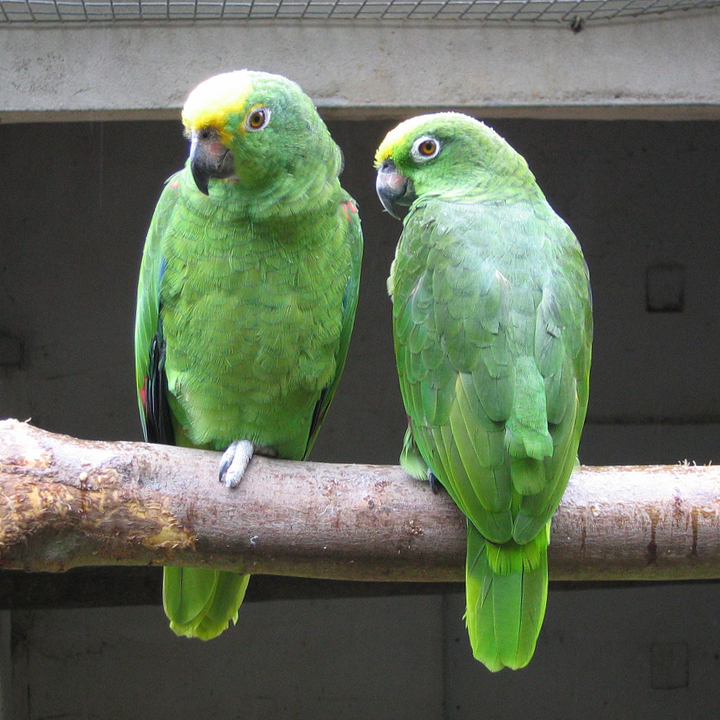
- At Well Place Zoo, England

Conservation status
- Least Concern (IUCN 3.1)

Scientific classification
- Kingdom: Animalia
- Phylum: Chordata
- Class: Aves
- Order: Psittaciformes
- Family: Psittacidae
- Genus: Amazona
- Species: A. ochrocephala

Binomial name
- Amazona ochrocephala (Gmelin, 1788)

= Yellow-crowned amazon =

Species of bird

The yellow-crowned amazon or yellow-crowned parrot (Amazona ochrocephala) is a species of parrot native to tropical South America, Panama and Trinidad and Tobago in the Caribbean. The taxonomy is highly complex and the yellow-headed (A. oratrix) and yellow-naped amazon (A. auropalliata) are sometimes considered subspecies of the yellow-crowned amazon. Except in the taxonomic section, the following deals only with the nominate group (including subspecies xantholaema, nattereri and panamensis).They are found in the Amazon basin.

== Taxonomy ==
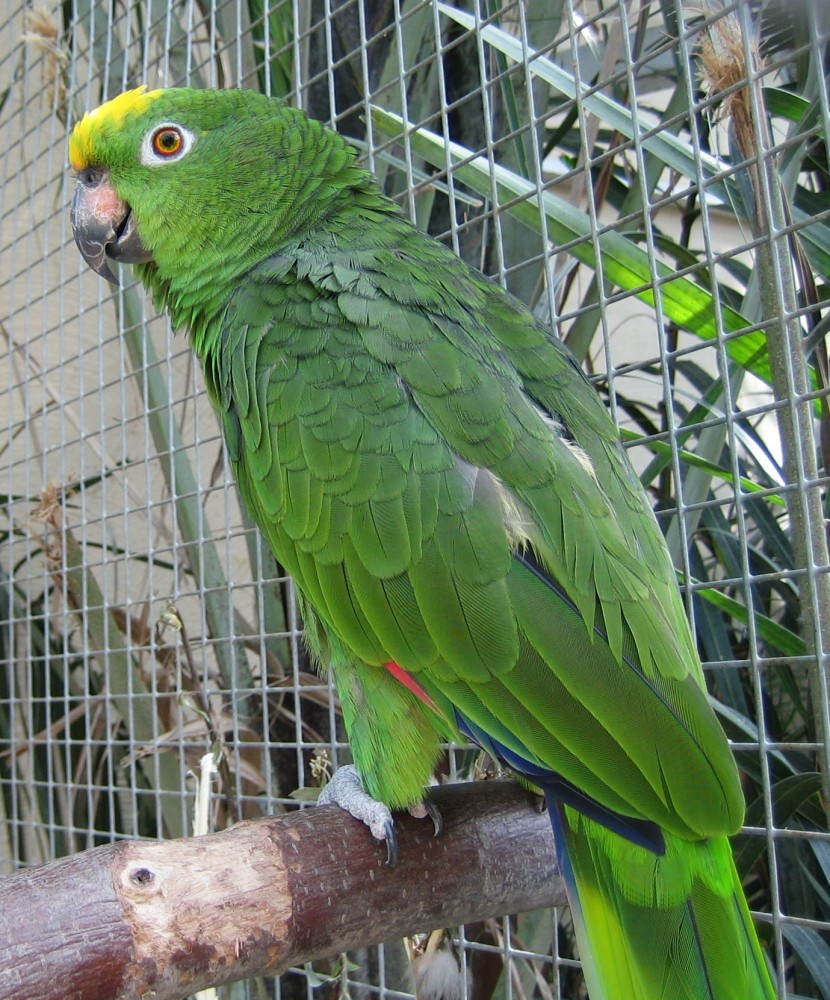
A. o. ochrocephala

The yellow-crowned amazon was formally described in 1788 by the German naturalist Johann Friedrich Gmelin in his revised and expanded edition of Carl Linnaeus's Systema Naturae. He placed it with all the other parrots in the genus Psittacus and coined the binomial name Psittacus ochrocephalus. Gmelin specified the type locality as "America", but this was restricted to Venezuela in 1902. The yellow-crowned amazon is now one of around thirty species of parrot placed in the genus Amazona that was introduced by the French naturalist René Lesson in 1830. The genus name is a Latinized version of the name Amazone given to these parrot in the 18th century by the Comte de Buffon, who believed they were native to Amazonian jungles. The specific ochrocephala combines the Ancient Greek ōkhros meaning "pale yellow" with -kephalos meaning "-headed".

Four subspecies are recognised:

- A. o. panamensis (Cabanis, 1874) – west Panama and northwest Colombia
- A. o. ochrocephala (Gmelin, JF, 1788) – east Colombia and Venezuela through the Guianas and north Brazil
- A. o. xantholaema Berlepsch, 1913 – island of Marajó (off north Brazil in the Amazon delta)
- A. o. nattereri (Finsch, 1865) – south Colombia to east Peru, north Bolivia and west Brazil

The Amazona ochrocephala complex, which has been described as "a taxonomic headache", is considered a single species by some authorities and split into three species, A. ochrocephala (yellow-crowned amazon), A. auropalliata (yellow-naped amazon) and A. oratrix (yellow-headed amazon), by others. The split is mainly based on the amount of yellow in the plumage, the color of the legs and bill, the close proximity of the oratrix group and auropalliata group in Oaxaca, Mexico, without apparent interbreeding and the presence of members of both the nominate group and the auropalliata group in northern Honduras. This evaluation has, however, been confused by misunderstandings regarding the plumage variations in the populations in northern Honduras, where birds vary greatly in amount of yellow on the head, crown and nape, but have pale bills and a juvenile plumage matching the oratrix group, but neither the nominate nor the auropalliata group. The taxon caribaea from the Bay Islands is a member of the auropalliata group, and occurs in relatively close proximity to the members of the oratrix group. As caribaea may have a relatively pale lower mandible, this could indicating a level of gene flow between this and the nearby taxa of the oratrix group. If confirmed, this could suggest that the two are better considered conspecific. Alternatively, it has been suggested that caribaea and parvipes, both typically placed in the auropalliata group, may be closer to the oratrix than they are to the auropalliata sensu stricto. Both are relatively small and have red to the shoulder as in the members of the oratrix group, but unlike auropalliata sensu stricto.

The members of this complex are known to hybridize in captivity and recent phylogenetic analysis of DNA did not support the split into the three "traditional" biological species, but did reveal three clades, which potentially could be split into three phylogenetic species: a Mexican and Central American species (incl. panamensis, which extends slightly into South America), a species of northern South America (northern nominate), and a species from the southern Amazon basin (nattereri, xantholaema and southern nominate). The Central American clade can potentially be split further, with panamensis and tresmariae recognized as two monotypic species. The members of the clade from the southern Amazon basin should arguably be included as subspecies of the blue-fronted amazon, as they are closer to each other than to the northern clades. Disregarding these problems, the following taxa are part of the Amazona ochrocephala complex as traditionally delimited:

- nominate group ("true" yellow-crowned amazon):
  - Amazona o. ochrocephala: East-central and southeastern Colombia, Venezuela, Trinidad, Guyana, Suriname, French Guiana and the northern and eastern Amazon basin in Brazil.
  - Amazona o. xantholaema: Marajó Island, in the Amazon River delta of northeastern Brazil.
  - Amazona o. nattereri: Far southeastern Colombia, eastern Ecuador, eastern Peru, northern Bolivia and the southwestern Amazon basin of Brazil (east to around Mato Grosso); often included in A. o. ochrocephala.
  - Amazona o. panamensis: Western Panama to northwestern Colombia; sometimes called the Panama amazon
- auropalliata group (yellow-naped amazon):
  - Amazona a./o. auropalliata: Southern Mexico to northwestern Costa Rica.
  - Amazona a./o. parvipes: The Mosquito Coast in eastern Honduras and northeastern Nicaragua.
  - Amazona a./o. caribaea: The Bay Islands, Honduras.
- oratrix group (yellow-headed amazon):
  - Amazona o./o. oratrix: The Pacific and Gulf slopes of Mexico; also, a population in Stuttgart exists.
  - Amazona o./o. tresmariae: The Tres Marías Islands, off west-central Mexico.
  - Amazona o./o. belizensis: Belize.
  - Amazona o./o. hondurensis: The Sula Valley in northern Honduras.

Of these, hondurensis was only recently described, while the population in northwestern Honduras and adjacent eastern Guatemala (near Puerto Barrios) resembles belizensis and is commonly included in that subspecies, but may actually represent an undescribed subspecies. It has sometimes been referred to as guatemalensis, but until it is officially described, the name remains provisional. An additional subspecies, magna, has sometimes been recognized for the population on the Gulf slope of Mexico, but today most authorities consider it invalid, instead including this population in oratrix.

== Description ==
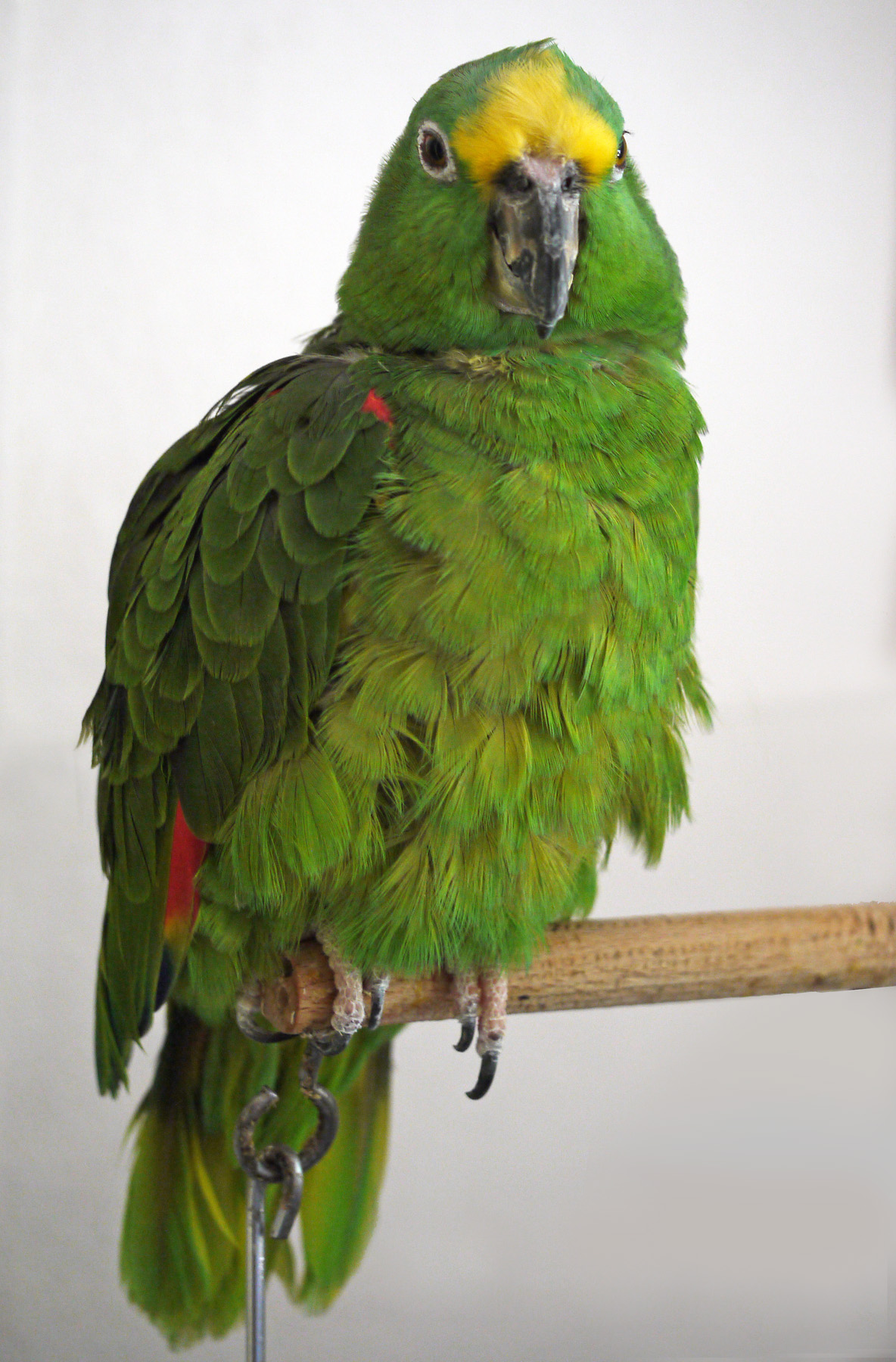
Pet parrot

Subspecies in the nominate group (including subspecies xantholaema, nattereri and panamensis) have a total length of 33–38 cm (14–15 in). As most other amazon parrots, it has a short squarish tail and primarily green plumage. It has dark blue tips to the secondaries and primaries and a red wing speculum, carpal edge (leading edge of the wing at the "shoulder") and base of the outer tail feathers. The red and dark blue sections are often difficult to see when the bird is perched, while the red base of the outer tail feathers only infrequently can be seen under normal viewing conditions in the wild. The amount of yellow to the head varies, with the nominate, nattereri and panamensis having yellow restricted to the crown-region (occasionally with a few random feathers around the eyes), while the subspecies xantholaema has most of the head yellow. All have a white eye-ring. They have a dark bill with a large horn (gray) or reddish spot on the upper mandible, except panamensis, which has a horn-colored beak. Males and females do not differ in plumage. Except for the wing speculum, juveniles have little yellow and red to the plumage.

== Distribution and habitat ==
The yellow-crowned amazon is found in the Amazon basin and Guianas, with additional populations in northwestern South America and Panama. It has been introduced to Grand Cayman. It is a bird of tropical forests (both humid and dry), woodlands, mangroves, and savannas and may also be found on cultivated land and suburban areas. In the southern part of its range, it is rarely found far from the Amazon rainforest. It is mainly a lowland bird, but has locally been recorded up to 800 m (2600 ft) along on the eastern slopes of the Andes. Introduced–and apparently breeding–populations have been reported in Puerto Rico.

A wild colony of around 60 animals has been living in Stuttgart, Germany, since the mid-1980s.

== Behaviour ==
=== Food and feeding ===
They are normally found in pairs or small flocks up to 30, but larger groups may gather at clay licks. Their food includes fruits, nuts, seeds, berries, blossoms and leaf buds. Yellow-crowned amazons are fond of maize and cultivated fruits. Foods with sugar and a large amount of salt can be dangerous for them.

=== Breeding ===
The nest is in a hollow in a tree, palm or termitarium, where they lay two to three eggs. The incubation time is about 26 days and the chicks leave the nest about 60 days from hatching.

== Conservation ==
The yellow-crowned amazon is considered to be of least concern by BirdLife International, and consequently, also by IUCN. Although populations are believed to be in decline, they do not yet approach the threshold specified by BirdLife International to rate the species as near threatened. As is the case with most parrots, it is listed on appendix II of CITES. It occurs in numerous protected areas and remains fairly common throughout a large part of its range.
