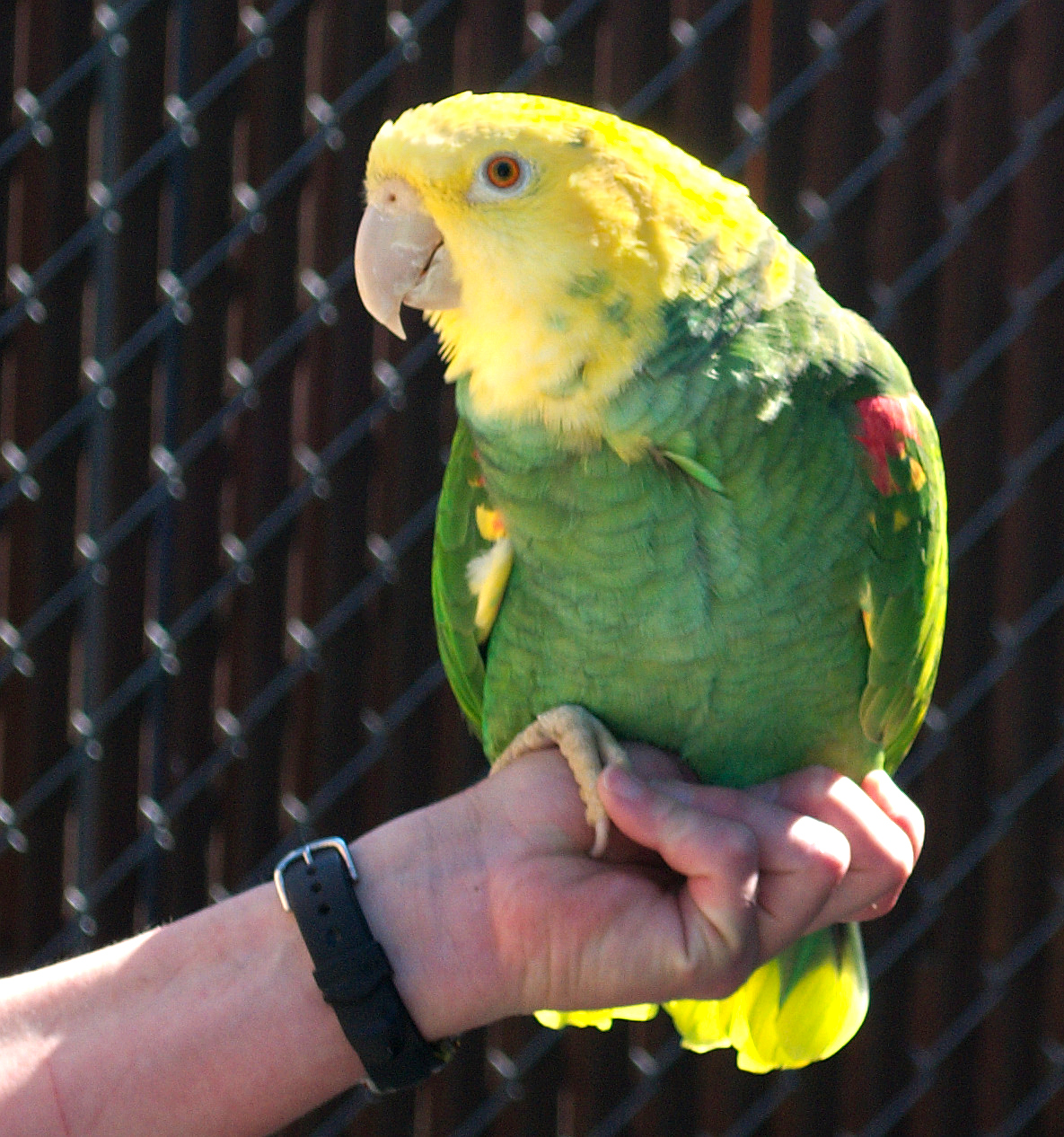
- Tres Marías amazon at Cougar Mountain Zoological Park

Conservation status
- CITES Appendix I

Scientific classification
- Kingdom: Animalia
- Phylum: Chordata
- Class: Aves
- Order: Psittaciformes
- Family: Psittacidae
- Genus: Amazona
- Species: A. oratrix
- Subspecies: A. o. tresmariae

Trinomial name
- Amazona oratrix tresmariae Nelson, 1900

Synonyms
- Amazona tresmariae

= Tres Marías amazon =

Species of bird

The Tres Marías amazon (Amazona oratrix tresmariae) is a subspecies of bird in subfamily Arinae of the family Psittacidae, the African and New World parrots. It is endemic to the Islas Marías off the Pacific coast of Mexico.

== Taxonomy ==
The Tres Marías amazon was formally described in 1900 by the American naturalist Edward William Nelson. He considered it as a subspecies of the yellow-headed amazon (Amazona oratrix) and introduced the trinomial name Amazona oratrix tresmariae. Frank Gill, Pamela Rasmussen and David Donsker in the list maintained on behalf of the International Ornithological Committee (IOC) treat the Tres Marías amazon as a subspecies. BirdLife International's Handbook of the Birds of the World (HBW), the Clements taxonomy, and the Howard and Moore checklist all retain it as a subspecies of the yellow-headed amazon. Prior to 2023, the IOC consisdered the Tres Marías amazon to be a full species, Amazona tresmariae.

== Description ==
The Tres Marías amazon is 35 to 38 cm (14 to 15 in) long. The sexes are the same. Their upperparts are pale grass green with some darker feather tips and paler uppertail coverts. Their head, neck, throat, and upper breast are bright yellow and their lower breast and belly are bluish green. Their tail is mostly green with yellowish green tips and red at the base of the outer feathers. The leading edge of their wing and their carpal area are red. Their primaries and inner secondaries have green bases, the outer secondaries have red bases, and all are blue to blackish or bluish violet at the end. The rest of their underwing is green. Their iris is orange or amber, their bill pale to grayish horn-colored, and their legs and feet gray.

== Distribution and habitat ==
The Tres Marías amazon is restricted to the Islas Marías, a small archipelago about 100 km (62 mi) off the coast of Nayarit. It primarily inhabits forest but has been noted roosting in Agave plantations.

== Behavior ==
=== Feeding ===
The diet of the Tres Marías amazon has not been described separately from that of the yellow-headed parrot sensu lato, which like most Amazonas parrots feeds mostly on seeds and fruits.

=== Breeding ===
The breeding biology of the Tres Marías amazon has not been described separately from that of the yellow-headed parrot. That species as a whole nests in tree cavities. Their clutch size is two or three eggs.

=== Vocalization ===
As of early 2023 xeno-canto had no recordings of Tres Marías amazon vocalizations and the Cornell Lab of Ornithology's Macaulay Library had very few.

== In aviculture ==
In aviculture, a variety of yellow-headed amazon has been selectively bred to maximize the yellow coloration of the head. Called the "Magna", it closely resembles the Tres Marías amazon.

Stoodley, J. 1990, Genus Amazona, reports A.o.'magna' to be a naturally occurring variation within the A.o.oratrix species dynamics, and is most prevalent in the wild state in the Mexican state of Tamaulipas, adjacent to the Gulf of Mexico, south of Monterey. Because of the bird's advanced colouring, it has been selected in preference to other colour forms of A.o.oratrix in aviculture but not bred as a mutation or selectively colour enhanced variation to the 'norm'. Smith, D. 2025

== Status ==
The IUCN follows HBW taxonomy, and so has not assessed the Tres Marías amazon separately from the yellow-headed amazon sensu lato. The species as a whole is Endangered, with an estimated population of 4700 mature individuals that is believed to be decreasing. Illegal capture for the pet trade has caused much of the decline and ongoing habitat loss is another significant threat. The Convention on International Trade in Endangered Species of Wild Fauna and Flora (CITES) lists the yellow-headed amazon in Appendix I.
