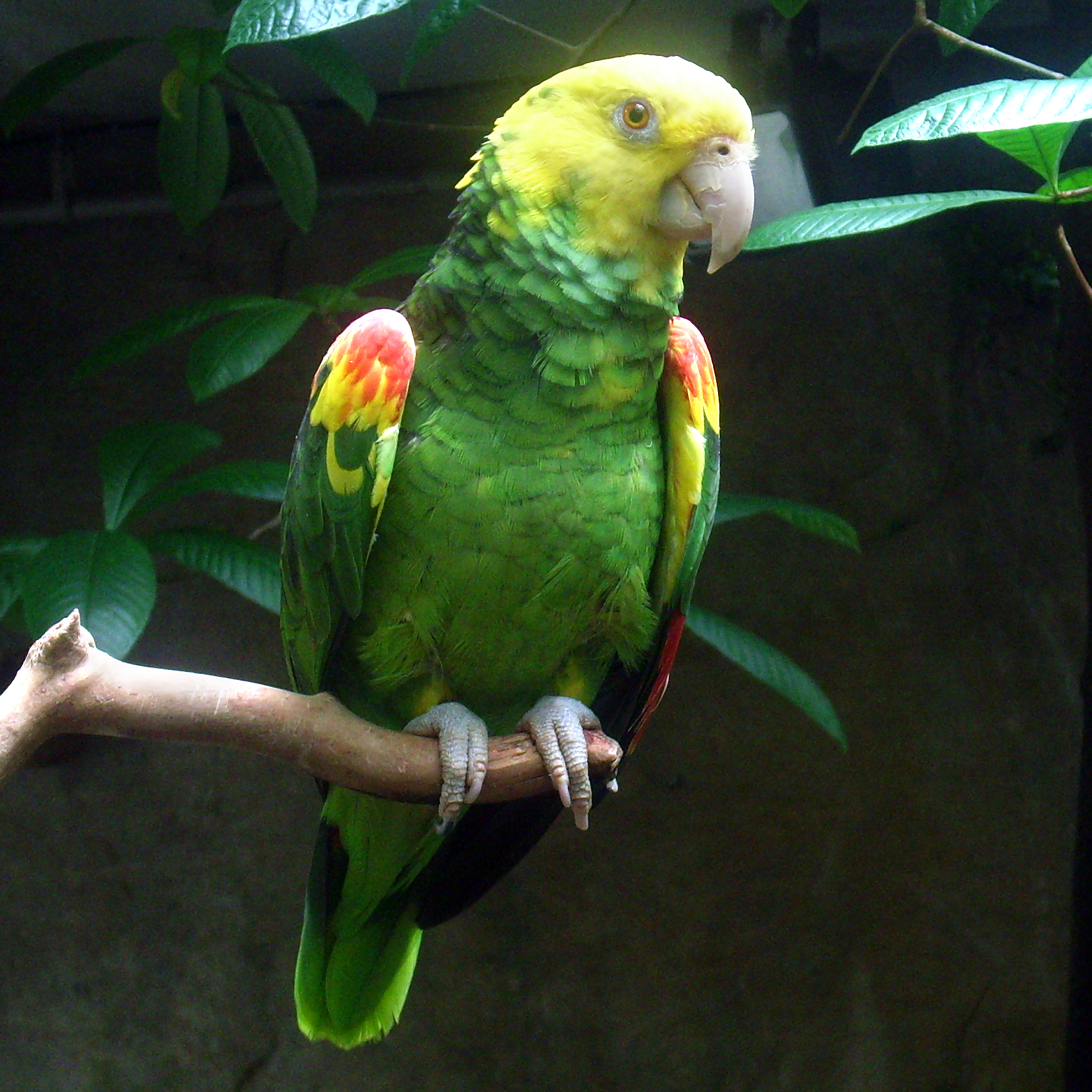
- At Vancouver Aquarium

Conservation status
- Endangered (IUCN 3.1)
- CITES Appendix I

Scientific classification
- Kingdom: Animalia
- Phylum: Chordata
- Class: Aves
- Order: Psittaciformes
- Family: Psittacidae
- Genus: Amazona
- Species: A. oratrix

Binomial name
- Amazona oratrix Ridgway, 1887

Synonyms
- Amazona ochrocephala oratrix

= Yellow-headed amazon =

Subspecies of Amazon Parrot

The yellow-headed amazon (Amazona oratrix), also known as the yellow-headed parrot and double yellow-headed amazon, is an endangered amazon parrot of Mexico and northern Central America. Measuring 38–43 centimetres (15–17 in) in length, it is a stocky short-tailed green parrot with a yellow head. It prefers to live in mangrove forests or forests near rivers or other bodies of water. It is sometimes considered a subspecies of the yellow-crowned amazon (Amazona ochrocephala). It is a popular pet and an excellent talker. Poaching for the international pet trade has driven the species to near-extinction in the wild; around half of all wild-caught birds are thought to die in the process.

== Taxonomy ==
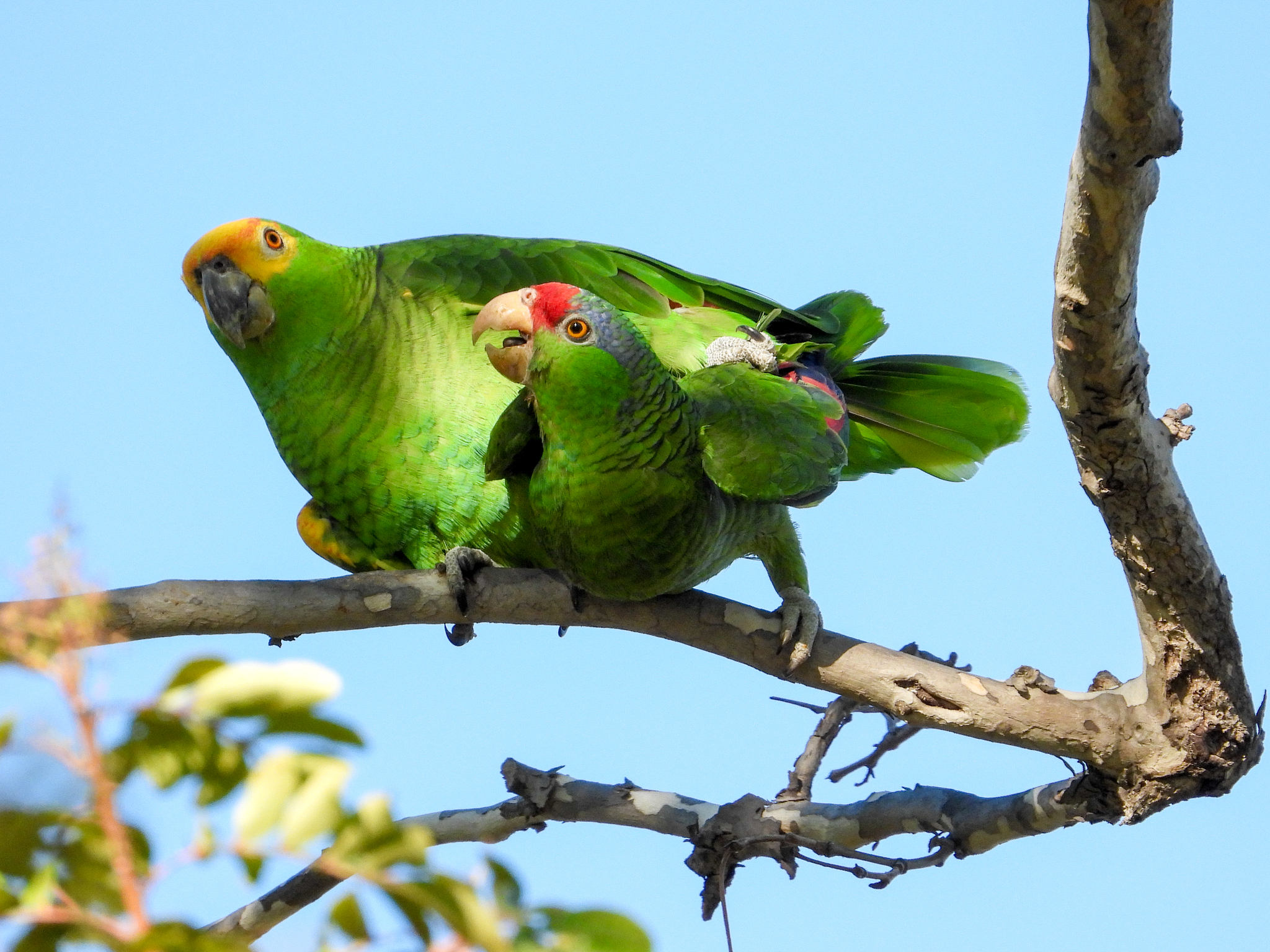
Mating with a red-crowned amazon, in California

This species is part of the Amazona ochrocephala complex, which also includes the yellow-naped amazon (A. auropalliata). This complex, which has been called "a taxonomic headache", is considered a single species by some authorities and split into three species by others. The split is mainly based on the amount of yellow in the plumage, the color of the legs and bill, the proximity of A. oratrix and A. auropalliata in Oaxaca, Mexico, without apparent interbreeding, and the presence of both A. ochrocephala and A. auropalliata in northern Honduras. This evaluation has, however, been confused by misunderstandings regarding the plumage variations in the populations in northern Honduras, where birds vary greatly in amount of yellow on the head, crown and nape, but have pale bills and a juvenile plumage matching A. oratrix, but neither A. ochrocephala nor A. auropalliata.

In 1997, the population from the Sula Valley in northern Honduras was described as a new subspecies, hondurensis, of A. oratrix. A. auropalliata caribaea on the Islas de la Bahía, which is relatively close to the recently described A. oratrix hondurensis, may have a relatively pale lower mandible, indicating that gene flow may occur between the two. If confirmed, this could suggest that the two are better considered conspecific. Alternatively, it has been suggested that caribaea and parvipes, both typically considered subspecies of A. auropalliata, may be closer to A. oratrix than they are to the nominate A. auropalliata. Both are relatively small and have red on the shoulder like A. oratrix, but unlike nominate A. auropalliata. The members of this complex are known to hybridize in captivity, and recent phylogenetic analysis of DNA did not support the split into the three "traditional" biological species, but did reveal three clades, which potentially could be split into three phylogenetic species: a Mexican and Central American species (including panamensis, which extends slightly into South America), a species of northern South America, and a species from the southern Amazon Basin. The Central American clade can potentially be split further, with panamensis (the Panama amazon) and tresmariae (the Tres Marías amazon) recognized as two monotypic species.

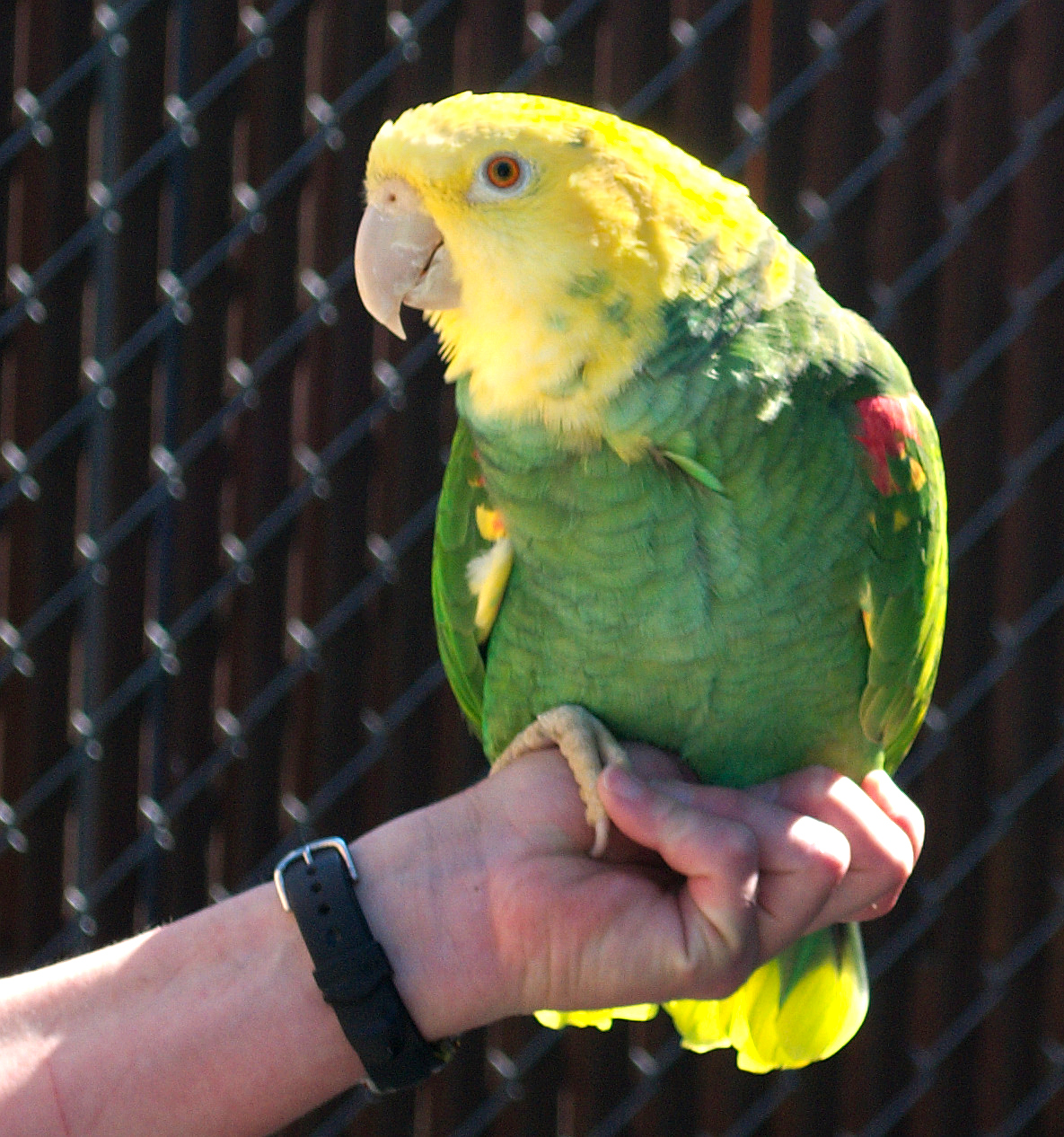
Tres Marías amazon at Cougar Mountain Zoological Park, United States

According to the traditional split, A. oratrix includes the taxa tresmariae (from the Tres Marías Islands), belizensis (from Belize) and hondurensis (from the Sula Valley in northern Honduras) as subspecies. An additional subspecies, magna, has sometimes been recognized for the population on the Gulf slope of Mexico, but today most authorities consider it invalid, instead including this population in oratrix, which also occurs on the Pacific slope of Mexico. In contrast, the population in northwestern Honduras and adjacent eastern Guatemala (near Puerto Barrios), which resembles A. oratrix belizensis and commonly is included in that subspecies, may represent an undescribed subspecies. It has sometimes been referred to as guatemalensis, but until this population is officially described, the name remains provisional.

=== Etymology ===
The origin of the common epithet "double yellow-headed" is that this species is differentiated from the others in the yellow-headed amazon complex by possessing both the yellow nape and yellow crown of its two close relatives, hence a "double-yellow" head.

== Distribution and habitat ==
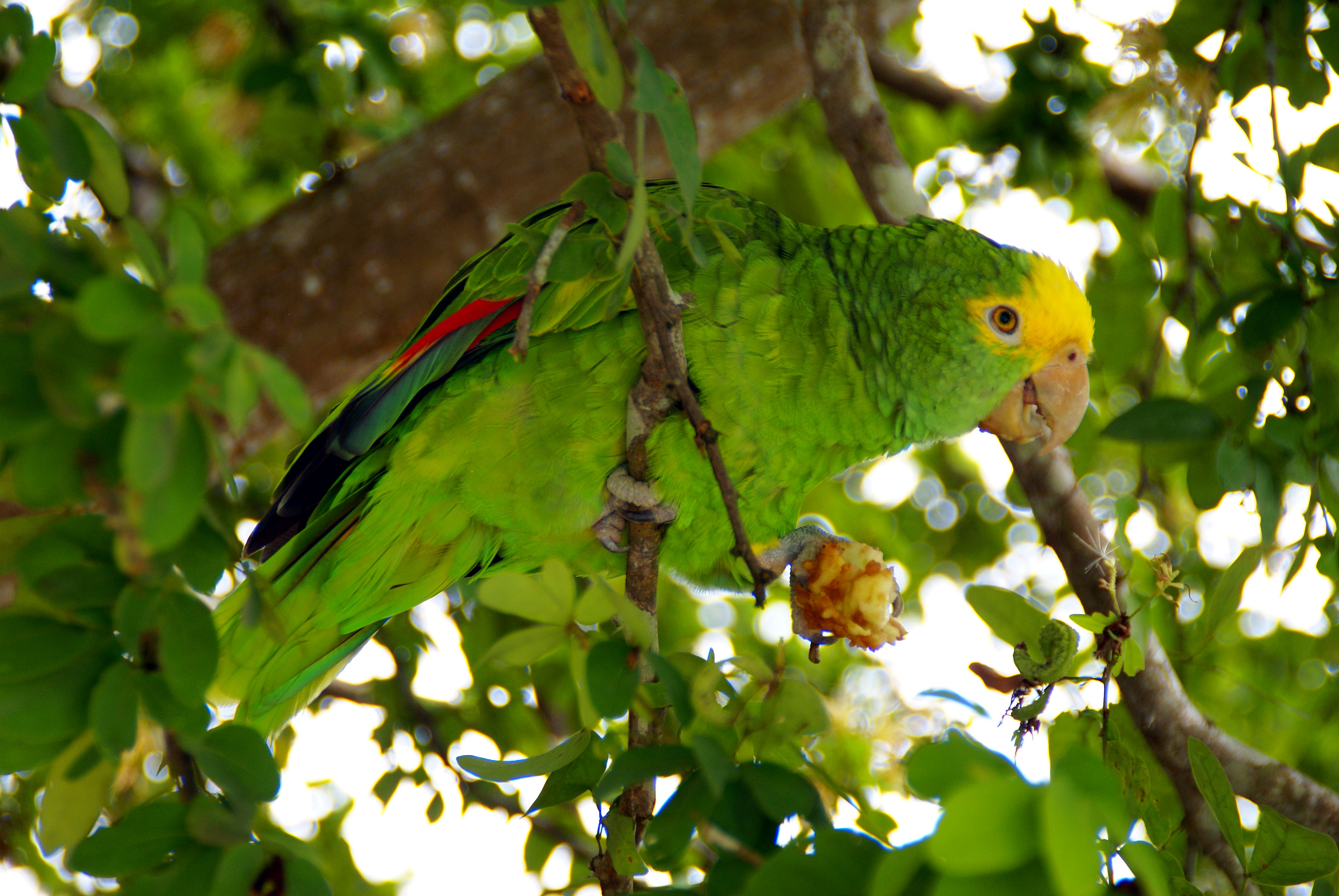
In Belize

This species lives in riparian forest and areas with scattered trees, as well as evergreen forest in Belize and mangroves in Guatemala. A notable ecoregion of occurrence is the Belizean pine forests. It occurs singly or in pairs, in small groups, and occasionally in big flocks. The range formerly included both coastal slopes of Mexico from the Tres Marías Islands and Jalisco to Oaxaca and from Nuevo León to northern Chiapas and southwestern Tabasco, as well as a disjunct area including most of Belize, and another comprising a small part of northeastern Guatemala and northwestern Honduras. However, their numbers have been reduced drastically—by 90%, to 7,000, from the mid-1970s to 1994, and by 68% from 1994 to 2004—because of capture for the pet trade and habitat destruction.

Introduced populations can be found in Stuttgart, Germany, where a recent population of over 50 individuals resides. Smaller introduced populations are to be found in coastal neighborhoods of San Diego, California, including Coronado, Ocean Beach, Pacific Beach, Point Loma, La Jolla, and Imperial Beach; they are also found in Santa Ana, Loma Linda and Pasadena, all also in Southern California. In addition, introduced—and apparently breeding— populations have been reported in Puerto Rico.

== Description ==
The yellow-headed amazon averages 38–43 centimetres (15–17 in) long. The shape is typical of amazons, with a robust build, rounded wings, and a square tail. The body is bright green, with yellow on the head, dark scallops on the neck, red at the bend of the wing, and yellow thighs. The flight feathers are blackish to bluish violet with a red patch on the outer secondaries. The base of the tail also has a red patch, which is usually hidden. The outer tail feathers have yellowish tips.

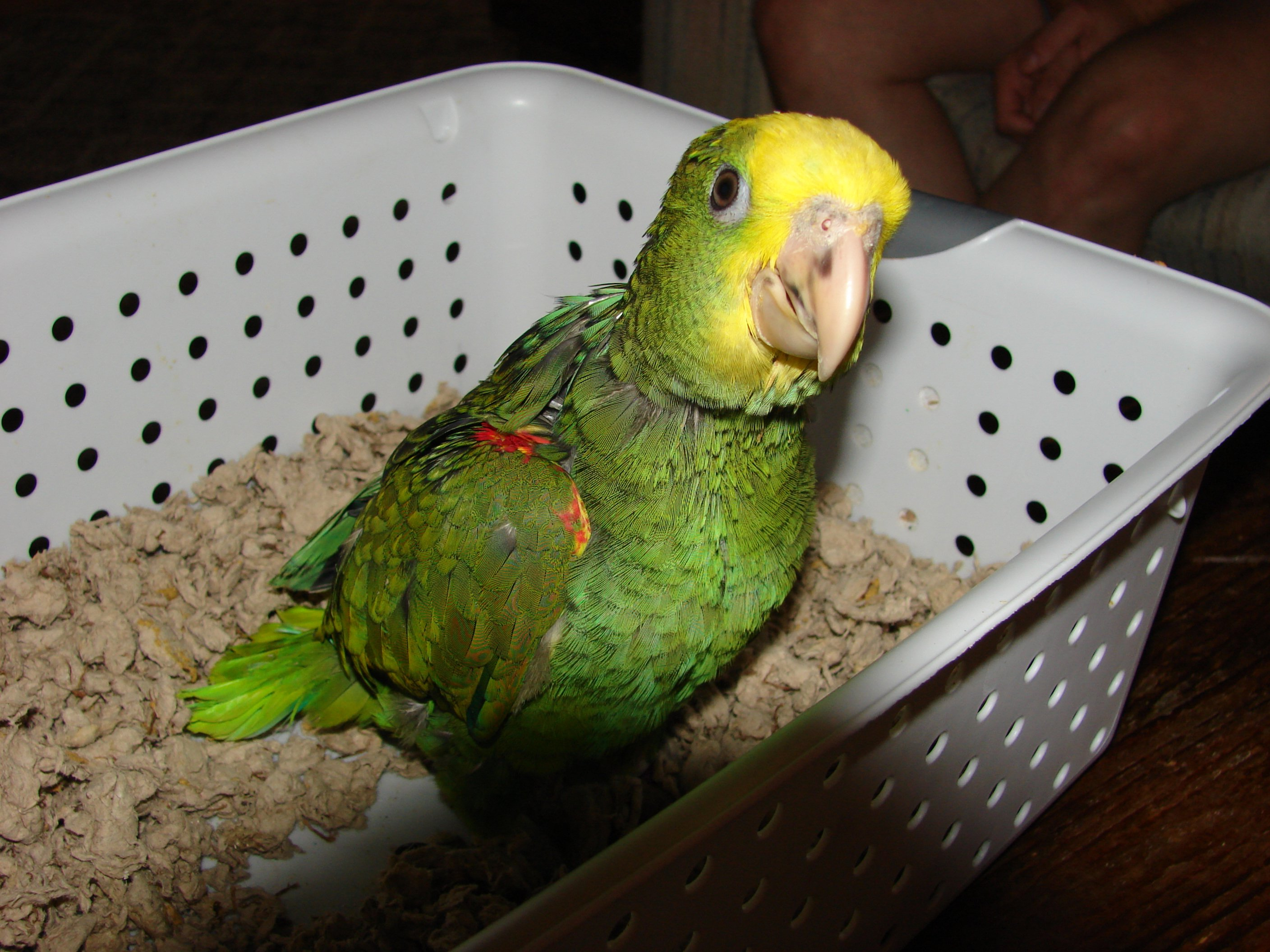
8 weeks old.

The bill is horn-colored (gray), darker in immatures of the Belizean subspecies. The eye ring is whitish in Mexican birds and grayish in others. The most conspicuous geographical difference is the amount of yellow. In adults, the head and upper chest are yellow in the subspecies of the Tres Marías Islands (tresmariae); just the head in the widespread subspecies of Mexico (oratrix); just the crown in Belize (belizensis); and the crown and nape in the Sula Valley of Honduras (hondurensis, which thus resembles the yellow-naped parrot). Immatures have less yellow than adults; they attain adult plumage in 2 to 4 years.

The variety "Magna" (or "Magnum") is bred for more yellow and commands a premium price as a pet. Some "extreme" Magnas have as much yellow as Tres Marías birds, but are distinguished from them by heavier barring on the chest and a less bluish tint to the green plumage.

Wild birds give low-pitched, sometimes human-sounding screams, but often fly silently (unlike many other parrots). The calls can be described as "a rolled kyaa-aa-aaah and krra-aah-aa-ow, a deep, rolled ahrrrr or ahrhrrrr," etc. Young birds make a "clucking" sound to indicate that they are hungry.

== Conservation status ==
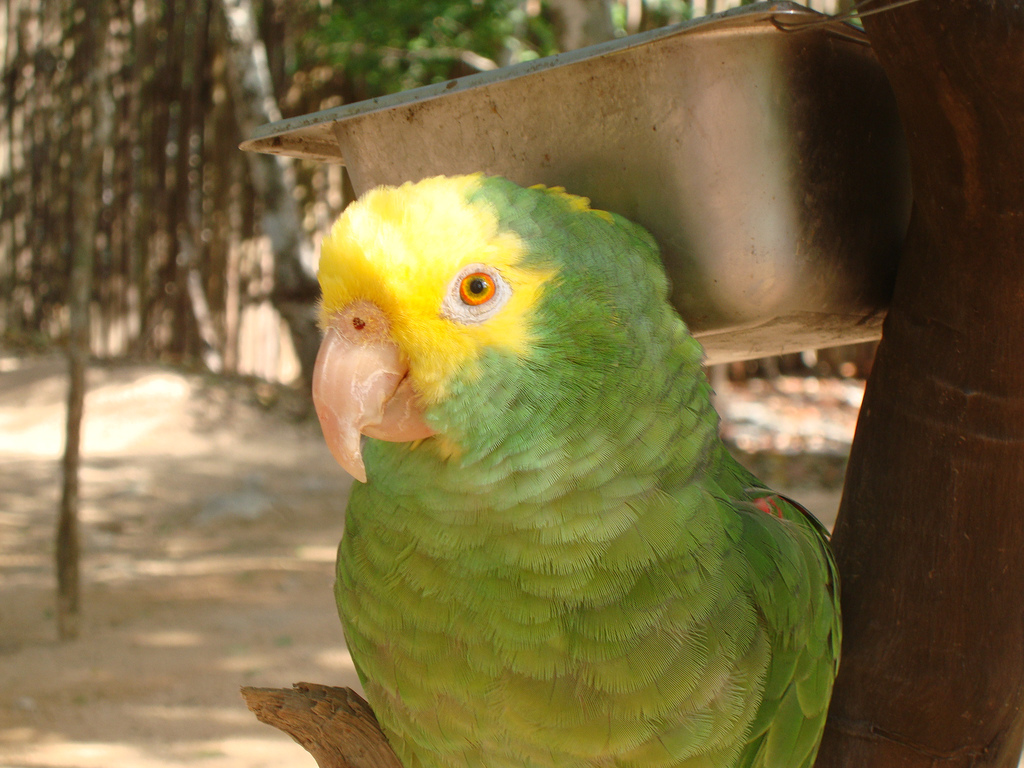
Upper body

The yellow-headed amazon is considered endangered by the IUCN, and is listed under CITES Appendix I, which regulates the international trade of the species including those bred in captivity through a permitting system. Populations range from Central America, through Mexico, and even into the southmost region of Texas. There is an approved CITES Captive breeding program established for this species near Canberra in Australia, located at Priam Psittaculture Centre. Providing a sustainable managed breeding program to assist elevating pressures on wild populations for use in avicultural, research and pets.https://cites.org/eng/common/reg/cb/AU

The popularity of yellow-headed amazons as a pet continues to fuel poaching efforts, which have nearly driven it to extinction in the wild. Their wild population has declined from 70,000 to 7,000 in the past two decades alone. An estimated 40–60% of poached yellow-headed amazons die before they are sold. The situation for tresmariae, which potentially can be treated as a separate species, is unclear, but its very small range gives cause for concern and some reports indicate it is under considerable threat.

Unscrupulous bird traders may sometimes bleach or dye the feathers of more common parrot species, such as the white-fronted amazon in order to pass them off for sale as (more expensive) yellow-headed amazons. This cruel treatment is often fatal for the birds involved.

== As pets ==
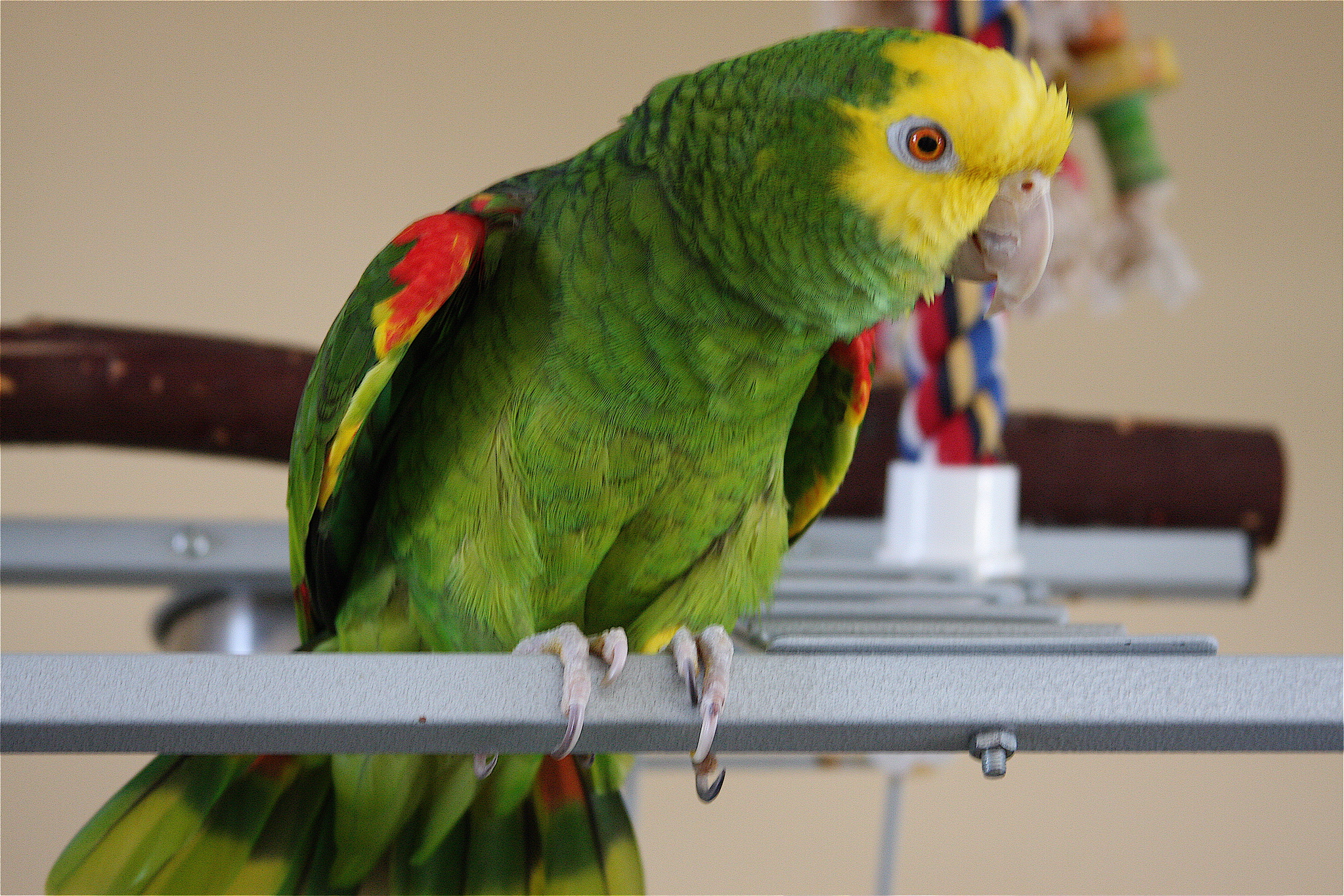
Pet parrot

Though only captive-bred yellow-headed amazons may be owned, these are widely available (if somewhat expensive) and their personalities make them highly desirable pets; they have been kept as such for centuries because they are among the parrots that "talk" best. Their vocal abilities are generally bested only by the grey parrot and matched by similar species, such as the yellow-naped parrot. Yellow-headed amazons in captivity appear to have an affinity for both singing and the learning of song—and a naturally powerful, operatic voice.

As in most amazons, nervous plucking of plumage is rare among this species. A generally recognized disadvantage of the yellow-headed amazon and its close relatives (such as the yellow-naped amazon) is hormonal aggressiveness, most notable among males in the breeding season. It is a member of the "Hot Three" (referring to the male bird's "hot" temper), along with the yellow-naped and blue-fronted. Yellow-headed amazons are known for being "one person birds"—bonding to one human, to whom they become fiercely loyal. It is possible, albeit difficult, to mitigate this behavior by ensuring that the bird receives regular and equal attention from other members of the household.

Captive yellow-headed amazons are known for having a large appetite and an appreciation of a wide variety of foods. They are prone to obesity and nutritional deficiencies if the parrot's owner fails to provide adequate opportunities for play and exercise, and overindulges the parrot with treats and table scraps. The World Parrot Trust recommends that yellow-headed amazons be kept in an enclosure with a minimum length of 3 metres at a temperature no lower than 10°C.
