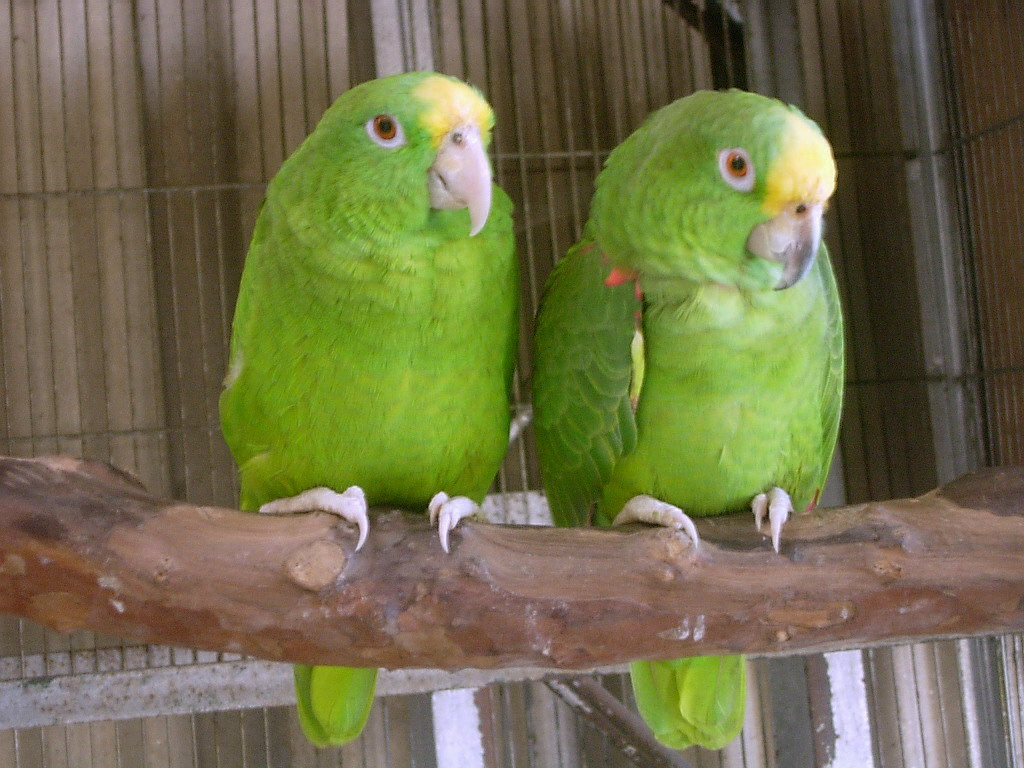

Scientific classification
- Kingdom: Animalia
- Phylum: Chordata
- Class: Aves
- Order: Psittaciformes
- Family: Psittacidae
- Genus: Amazona
- Species: A. ochrocephala
- Subspecies: A. o. panamensis

Trinomial name
- Amazona ochrocephala panamensis Cabanis, 1874

Synonyms
- Amazona panamensis

= Panama amazon =

Subspecies of bird

The Panama amazon, also known as the panamanian parrot, Panama yellow-headed amazon, (Amazona ochrocephala panamensis) is a subspecies of the yellow-crowned amazon, and is endemic to Panama (including the Pearl Islands and Coiba) and northwest Colombia. In aviculture, it is sometimes listed as a separate species (Amazona panamensis), and this is potentially correct; at least as a phylogenetic species.

== Description ==
Adults are approximately 35 centimetres (13.8 in) in length, are bright green with a yellow area on the forehead, and a horn-colored (gray) beak, sometimes with a dark tip, but lacking the reddish coloring on the upper mandible that is present in the nominate yellow-crowned amazon. The plumage of the body is green with a little coloring at the brims of the wings. The yellow on the crown is more restricted, and tends to be triangular, compared with the more extensive and rounder distribution of yellow on the nominate race. There is much variation in coloring among individuals.

== Aviculture ==
Because they are highly sought after as pets and because of trapping of wild birds, which is now illegal, there has been a population decline. This has made them difficult to find. Panama amazons are extremely playful, can be excellent talkers and tend to be loud at times; much like the (nominate) yellow-crowned, yellow-headed and yellow-naped amazons. Though their body language is the same, Panama amazons are much less likely to become physically aggressive. Many other amazon parrots are erroneously sold as Panama amazons, because of their scarcity and popularity.
