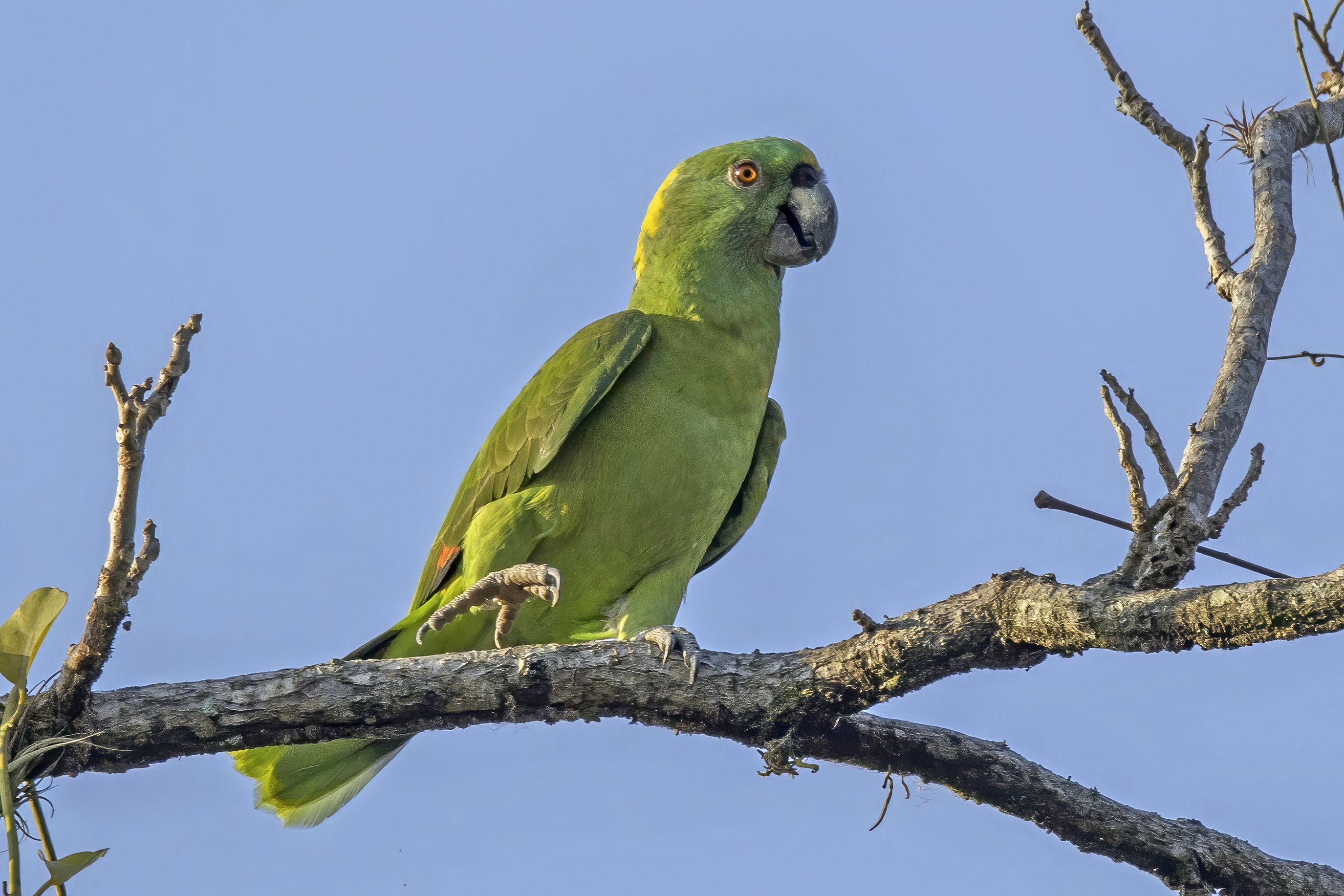
- Suchitepéquez Department, Guatemala

Conservation status
- Critically Endangered (IUCN 3.1)
- CITES Appendix I

Scientific classification
- Kingdom: Animalia
- Phylum: Chordata
- Class: Aves
- Order: Psittaciformes
- Family: Psittacidae
- Genus: Amazona
- Species: A. auropalliata

Binomial name
- Amazona auropalliata (Lesson, RP, 1842)

Synonyms
- Amazona ochrocephala auropalliata

= Yellow-naped amazon =

Species of bird

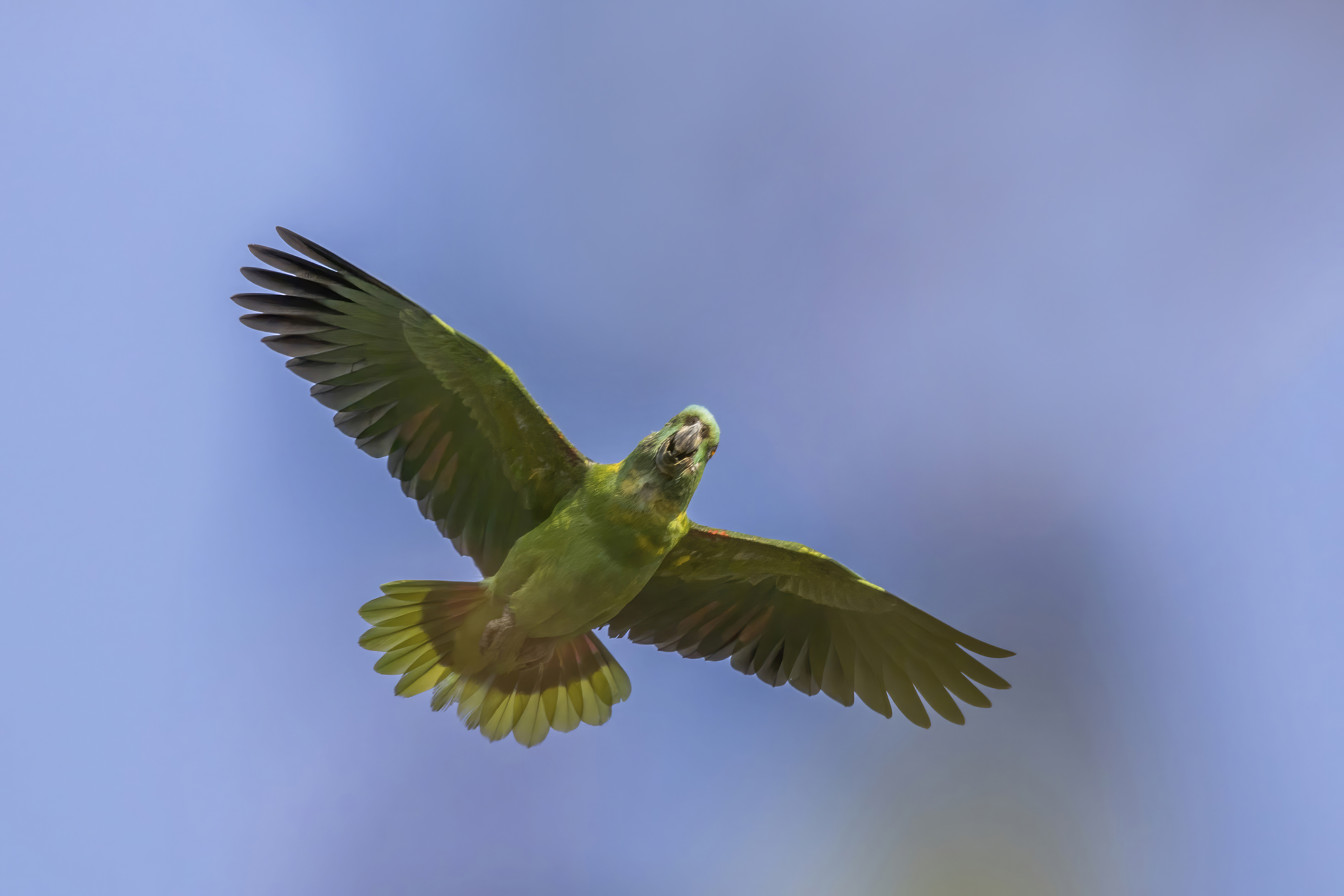
Suchitepéquez Department, Guatemala

The yellow-naped amazon or yellow-naped parrot (Amazona auropalliata) is a widespread amazon parrot sometimes considered to be a subspecies of the yellow-crowned amazon (Amazona ochrocephala). It inhabits the Pacific coast of southern Mexico and Central America. It has recently been reclassified as Critically Endangered by the IUCN Red List due to a dramatic decline across the extent of its range. Yellow-naped amazons have lost more than 92% of their population over the last three generations.

The primary cause for their population decline are deforestation and illegal removal of young for the parrot trade. This parrot readily mimics sounds, and in captivity, this includes human speech, which is probably the reason it is popular in aviculture. Like all parrots, however, mimicking abilities vary greatly between individuals. Recent surveys of the Costa Rican population across an 11-year time span found a significant decline in their population. Despite this decline, the Costa Rican population is considered to be the stronghold for the species.

== Description ==
The yellow-naped amazon is distinguished by its green forehead and crown and a yellow band across the lower nape (back part of neck) and hindneck. The eyes are orange, beak is dark gray and is paler towards the base of the upper mandible. The feet are also dark gray.

Yellow-naped amazons inhabit dry forest and mangrove habitat of the tropics, and nest in naturally occurring cavities Although yellow-naped amazons will not excavate cavities, they will chew the entrance. The parrots will nest in a wide variety of trees, although dead Coyols (palm trees) are one preferred species. During the breeding season, pairs are monogamous, and pairs defend small breeding territories around the nest by duetting with their partners. Breeding success is low (89%), and the majority of nests fail due to poaching

The vocal behavior of yellow-naped amazons has been more extensively studied than in any other wild parrot. Yellow-naped amazons, like all parrots, exhibit vocal learning behavior in the wild. This behavior manifests in the form of vocal dialects, in which the repertoire of calls that parrots vocalize change at discrete geographic boundaries, similar to how humans have different languages or dialects. These dialects also are meaningful to the parrots; they are less responsive to calls that are not their own dialect. Dialects are also stable over long periods of time.

Mated pairs of yellow-naped amazons also duet together on their territories in highly complex ways; they produce precisely coordinated and synchronized sequences of calls. These duets are organized by syntactic rules, in which the order and structure of notes changes in predetermined but flexible ways. Neighboring pairs of birds will counter-duet, in which pairs will rapidly exchange duets. This behavior appears similar to the counter-singing observed in male songbirds. These displays will at times become so heated that physical fights will occur at territory boundaries, although these are rare.

== Taxonomy ==
Three subspecies are recognized:

- A. a. auropalliata: Southern Mexico to northwestern Costa Rica.
- A. a. parvipes: The Mosquito Coast in eastern Honduras and northeastern Nicaragua.
- A. a. caribaea: Bay Islands, Honduras.

== Range and habitat ==
It is found along the Pacific Coast from southern Mexico south to northern Costa Rica. Recent census efforts have indicated declining populations throughout much of the range, with reduced populations in Costa Rica and Nicaragua and vanishingly small populations in Honduras, Mexico and Guatemala (Dupin et al. 2020, Wright et al. 2018). The Mesoamerican Parrot Census Network, with support of the World Parrot Trust, has been engaging volunteers to assess the status of yellow-naped amazons across their range to assist with conservation.

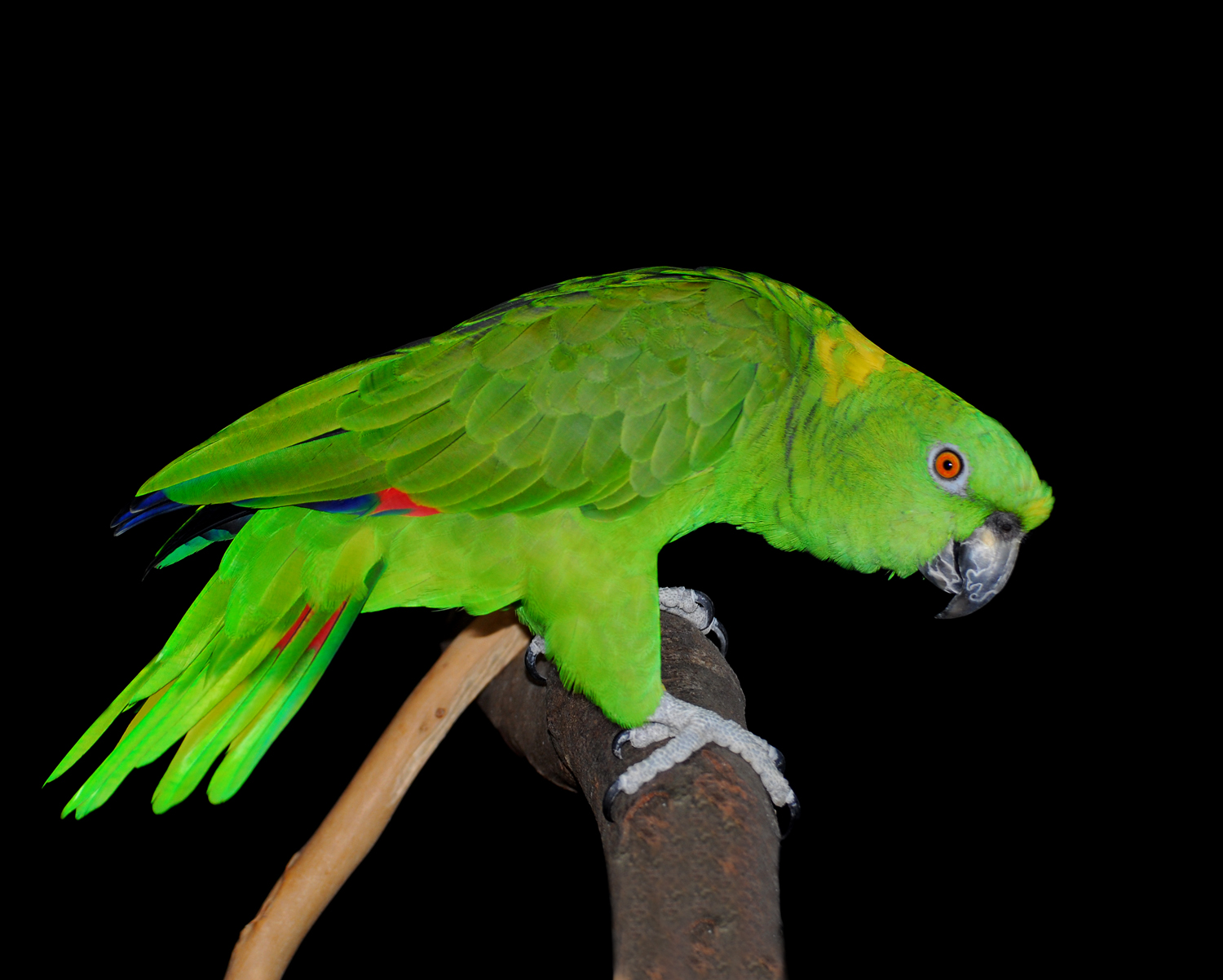
Adult

In common with many parrot species, it feeds on nuts, berries, seeds, and fruit.

== In captivity ==
Yellow-naped amazons are highly sought after for their talking ability and playful personalities. They are also known for nest-protective behaviors that often lead them to bite. This is particularly common in males during the breeding season. While they do not always handle emotions well, they will signal when stressed or over excited by spreading (fanning) their tail and eye pinning (contracting and expanding the pupils of their eyes). If they are allowed to calm down before they are handled, bites are not common. Yellow-naped amazons, as with many other parrots, tend to bond with one member of a household and may be jealous of others.

Yellow-naped amazons do enjoy the stimulation of interacting with people, however. The more they are socialized, the more comfortable they will be around humans and animals.

Yellow-naped amazons are cavity-nesting birds in their wild habitat, therefore they enjoy chewing. Because of this, they should be supplied with bird-safe and non-toxic toys to chew. They also enjoy manipulating objects and interacting with them.

Parrot chewing

A rare blue mutation of the yellow-naped amazon is known to exist in which the entire body is turquoise in color.
