= Japanese cruiser Katori =

Japanese WWII era light cruiser

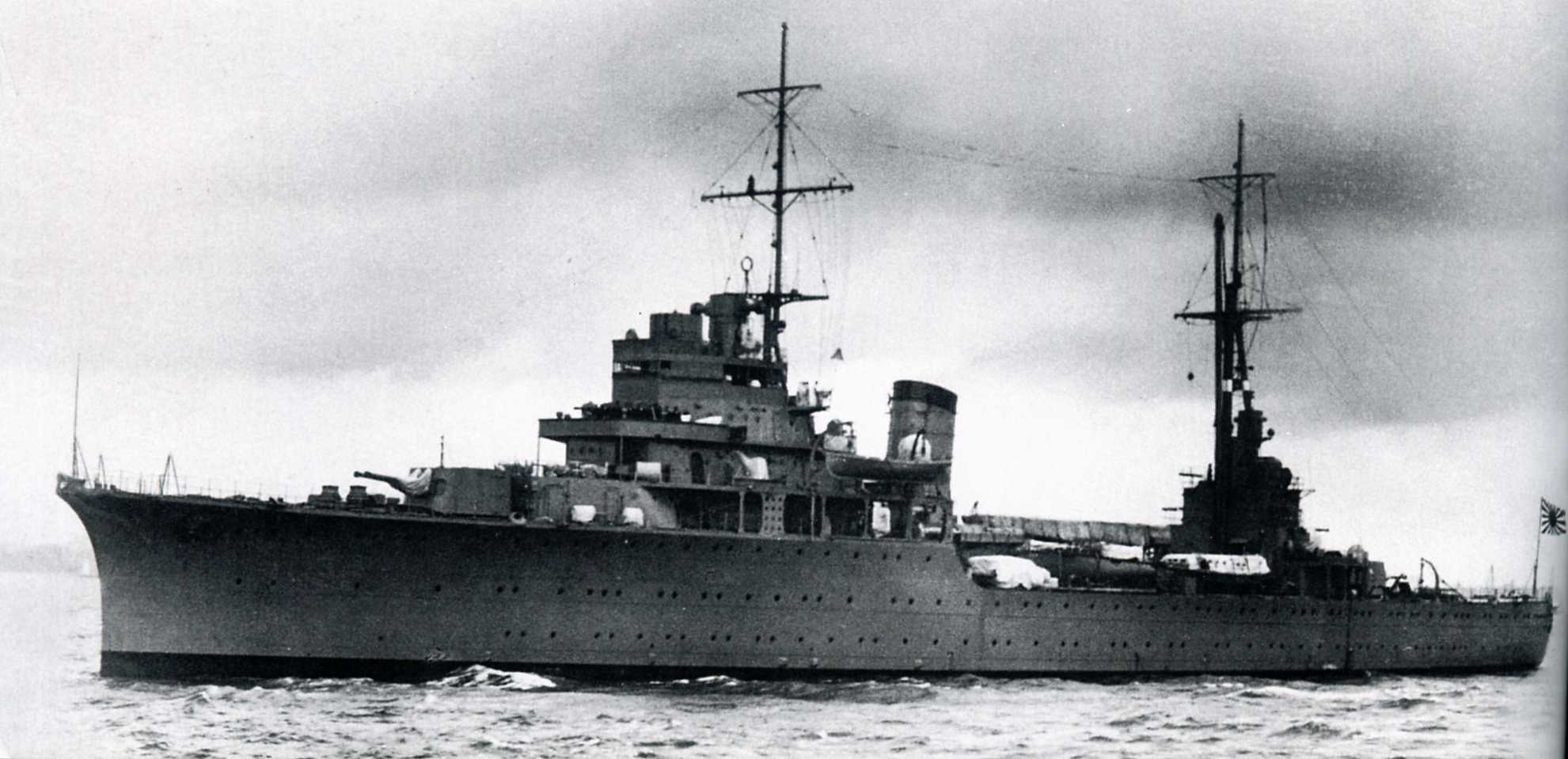
- Katori

History

Empire of Japan
- Name: Katori
- Namesake: Katori Shrine
- Ordered: 1938 Fiscal Year
- Builder: Mitsubishi
- Laid down: 24 August 1938
- Launched: 17 June 1939
- Commissioned: 20 April 1940
- Stricken: 31 March 1944
- Fate: sunk 19 February 1944; by USS Iowa (BB-61) off Truk; 07°45′N 151°20′E

General characteristics
- Class & type: Katori-class cruiser
- Displacement: 5,890 tons (standard); 6,180 tons (full load)
- Length: 129.77 m (425 ft 9 in)
- Beam: 15.95 m (52 ft 4 in)
- Draught: 5.75 m (18 ft 10 in)
- Propulsion: 2-shaft geared turbines plus diesel motors; 3 Kampon boilers; 8,000 shp (6,000 kW)
- Speed: 18 knots (33 km/h)
- Range: 9,000 nautical miles (17,000 km) at 10 knots (19 km/h)
- Complement: 315
- Armament: 4 × 140 mm (5.5 in)/50 caliber guns(2x2); 2 × 127 mm (5 in)/40 caliber AA guns (1x2); 4 × 25 mm Type 96 AA guns (later increased to 30); 8 × 13.2 mm (0.52 in) AA guns; 4 × 533 mm torpedo tubes (2x2)
- Aircraft carried: 1 x floatplane, 1 catapult

Katori (香取) was the lead ship of the Katori class of three light cruisers which served with the Imperial Japanese Navy during World War II. The ship was named after the noted Shinto Katori Shrine in Chiba prefecture, Japan.

== Background ==
Katori-class cruisers were originally ordered to serve as training ships in the 1937 and 1939 Supplementary Naval budget. With the Pacific War, they were used as administrative flagships for various fleets, such as submarine command and control, and to command escort squadrons. The ships were upgraded as the war progressed with additional anti-aircraft guns and depth charges.

== Service career ==
=== Early career ===
Katori was completed at the Mitsubishi Yokohama shipyards on 20 April 1940 and was based at nearby Yokosuka.

On 28 July 1940, Katori and her sister ship, Kashima, participated in the last pre-war midshipman cruise, visiting Etajima, Mutsu, Dairen, Port Arthur, and Shanghai.

=== Early stages of the Pacific War ===
On 11 November 1941 Vice Admiral Mitsumi Shimizu, CINC, Sixth Fleet (Submarines) convened a briefing of his commanders aboard the Sixth Fleet's flagship, Katori on the planned attack on Pearl Harbor. Katori departed for Truk on 24 November 1941. At the time of the Pearl Harbor attack, Katori was at Kwajalein in the Marshall Islands.

On 10 December 1941, the submarine I-6 reported sighting the aircraft carrier USS Lexington and two cruisers heading northeast, and Vice Admiral Shimizu ordered his submarines to pursue and sink the carrier, but it escaped.

Katori returned to Truk by the end of 1941, and on 3 January 1942 Vice Admiral Shimizu held a briefing to discuss the details of the invasion plans for "Operation R" (the invasions of Rabaul and Kavieng), which took place from 23 to 24 January 1942.

On 1 February 1942, Katori came under attack at Kwajalein by Douglas SBD Dauntlesses of VB-6 and VS-6 and Douglas TBD Devastators from the carrier USS Enterprise. Vice Admiral Shimizu was wounded in the raid, and Katori sustained enough damage to warrant a return to Yokosuka for repairs. The ship returned to Kwajalein in May, where on 24 May 1942 the new admiral, of the Sixth Fleet (Submarines) Vice Admiral Marquis Teruhisa Komatsu, ordered Captain Sasaki Hankyu detachment of midget submarines to stage the attack on Sydney Harbour.

Katori returned briefly to Yokosuka in August 1942 for upgrading with two twin Type 96 25 mm AA guns, which were fitted in the forward part of the bridge. It then returned to Truk, where it continued to be based (with occasional returns to Yokosuka).

On 21 June 1943 Vice Admiral Takeo Takagi assumed command of the Sixth Fleet (Submarines), but after the fall of Kwajalein Katori was reassigned on 15 February 1944 to the General Escort Command.

=== Attack on Truk ===
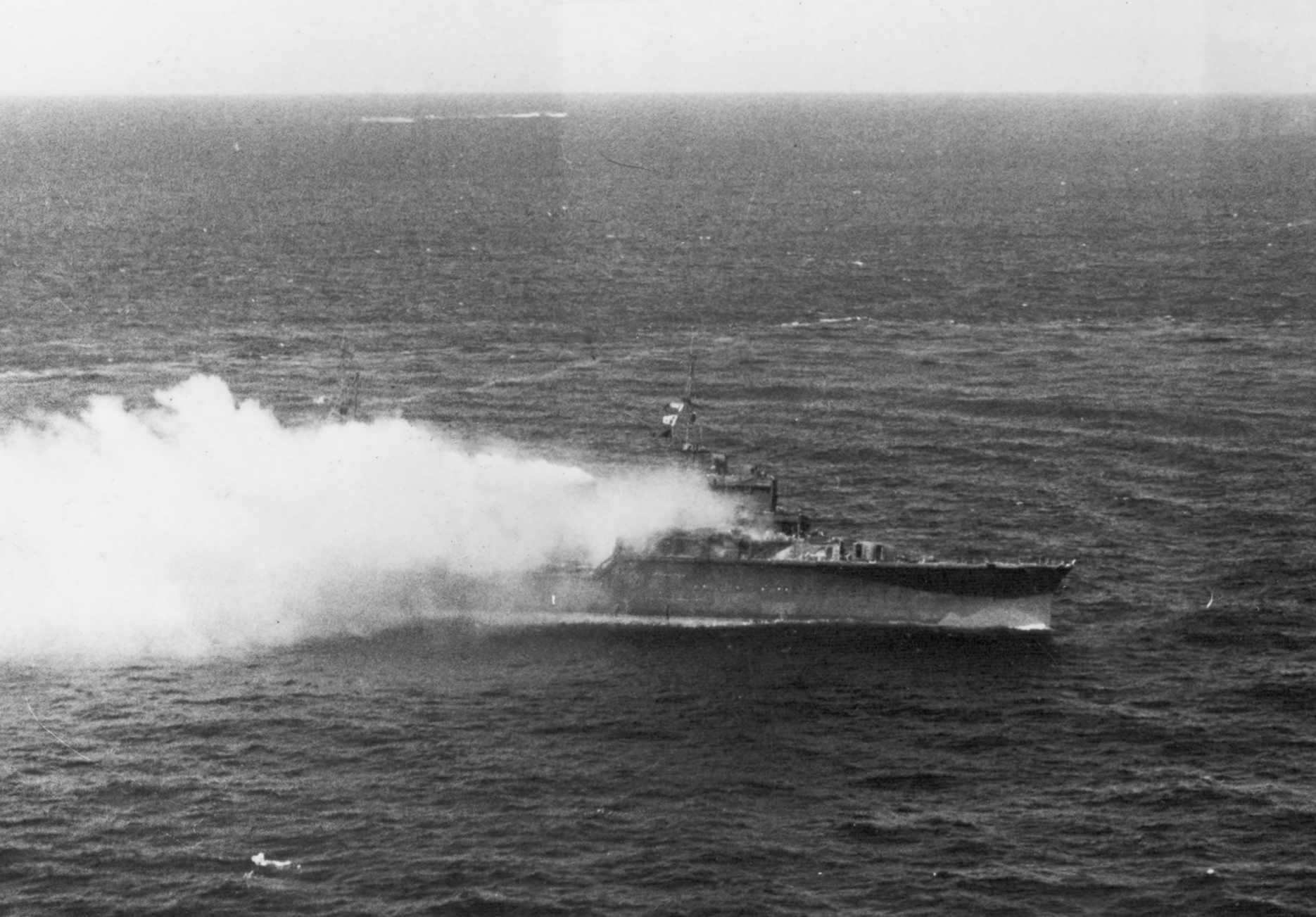
Katori burning off Truk, 17 February 1944

In the American attack on Truk of 17–18 February 1944, the American Task Force 58 with nine aircraft carriers, supported by six battleships, ten cruisers and 28 destroyers, launched a massive attack on Truk. Katori had departed Truk shortly before the attack, escorting the armed merchant cruiser Akagi Maru, destroyers Maikaze and Nowaki, and minesweeping trawler Shonan Maru No. 15 towards Yokosuka, but came under attack by Grumman F6F Hellcat fighters and Grumman TBF Avenger torpedo-bombers from the carriers Yorktown, Intrepid, Essex, Bunker Hill and Cowpens. Akagi Maru was sunk, and Katori was hit by a torpedo which did minor damage. Although aircraft could have finished off Katori, Admiral Spruance wanted a surface engagement, so Admiral Mitscher waved off further air attacks on the damaged light cruiser. Because of this, several hours later, Task Group 50.9's battleships New Jersey and Iowa, along with cruisers Minneapolis and New Orleans and destroyers Bradford and Burns, spotted the Katori group and opened fire. The screening destroyers fired six salvos of torpedoes at Katori (which was already listing slightly to port and on fire amidships), but all torpedoes missed. Katori responded with a salvo of torpedoes which were equally ineffective.

At an average range of 14,500 yards (13,300 m), Iowa closed with Katori and fired 46 16-inch (406 mm) high-capacity (non-armor-piercing) rounds and 124 5-inch (127 mm), straddling the cruiser with eight salvos. CAG 17/A16-3 reported Iowa hit Katori with her second salvo. Just after Iowa's fourth salvo, Katori quickly listed to port exposing seven large shell holes about 5 feet (1.5 m) in diameter in her starboard side, one under the bridge about five feet below the waterline, another amidships about at the waterline, plus about nine smaller holes. The damage on the port side was much worse. After being under attack by Iowa for about five minutes, Katori sank stern first, with a port side list at 07°45′N 151°20′E about 40 miles (64 km) northwest of Truk.

Katori was officially stricken from the Navy list on 31 March 1944.
