= Akagi Maru-class armed merchantmen =

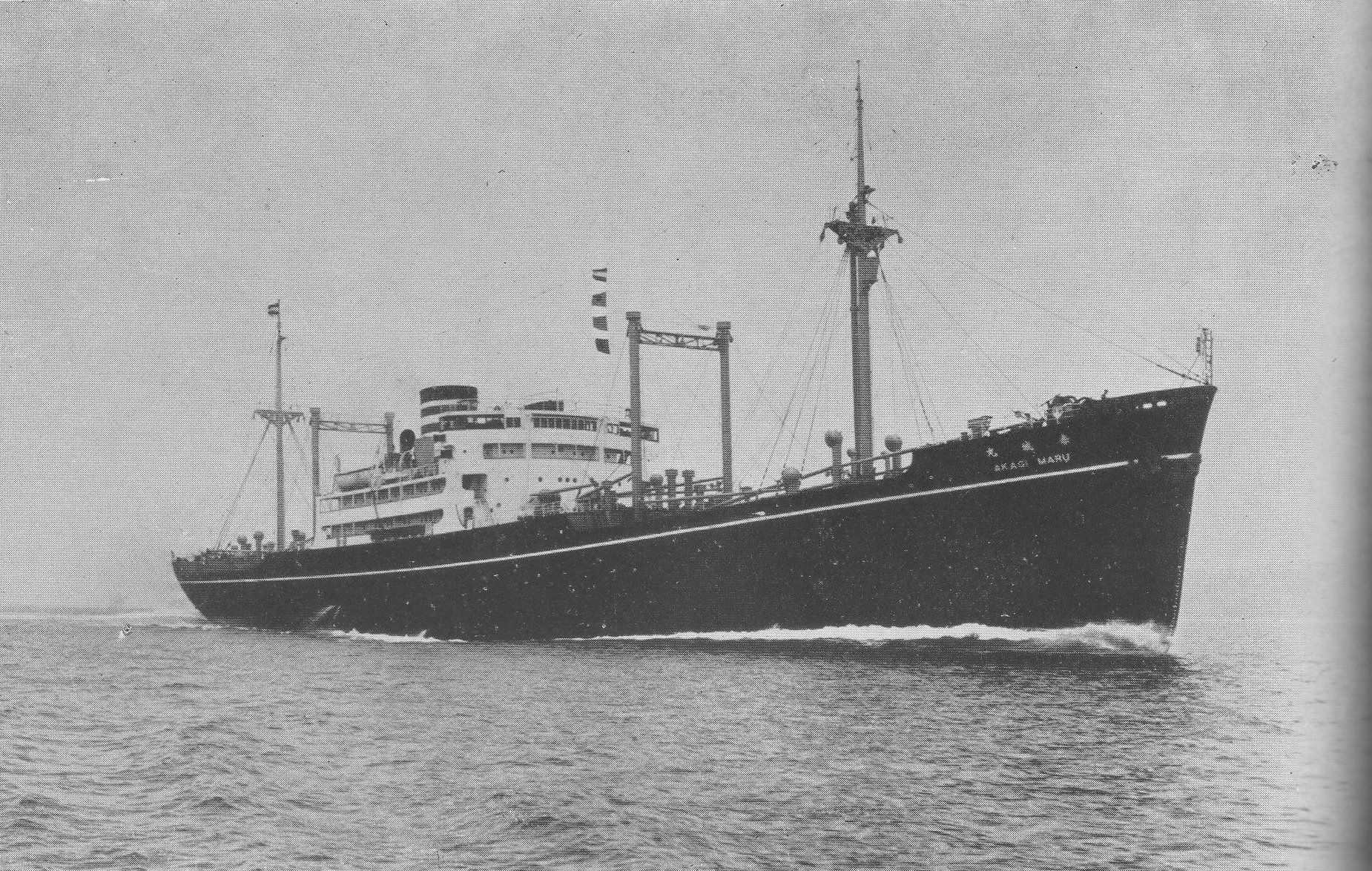
- Akagi Maru

Class overview
- Name: Akagi Maru class
- Builders: Mitsubishi Heavy Industries Nagasaki Shipyard
- Operators: Imperial Japanese Navy
- Preceded by: A-class cargo ship
- Built: 1935–1937
- In service: 1936–1944
- In commission: 1941–1944
- Completed: 3
- Lost: 3
- Retired: 0

General characteristics
- Type: Armed merchantmen
- Displacement: 7,389 tonnes (7,272 long tons)
- Length: 147.75 m (484 ft 9 in)
- Beam: 10 m (32 ft 10 in)
- Draft: 8.39 m (27 ft 6 in)
- Propulsion: 1 x Mitsubishi MS diesel engine (8771hp total power)
- Speed: 14 knots (16 mph; 26 km/h)
- Range: unknown
- Complement: 59–61
- Armament: 4 × 14 cm Type 3; 2 × 8 cm/40 3rd Year Type naval gun; 2 × 2 Type 96 25 mm AT/AA Gun; 2 × 4 13.2 mm (0.52 in) Type 92 MG; 1 × 13.2 mm (0.52 in) Type 92 MG; 2 × 7.7mm MG; 1 × 2 533 mm (21.0 in) torpedo tubes; 12 × depth charge
- Aircraft carried: 2×Aichi E13A floatplane
- Aviation facilities: 1 launch catapult

The Akagi Maru-class armed merchant cruiser (赤城丸, A-gata kamotsusen) was a class of three armed merchant cruisers of the Imperial Japanese Navy.

== Background ==
The Akagi Maru-class vessels were originally built by Mitsubishi Heavy Industries for Nippon Yusen company as A-class cargo ships. They were converted to "special transport" role in 1940, and to "auxiliary cruiser" role in 1941 (and therefore armed).

== Operational history ==
=== Akagi Maru ===
Akagi Maru was sunk by air attack 17 February 1944 in Chuuk Lagoon as a part of the Operation Hailstone.

=== Asaka Maru ===
Asaka Maru (ja:浅香丸 (特設巡洋艦)) circumnavigated the globe in January–April 1941, bringing 3,000 tons of much needed military equipment from Germany. It also helped supply the Japanese occupation of Kiska. Asaka Maru was sunk by air attack 12 October 1944 near Penghu 23.55°N 119.717°E.

=== Awata Maru ===
Awata Maru (ja:粟田丸 (特設巡洋艦)) was slightly damaged in Doolittle Raid 18 April 1942. Later, it was a primary transport for the Japanese occupation of Kiska and Japanese occupation of Attu. It was sunk 22 October 1943 near Shanghai by the submarine USS Grayback.

== See also ==
- List of ship classes of the Second World War

== Bibliography ==
- Hannig, Marcus A. (2016). "Question 8/46: Japanese WW II Armed Merchant Cruisers". Warship International. LIII (1): 30–31. ISSN 0043-0374.
