= Return to the Sea (disambiguation) =

Return to the Sea may refer to:

- Return to the Sea, a 2006 album by Islands
- Return to the Sea (TV series), an American television series that aired from 1991 to 1992 and in 1995
- The Little Mermaid II: Return to the Sea, a 2000 film
- "A Return to the Sea", a 1997 song by Nightwish
