= Akagi Maru =

Japanese cargo ship

Coordinates: 07°50′N 151°25′E

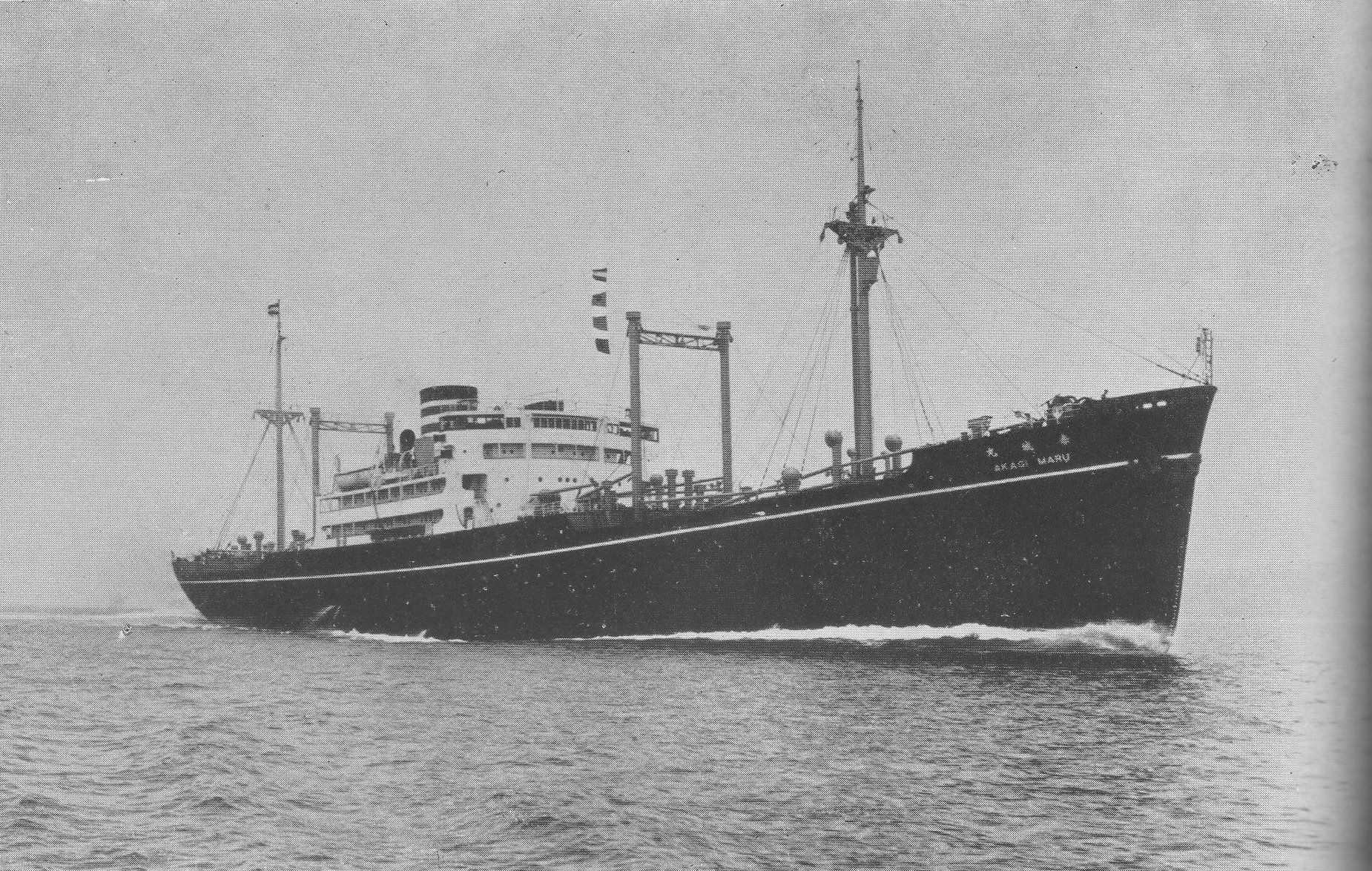
- Akagi Maru in 1937

History
- Name: Akagi Maru
- Operator: Nippon Yusen Kaisha
- Port of registry: (Empire of Japan) Tokyo
- Builder: Mitsubishi, Nagasaki
- Yard number: 627
- Laid down: 2 December 1935
- Launched: 6 June 1936
- Completed: 10 September 1936
- In service: 1936
- Out of service: November 1941
- Fate: Transferred to Imperial Japanese Navy

Empire of Japan
- Name: Akagi Maru
- Acquired: November 1941
- Commissioned: December 1941
- Fate: Sunk 18 February 1944

General characteristics As built
- Type: Passenger ship
- Tonnage: 7,387 GRT
- Length: 462 ft 8 in (141.0 m) pp
- Beam: 62 ft 3 in (19.0 m)
- Draught: 27 ft 7 in (8.4 m)
- Installed power: 1 8-cyl 2-stroke Mitsubishi Sulzer diesel engine; 8,000 hp (5,966 kW)
- Propulsion: 1 shaft
- Speed: 19 knots (35 km/h; 22 mph)

Akagi Maru was one of three Akagi Maru-class armed merchantmen of the Imperial Japanese Navy, and was launched in 1936. Akagi Maru was used initially used as a refrigerated cargo/passenger ship between ports in Japan, Europe and South America. The ship took part in World War II in the Pacific Ocean and was sunk with great loss of life by air attack on 17 February 1944 in Chuuk Lagoon as a part of the Allied Operation Hailstone.

== Description ==
Akagi Maru was initially a refrigerated cargo/passenger ship that was 462 ft 8 in (141.0 m) long between perpendiculars with a beam of 62 ft 3 in (19.0 m) and a draught of 27 ft 7 in (8.4 m). The ship was powered by an 8-cylinder, 2-stroke Mitsubishi Sulzer diesel engine rated at 8,000 horsepower (5,966 kW) driving one shaft. This gave the ship a maximum speed of 19 knots (35 km/h; 22 mph). The ship's gross register tonnage while a passenger ship was 7,387 tons. After conversion to an armed merchantman, Akagi Maru was fitted with four 152-millimetre (6 in)/50 calibre low-angle guns and light anti-aircraft guns.

== Construction and early service ==
Akagi Maru was built in 1936 at Mitsubishi's shipyard in Nagasaki with the yard number 627 for the Nippon Yusen Kaisha (NYK). The ship's keel was laid down on 2 December 1935 and was launched and named on 6 June 1936. The ship was registered in Tokyo. After completion on 10 September, Akagi Maru sailed for NYK between Japan, Europe and South America until it was requisitioned by the Imperial Japanese Navy in November 1941 and converted to an auxiliary cruiser.

== Naval history ==
The armed merchant cruiser returned to service in December 1941 following her conversion. Akagi Maru then performed patrol missions in northern waters for most of 1942, operating mainly from Kushiro and Yokosuka. During this period, Akagi Maru took part in the searches for the lost picket boats Eikichi Maru and Ebisu Maru No. 5. Both were found and returned to port, with the latter having been shelled by the United States Navy submarine USS Silversides.

Beginning on 10 March 1943, Akagi Maru began a troop transport mission, carrying the Fifth Independent Mixed Regiment. Following the transport mission, the armed merchantman returned to patrol duty operating out of Yokosuka. In December, Akagi Maru performed its second trooping mission, carrying units to Wake Island. The following month on 15 January 1944, Akagi Maru sailed for Wake Island again, but the convoy was intercepted by the submarine USS Sturgeon. The submarine fired four torpedoes at the convoy, with two of them striking the escorting destroyer Suzutsuki. Following the attack, Akagi Maru was directed to return to Japan.

== Sinking ==
On 25 January 1944 she departed Tateyama for Truk as a troop transport, which arrived there on 1 February 1944. In the morning of 18 February 1944, Akagi Maru departed Truk for Yokosuka, with 617 passengers in convoy 4215. She was escorted by the light cruiser Katori, destroyers Maikaze and Nowaki, and minesweeping trawler Shonan Maru No. 15. Half an hour later, the convoy came under a massive attack from Grumman F6F Hellcat fighters and Grumman TBF Avenger torpedo bombers from the United States aircraft carriers Yorktown, Intrepid, Essex, Bunker Hill and Cowpens.

At 0730, a 500 lb (227 kg) bomb hit her forward hold No. 2 and caused heavy damage. At 0910, she took a direct hit by another 500 lb bomb in her starboard hold No. 5. The bomb ignited fuel in nearby tanks and a large fire broke out. At 0955, Akagi Maru took a third hit by a bomb in her port No. 5 hold, which made the ship stop and caused several large explosions. At 1030, Abandon Ship was ordered, and survivors were taken aboard Katori but perished later in the morning with her. Akagi Maru sank at 1047 at position 07-50N, 151-25E in the vicinity of the North Pass. A total of 512 passengers and 788 sailors were lost.
