= Japanese destroyer Maikaze =

Kagerō-class destroyer

Coordinates: 07°45′N 151°20′E

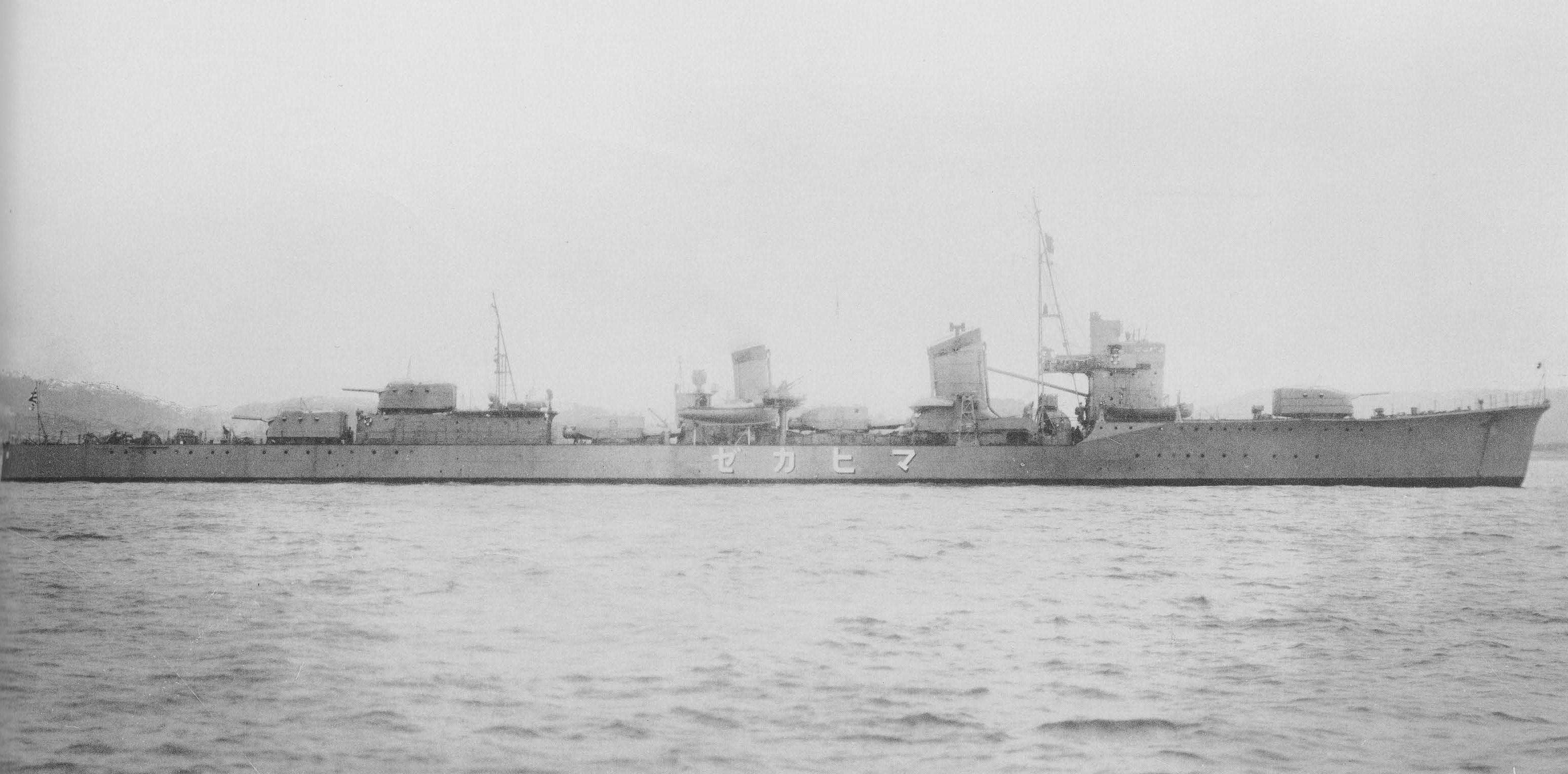
- Maikaze upon commissioning on 15 July 1941

History

Empire of Japan
- Name: Maikaze
- Ordered: 1939
- Builder: Fujinagata Shipyards
- Laid down: 22 April 1940
- Launched: 15 March 1941
- Commissioned: 15 July 1941
- Stricken: 31 March 1944
- Fate: Sunk in action by USS New Jersey, USS Minneapolis, and USS New Orleans, 17 February 1944

General characteristics
- Class & type: Kagerō-class destroyer
- Displacement: 2,490 long tons (2,530 t)
- Length: 118.5 m (388 ft 9 in)
- Beam: 10.8 m (35 ft 5 in)
- Draft: 3.8 m (12 ft 6 in)
- Speed: 35.5 knots (40.9 mph; 65.7 km/h)
- Complement: 239
- Armament: 6 × 127 mm (5.0 in)/50 caliber DP guns; up to 28 × Type 96 25 mm (0.98 in) AA guns; up to 4 × 13.2 mm (0.52 in) AA guns; 8 × 610 mm (24 in) torpedo tubes; 36 depth charges

Maikaze (舞風, "Dancing Wind") was one of 19 Kagerō-class destroyers built for the Imperial Japanese Navy during the 1930s

== Design and description ==
The Kagerō class was an enlarged and improved version of the preceding Asashio class. Their crew numbered 240 officers and enlisted men. The ships measured 118.5 meters (388 ft 9 in) overall, with a beam of 10.8 meters (35 ft 5 in) and a draft of 3.76 meters (12 ft 4 in). They displaced 2,065 metric tons (2,032 long tons) at standard load and 2,529 metric tons (2,489 long tons) at deep load. The ships had two Kampon geared steam turbines, each driving one propeller shaft, using steam provided by three Kampon water-tube boilers. The turbines were rated at a total of 52,000 shaft horsepower (39,000 kW) for a designed speed of 35.5 knots (65.7 km/h; 40.9 mph). The ships had a range of 5,000 nautical miles (9,300 km; 5,800 mi) at a speed of 18 knots (33 km/h; 21 mph).

The main armament of the Kagerō class consisted of six Type 3 127-millimeter (5.0 in) guns in three twin-gun turrets, one superfiring pair aft and one turret forward of the superstructure. They were built with four Type 96 25-millimeter (1.0 in) anti-aircraft guns in two twin-gun mounts, but more of these guns were added over the course of the war. The ships were also armed with eight 610-millimeter (24.0 in) torpedo tubes for the oxygen-fueled Type 93 "Long Lance" torpedo in two quadruple traversing mounts; one reload was carried for each tube. Their anti-submarine weapons comprised 16 depth charges.

== Construction and career ==
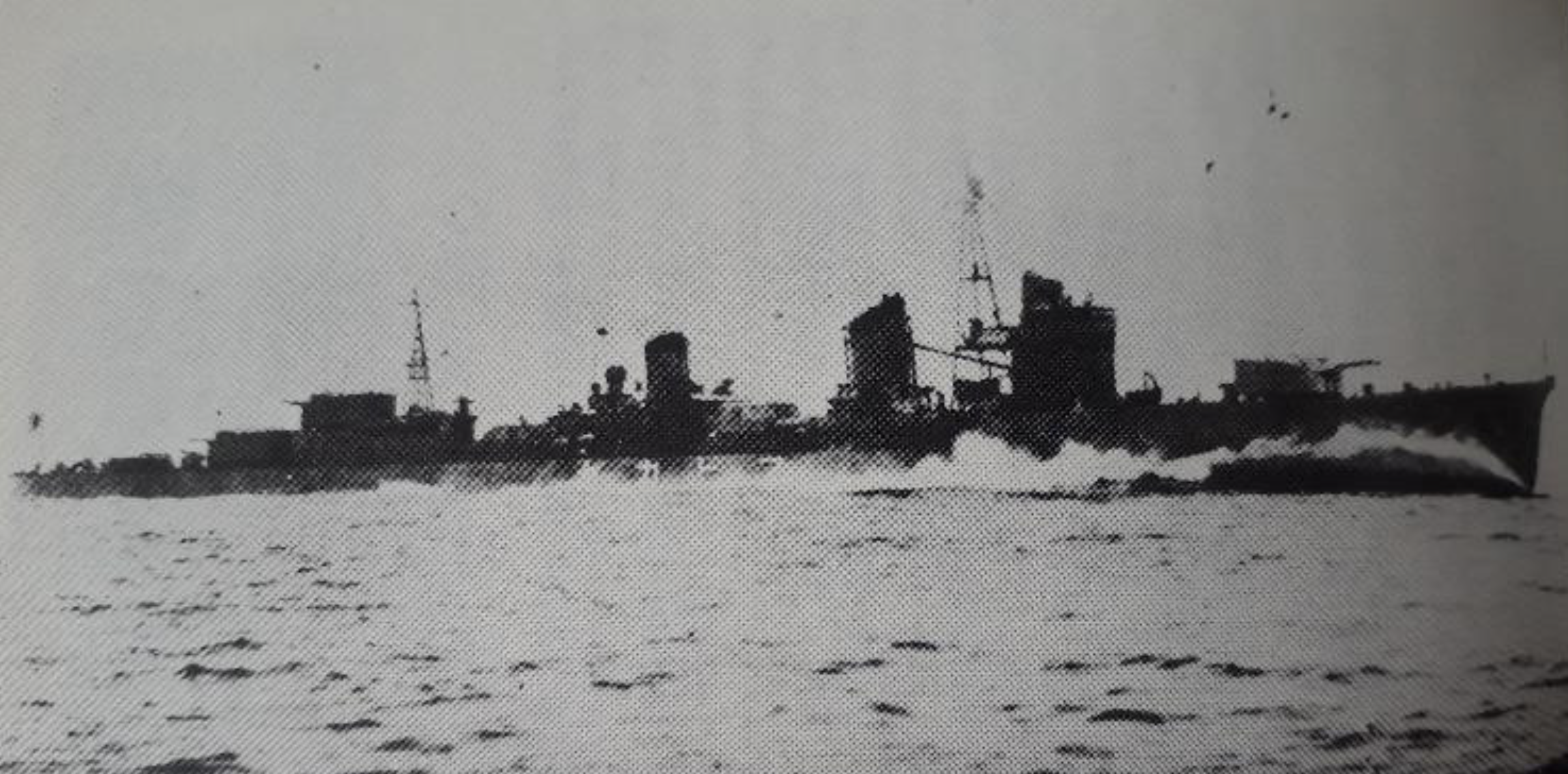
Maikaze undergoing sea trials off Fujinagata, July 1941

Maikaze was laid down in the Fujinagata shipyards on 22 April 1940, launched on 15 March 1941, and completed on 15 July 1941. Upon commissioning, Maikaze was assigned to training duty before she and her sistership Nowaki were delegated as guard ships on 1 September, and on 31 October, Maikaze was assigned to destroyer division 4 (Arashi, Nowaki, Maikaze, Hagikaze) of destroyer squadron 4. Maikaze partook in patrol duty and transited between ports in the months leading up to the Pacific War, and on 4 December 1941 joined the rest of destroyer division 4 in escorting Admiral Kondō's naval fleet out of Mako as a cover force for the Japanese invasion of the Philippines and Malaysia, where Maikaze was tasked with escorting invasion convoys to Malaysia until 11 January 1942. Maikaze then escorted the fleet to Palau from 14 to 18 January, then escorted troop convoys to the Dutch East Indies until 15 February, before destroyer division 4 escorted the fleet to Staring Bay from 18 to 21 February. While Arashi and Nowaki took part in the Battle of Tjilatjap and sank or captured 15 ships between them, Maikaze and Hagikaze serves as escorts for carrier operations in the Java Sea from 25 February to 11 March without seeing action themselves. On 27 March, Maikaze and Hagikaze departed as escorts to the supply group for the Japanese aircraft carriers during the Indian Ocean Raid. On 5 April, Japanese carrier aircraft raided Colombo and sank several ships in the harbor before later sinking the heavy cruisers HMS Cornwall and HMS Dorsetshire, then on the 9th raided Trincomale before they sank the light carrier HMS Hermes and others, earning a Japanese victory. On 14 April, Maikaze and Hagikaze began to escort the carrier fleet back to Japan, but on the 18th split to escort the detached Shōkaku and Zuikaku to Mako before rejoining the fleet. Maikaze finally returned to Japan on the 22nd where she was dry-docked for maintenance in Yokosuka.

In the lead up to Operation AL, destroyer division 4 was reassigned to the 10th destroyer squadron, and on 17 May departed Hashirajima to escort the aircraft carriers Akagi, Kaga, Sōryū, and Hiryū in what became the battle of Midway. During the action, Maikaze served as Sōryū's plane guard, and after an after the air strikes on Midway Island went according to plan, the presence of American aircraft carriers were made apparent. The initial waves of aircraft were repelled, but a 5 minute attack by dive bombers from USS Enterprise and USS Yorktown hit Akagi, Kaga, and Sōryū and set all three carriers ablaze. Maikaze rescued survivors from Kaga but was forced to break away early to avoid explosions and debris from the mangled carrier. Maikaze then attempted to assist in scuttling Akagi, but her torpedo tubes failed to fire. In the meantime, Hiryū crippled Yorktown but was herself fatally wounded by dive bombers from Enterprise and scuttled. In the following days, Yorktown and the destroyer USS Hammann were torpedoed and sunk by the Japanese submarine I-168, while planes from Enterprise and USS Hornet sank the heavy cruiser Mikuma, ending the battle of Midway in a crippling American victory as Maikaze transferred survivors to the battleships Nagato and Mutsu.

Maikaze embarked on troop and supply transport missions throughout the Guadalcanal campaign, and on August 24 Maikaze escorted aircraft carriers during the battle of the Eastern Solomons, and on October 26 escorted carriers during the battle of Santa Cruz, and from December 13-18, she towed her crippled sistership Nowaki to Truk.

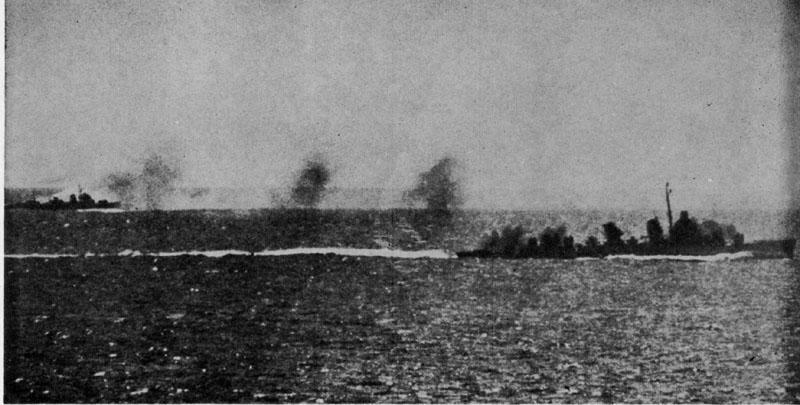
The destroyer USS Bradford firing on the crippled Maikaze during Operation hailstone, 18 February 1944

With the start of 1943, Maikaze surviving a bombing raid during convoy escorting that sank the troop ships Nichiryu Maru and Myoko Maru on 7 January 1943 and rescued survivors. Three days later while escorting the remaining convoys, Maikaze located the submarine USS Argonaut attempting to intercept and sink the Japanese troop ships. Alongside her sistership Isokaze, Maikaze furiously depth charged the area, forcing Argonaut to surface. Maikaze and Isokaze then opened fire and blasted Argonaut until a sinking was confirmed, with all 102 hands going down with the ship. Maikaze evacuated Japanese troops from Guadalcanal during Operation Ke, where she was damaged by American aircraft and escorted to repairs, and throughout the rest of 1943, Maikaze saw convoy escorting duties between Truk and various Japanese occupied islands.

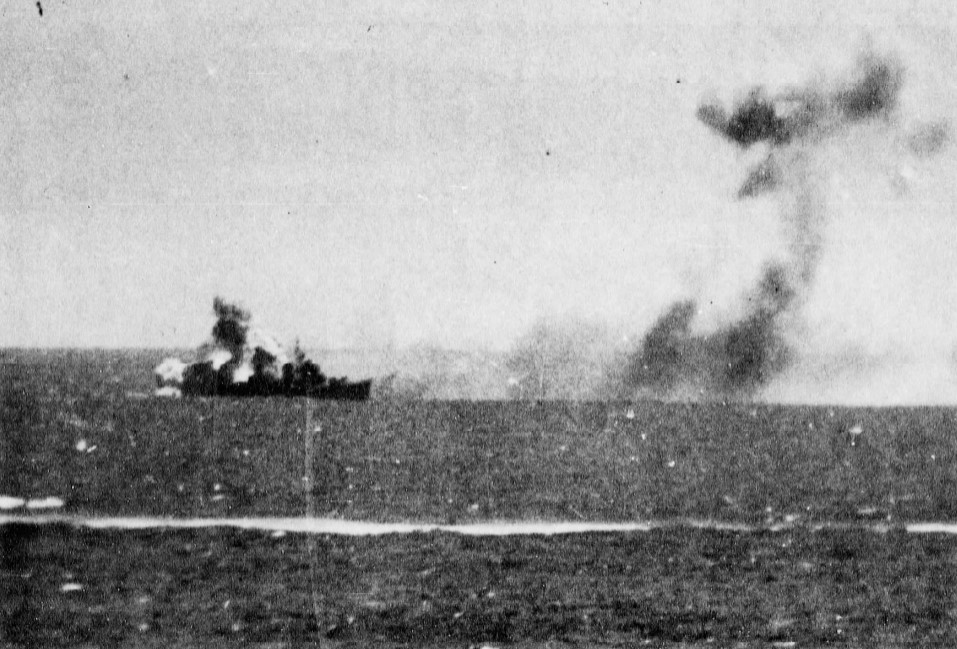
Maikaze's magazines detonating, taken from USS New Jersey

On 17 February 1944, while evacuating convoys to Yokosuka from Truk following the Allied attack on Truk, Maikaze, Nowaki, the training cruiser Katori, the armed merchant cruiser Akagi Maru, and the armed trawler Shonan Maru were intercepted by American aircraft. USS Enterprise Helldivers hit Maikaze with a reported 3 bomb hits, leaving the destroyer dead in the water, before more aircraft sank Akagi Maru and crippled Katori. Nowaki took Maikaze under tow as - rather than more aircraft finishing her off - US surface forces located them, consisting of the American battleships USS Iowa and USS New Jersey, supported by the heavy cruisers USS New Orleans and USS Minneapolis and a number of destroyers. Maikaze responded with a full spread of torpedoes, which almost hit New Jersey, but in turn was blasted by the 8-inch (203 mm) guns of New Orleans and Minneapolis and New Jersey's 5-inch (127 mm) secondary batteries and the destroyer USS Bradford, reduced to a flaming hulk and sinking with all hands after her magazines exploded, including Commander Destroyer Division 4 (Captain Kenma Isohisa). Simultaneously, Iowa finished off Katori with at least seven 16-inch (406 mm) and nine 5-inch (127 mm) shell hits, while Maikaze's killers turned their attention and sank Shonan Maru. Nowaki managed to escape, but not before being straddled by Iowa several times.
