= Fujikawa Maru =

Japanese armed transport ship sunk in Truk lagoon

Coordinates: 7°20′48″N 151°53′24″E

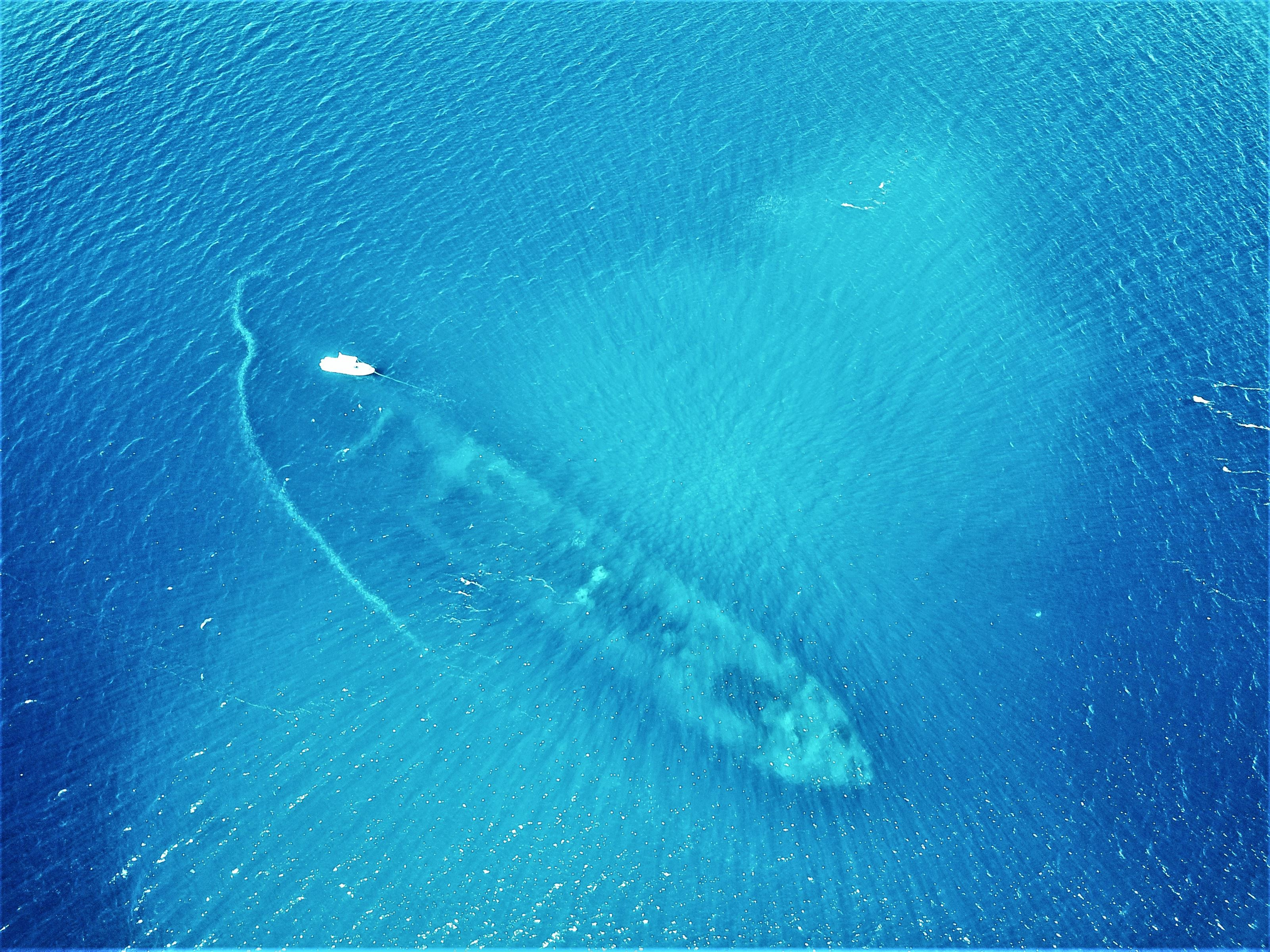
- The Fujikawa Maru

History

Japan
- Name: Fujikawa Maru
- Owner: Toyo Kaiun K.K., Tokyo
- Operator: Imperial Japanese Navy
- Builder: Mitsubishi Zosensho, Nagasaki
- Laid down: 20 October 1937
- Launched: 15 April 1938
- Completed: 1 July 1938
- Commissioned: requisitioned 9 December 1940
- Out of service: 17 February 1944
- Stricken: 1944
- Home port: Tokyo
- Identification: Official number: 45067
- Fate: Sunk by torpedo attack 17 February 1944

General characteristics
- Type: Transport
- Displacement: 6,938 long tons (7,049 t)
- Length: 437.4 ft (133.3 m)
- Beam: 58.5 ft (17.8 m)
- Draught: 26 ft (7.9 m)
- Speed: 13.5 knots (25.0 km/h; 15.5 mph)
- Range: 5,000 nmi (9,300 km; 5,800 mi) at 13.5 knots (25.0 km/h; 15.5 mph)
- Complement: 162

Service record
- Operations: Battle of Midway, Operation Hailstone

Fujikawa Maru was a refrigerated cargo ship that was built in 1938 for the Toyo Kaiun Kisen Kaisha. She was requisitioned by the Imperial Japanese Navy during World War II for use as an auxiliary armed aircraft transport or ferry, and was rerated as an auxiliary transport on 1 January, 1944. She was sunk in Truk Lagoon in 1944 during Operation Hailstone and is now a leading wreck diving site for scuba divers.

== History ==
Fujikawa Maru was requisitioned in 1940 by the Imperial Japanese Navy, and was based in Indo-China under the command of the 11th Fleet. She saw service in the Battle of Midway as part of AiRon 7. On 12 September 1943 she was hit by a torpedo fired by the United States submarine Permit, and returned to Japan for repairs. Subsequently on 5 December 1943 she was hit by torpedo bombers from the aircraft carrier USS Yorktown suffering minor damage. From thence she was taken to Truk Lagoon (now Chuuk Lagoon) to undergo repairs.

On 17–18 February 1944 she was hit repeatedly by US bombers and torpedo bombers as part of Operation Hailstone, before she finally sank on 18 February at approximately 7:15am.

== Dive site ==
Fujikawa Maru is regarded as the best scuba diving site in Chuuk Lagoon by both of the principal authors who have undertaken comprehensive surveys of the lagoon, Dan E. Bailey and Klaus Lindemann.

Amongst the more striking features on the wreck are at least nine disassembled Mitsubishi fighter aircraft in one of the forward holds. Eight of the aircraft are A6M Zeros and the ninth is an A5M Claude, the sole known survivor of the type. The vessel also boasts a 6-inch (152 mm) bow gun, left over from the Sino-Japanese war and retrofitted.

The Times named it as one of the top 10 wreck dives in the world, and Aquaviews ranked it as the fourth best wreck dive in the world.

== In media ==
- "Graveyard of the Atlantic...Graveyard of the Pacific," a 1991 episode of the PBS television series Return to the Sea, includes footage of a dive on the wreck of Fujikawa Maru.
