= Japanese destroyer Fumizuki (1926) =

Mutsuki-class destroyer of the Imperial Japanese Navy sunk at Truk

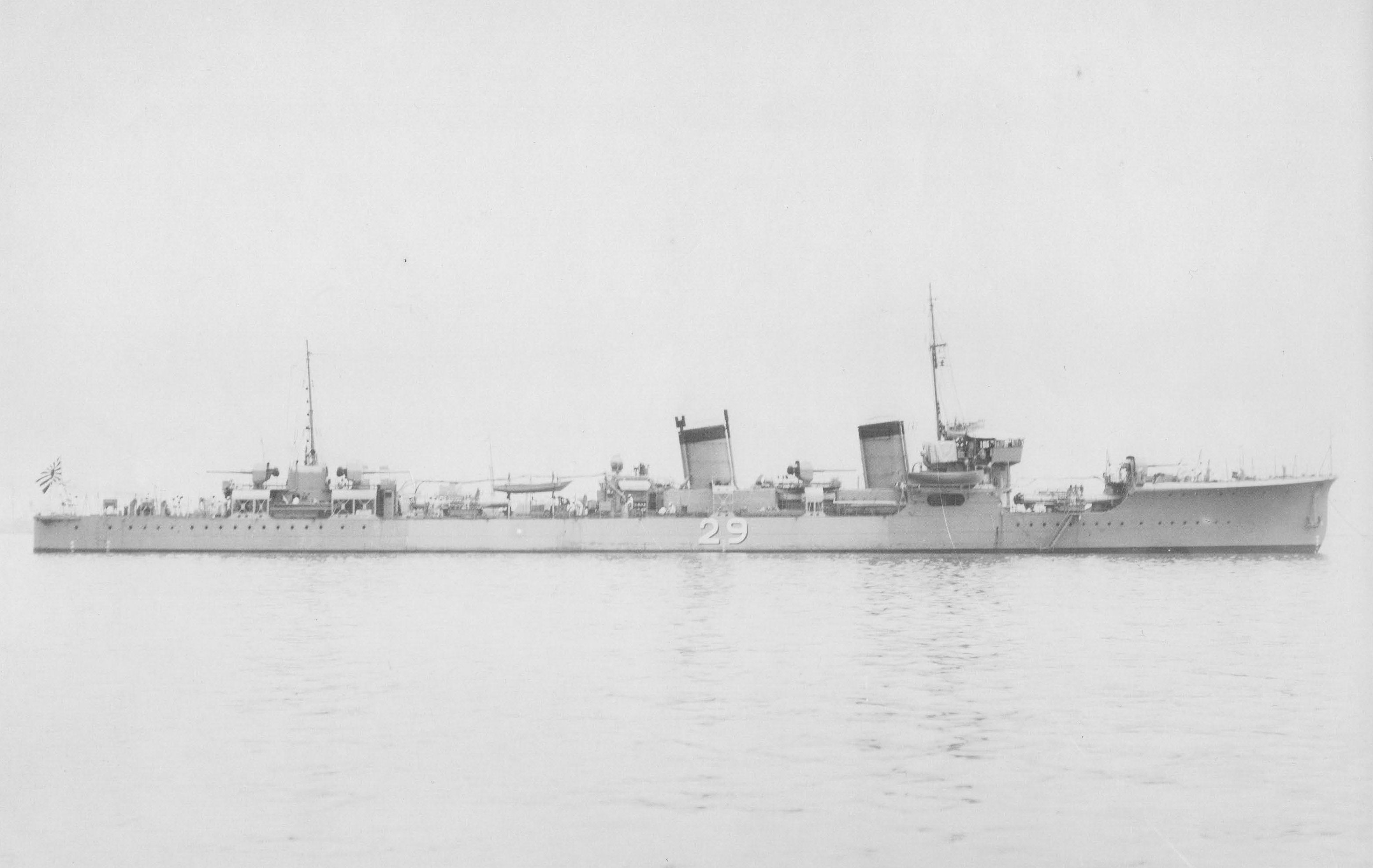
- Fumizuki in July 1926

History

Empire of Japan
- Name: Fumizuki
- Namesake: July
- Builder: Fujinagata Shipyards, Osaka
- Laid down: 20 October 1924 as Destroyer No. 29
- Launched: 16 February 1926
- Completed: 3 July 1926
- Renamed: As Fumizuki, 1 August 1928
- Stricken: 31 March 1944
- Fate: Sunk by American aircraft, 18 February 1944

General characteristics
- Class & type: Mutsuki-class destroyer
- Displacement: 1,336 t (1,315 long tons) (normal); 1,800 t (1,772 long tons) (deep load)
- Length: 97.54 m (320 ft 0 in) (pp); 102.4 m (335 ft 11 in) (o/a)
- Beam: 9.16 m (30 ft 1 in)
- Draft: 2.96 m (9 ft 9 in)
- Installed power: 38,500 shp (28,700 kW); 4 × Kampon water-tube boilers
- Propulsion: 2 shafts; 2 × Kampon geared steam turbines
- Speed: 37.25 knots (68.99 km/h; 42.87 mph)
- Range: 4,000 nmi (7,400 km; 4,600 mi) at 15 knots (28 km/h; 17 mph)
- Complement: 150
- Armament: 4 × 12 cm (4.7 in) Type 3 guns; 2 × triple 61 cm (24 in) torpedo tubes; 18 × depth charges; 16 × mines

Service record
- Part of: Destroyer Division 30
- Operations: Battle of the Philippines; Battle of Java; Solomon Islands campaign; New Guinea campaign; Operation Hailstorm

Fumizuki (文月, ”July”) was one of twelve Mutsuki-class destroyers, built for the Imperial Japanese Navy (IJN) during the 1920s. During the Pacific War, she participated in the Philippines Campaign in December 1941 and the Dutch East Indies Campaign in early 1942. In March, she was assigned to convoy escort duties in and around Malaya and the Dutch East Indies until she was transferred to Rabaul in early 1943 to ferry troops around New Guinea and the Solomon Islands.

== Design and description ==
The Mutsuki class was an improved version of the Kamikaze-class destroyers and was the first with triple 61-centimeter (24 in) torpedo tubes. The ships had an overall length of 102.4 meters (335 ft 11 in) and were 94.54 meters (310 ft 2 in) between perpendiculars. They had a beam of 9.16 meters (30 ft 1 in), and a mean draft of 2.96 meters (9 ft 9 in). The Mutsuki-class ships displaced 1,336 metric tons (1,315 long tons) at standard load and 1,800 metric tons (1,772 long tons) at deep load. They were powered by two Parsons geared steam turbines, each driving one propeller shaft, using steam provided by four Kampon water-tube boilers. The turbines were designed to produce 38,500 shaft horsepower (28,700 kW), which would propel the ships at 37.25 knots (68.99 km/h; 42.87 mph). The ships carried 420 metric tons (413 long tons) of fuel oil which gave them a range of 4,000 nautical miles (7,400 km; 4,600 mi) at 15 knots (28 km/h; 17 mph). Their crew consisted of 150 officers and crewmen.

The main armament of the Mutsuki-class ships consisted of four 12-centimeter (4.7 in) Type 3 guns in single mounts; one gun forward of the superstructure, one between the two funnels and the last pair back to back atop the aft superstructure. The guns were numbered '1' to '4' from front to rear. The ships carried two above-water triple sets of 61-centimeter torpedo tubes; one mount was between the forward superstructure and the forward gun and the other was between the aft funnel and aft superstructure. Four reload torpedoes were provided for the tubes. They carried 18 depth charges and could also carry 16 mines. They could also fitted with minesweeping gear.

Fumizuki was one of six Mutsuki-class ships reconstructed in 1935–36, with their hulls strengthened, raked caps fitted to the funnels and shields to the torpedo mounts. In 1941–42, most of those ships were converted into fast transports with No. 2 and No. 3 guns removed. In addition, ten license-built 25 mm (1.0 in) Type 96 light AA guns and at least two 13.2 mm (0.5 in) Type 93 anti-aircraft machineguns were installed. The minesweeping gear was replaced by four depth charge throwers and the ships now carried a total of 36 depth charges. These changes reduced their speed to 34 knots (63 km/h; 39 mph) and increased their displacement to 1,944 metric tons (1,913 long tons) at normal load. Three more 25 mm guns were added in 1942–43.

== Construction and career ==
Fumizuki, built at the Fujinagata Shipyards in Osaka, was laid down on 20 October 1924, launched on 16 February 1926 and completed on 3 July 1926. Originally commissioned as Destroyer No. 29, the ship was assigned the name Fumizuki on 1 August 1928.

=== Pacific War ===
At the time of the attack on Pearl Harbor on 7 December 1941, Minazuki was assigned to Destroyer Division 22 under Destroyer Squadron 5 of the 3rd Fleet. She sortied from the Mako Guard District in the Pescadores as part of the Japanese invasion force for Operation M (the invasion of the Philippines), during which time the destroyer helped screen landings of Japanese forces at Lingayen Gulf and at Aparri.

In early 1942, Fumizuki was assigned to escorting troop convoys from French Indochina for Operation E (the invasion of Malaya) and Operation J (the invasion of Java, Netherlands East Indies), in February. From 10 March 1942 Fumizuki and Destroyer Division 5 were reassigned to the Southwest Area Fleet and escorted troop convoy from Singapore to Penang, and Rangoon. She returned to Sasebo Naval Arsenal for repairs on 17 June, and returned to Mako in early September.

On 16 September, Fumizuki sustained heavy damage after a collision with the transport Kachidoki Maru in Formosa Strait, forcing a return to Sasebo for repairs until early 1943.

At the end of January 1943, Fumizuki escorted the seaplane tender Kamikawa Maru from Sasebo via Truk and Rabaul to Shortlands, and remained throughout February to cover Operation KE (troop evacuations from Guadalcanal). On 25 February, Fumizuki was reassigned to the IJN 8th Fleet. The destroyer participated in several Tokyo Express troop transport missions throughout the Solomon Islands through the end of April, suffering damage from strafing attacks at Finschhafen in March and at Kavieng in April.

Fumizuki returned to Yokosuka Naval Arsenal for repairs on 4 May. The ship departed Yokosuka on August 20 escorting convoys via Sasebo to Saipan, Truk and Rabaul. From September through January 1944, the destroyer made numerous “Tokyo Express” runs to evacuate troops from Kolombangara and Vella Lavella and to land troops at Buka, Bougainville and various areas in New Guinea. On 2 November, Fumizuki was strafed during an air raid by United States Navy aircraft while at Rabaul, with six crewmen killed and four injured. The vessel was again damaged in an air raid near Kavieng on the night of 4 January 1944.

While at Truk on 17 February 1944, Fumizuki received a near miss bomb from a Grumman TBF Avengers during Operation Hailstone, when carrier-based US Navy aircraft attacked the Imperial Japanese Navy fleet anchorage. The near miss to port amidships disabled her only usable turbine and caused gradual flooding, which the crew could not control, and Fumizuki sank on 18 February at 07°24′N 151°44′E, with 29 crewmen killed. Fumizuki was struck from the Navy List on 31 March 1944.

== In media ==
- "Graveyard of the Atlantic...Graveyard of the Pacific," a 1991 episode of the PBS television series Return to the Sea, includes footage of a dive on the wreck of Fumizuki.
