= USS Minneapolis (CA-36) =

New Orleans class heavy cruiser

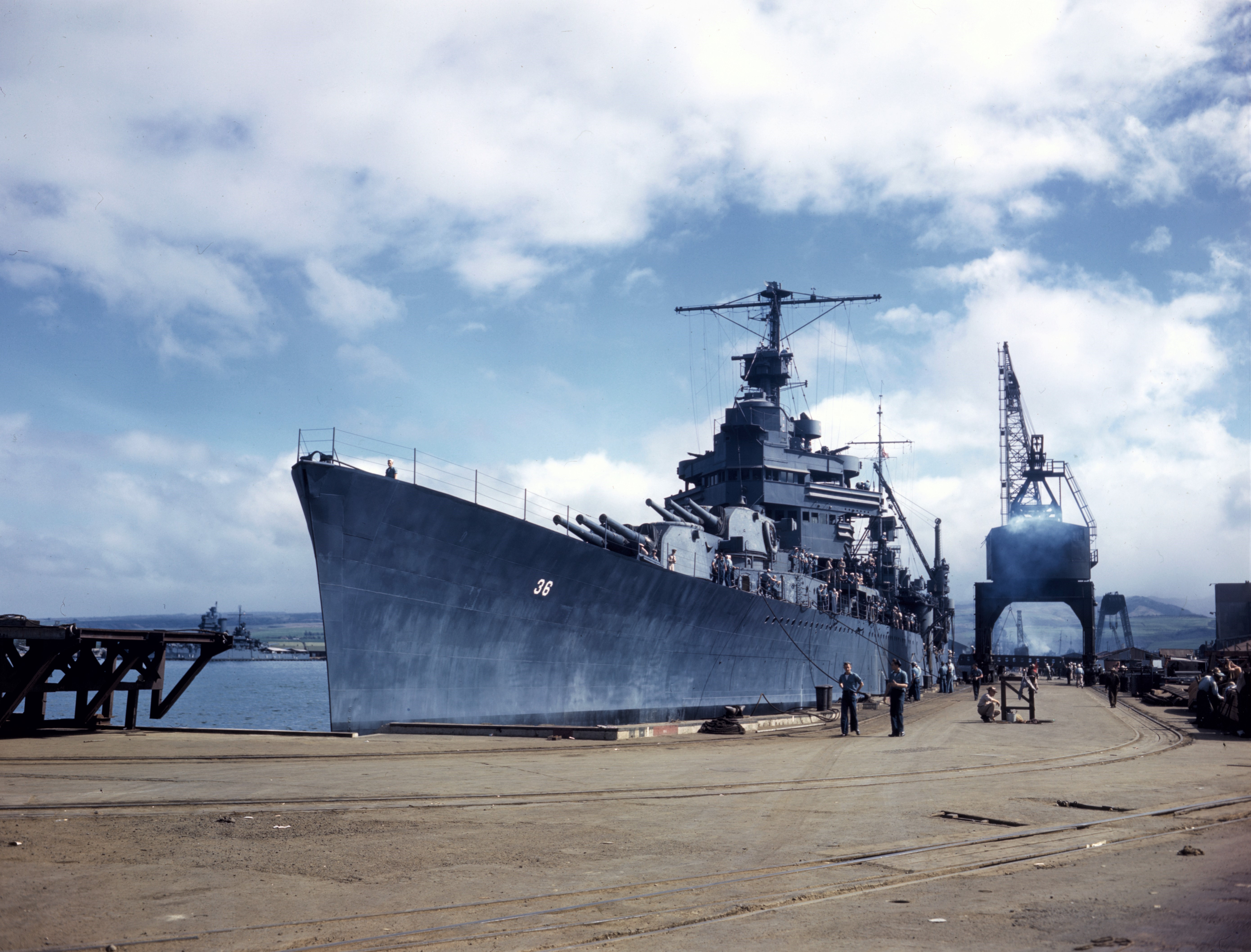
- USS Minneapolis (CA-36) at Pearl Harbor Naval Shipyard on 11 April 1943

History

United States
- Name: Minneapolis
- Namesake: City of Minneapolis, Minnesota
- Ordered: 13 February 1929
- Awarded: 12 July 1929 (date assigned to ship yard); 2 June 1930 (beginning of construction period)
- Builder: Philadelphia Naval Shipyard, Philadelphia, Pennsylvania
- Cost: $11,951,000 (limit of price)
- Laid down: 27 June 1931
- Launched: 6 September 1933
- Sponsored by: Miss Grace L. Newton
- Commissioned: 19 May 1934
- Decommissioned: 10 February 1947
- Reclassified: CA-36, 1 July 1931
- Stricken: 1 March 1959
- Identification: Hull symbol: CL-36; Hull symbol: CA-36; Code letters: NACF
- Nickname(s): "Minnie"
- Honors and awards: 17 × battle stars
- Fate: Scrapped in Chester, Pennsylvania, July 1960

General characteristics (as built)
- Class & type: New Orleans-class cruiser
- Displacement: 9,950 long tons (10,110 t) (standard)
- Length: 588 ft (179 m) oa; 574 ft (175 m) pp
- Beam: 61 ft 9 in (18.82 m)
- Draft: 19 ft 5 in (5.92 m) (mean); 23 ft 6 in (7.16 m) (max)
- Installed power: 8 × Babcock & Wilcox boilers; 107,000 shp (80,000 kW)
- Propulsion: 4 × Westinghouse geared turbines; 4 × screws
- Speed: 32.7 kn (37.6 mph; 60.6 km/h)
- Capacity: Fuel oil: 1,650 tons
- Complement: 102 officers 817 enlisted
- Armament: 9 × 8 in (200 mm)/55 caliber guns (3x3); 8 × 5 in (130 mm)/25 caliber anti-aircraft guns; 2 × 3-pounder 47 mm (1.9 in) saluting guns; 8 × caliber 0.50 in (13 mm) machine guns
- Armor: Belt: 3–5 in (76–127 mm); Deck: 1 1/4–2 1/4 in (32–57 mm); Barbettes: 5 in (130 mm); Turrets: 1 1/2–8 in (38–203 mm); Conning Tower: 5 in (130 mm)
- Aircraft carried: 4 × floatplanes
- Aviation facilities: 2 × Amidship catapults

General characteristics (1945)
- Armament: 9 × 8 in (200 mm)/55 caliber guns (3x3); 8 × 5 in (130 mm)/25 caliber anti-aircraft guns; 2 × 3-pounder 47 mm (1.9 in) saluting guns; 7 × quad 40 mm (1.6 in) Bofors anti-aircraft guns; 9 × dual 20 mm (0.79 in) Oerlikon anti-aircraft cannons
- Aviation facilities: 1 × Amidship catapults

USS Minneapolis (CL/CA-36) was a New Orleans-class cruiser built for the United States Navy before the outbreak of World War II, the second ship named for Minneapolis, Minnesota. She served in the Pacific Theater during World War II.

== Construction ==
The New Orleans-class cruisers were the last U.S. cruisers built to the specifications and standards of the Washington Naval Treaty of 1922. Such ships, with a limit of 10,000 tons standard displacement and 8-inch calibre main guns may be referred to as "treaty cruisers." Originally classified a light cruiser, because of her thin armor, she was reclassified, soon after being laid down, a heavy cruiser, because of her 8-inch guns. The term "heavy cruiser" was not defined until the London Naval Treaty in 1930.

She was laid down on 27 June 1931 by Philadelphia Navy Yard; launched on 6 September 1933; sponsored by Miss Grace L. Newton; and commissioned on 19 May 1934, Captain Gordon W. Haines in command.

== Inter-war period ==
After shakedown in European waters from July–September 1934 and alterations in Philadelphia Navy Yard, the new heavy cruiser departed on 4 April 1935 for the Panama Canal and San Diego, arriving on 18 April to join Cruiser Division 7 (CruDiv 7), Scouting Force. She operated along the west coast, aside from a cruise to the Caribbean early in 1939, until arriving at Pearl Harbor in 1940.

== World War II ==
When Japan attacked Pearl Harbor, where she was currently based, on 7 December 1941, Minneapolis was at sea for gunnery practice about 8 mi (13 km) from Pearl Harbor. She immediately took up patrol until late January 1942 when she joined a carrier task force about to raid the Gilberts and Marshalls. While screening Lexington on 1 February, she helped turn back an air attack in which three Japanese Mitsubishi G4M "Betty" medium bombers were shot down. She screened the carriers during their successful raids on 20 February and again on 10 March, when they attacked Japanese shipping at Lae and Salamaua, disrupting enemy supply lines to those garrisons.

=== Battle of the Coral Sea ===
Minneapolis took part in the Battle of the Coral Sea from 4–8 May 1942, screening Lexington through the great air engagement and shooting down three Japanese bombers. She rescued survivors when Lexington was lost, part of the price for preserving the vital lines of communication to Australia and New Zealand and stopping further Japanese expansion southward.

=== Battle of Midway ===
The cruiser was also engaged in the second key battle of the early phase of the Pacific War, the Battle of Midway from 3–6 June 1942, again protecting the carrier's task force from Japanese air attack.

=== Battle of Tassafaronga ===
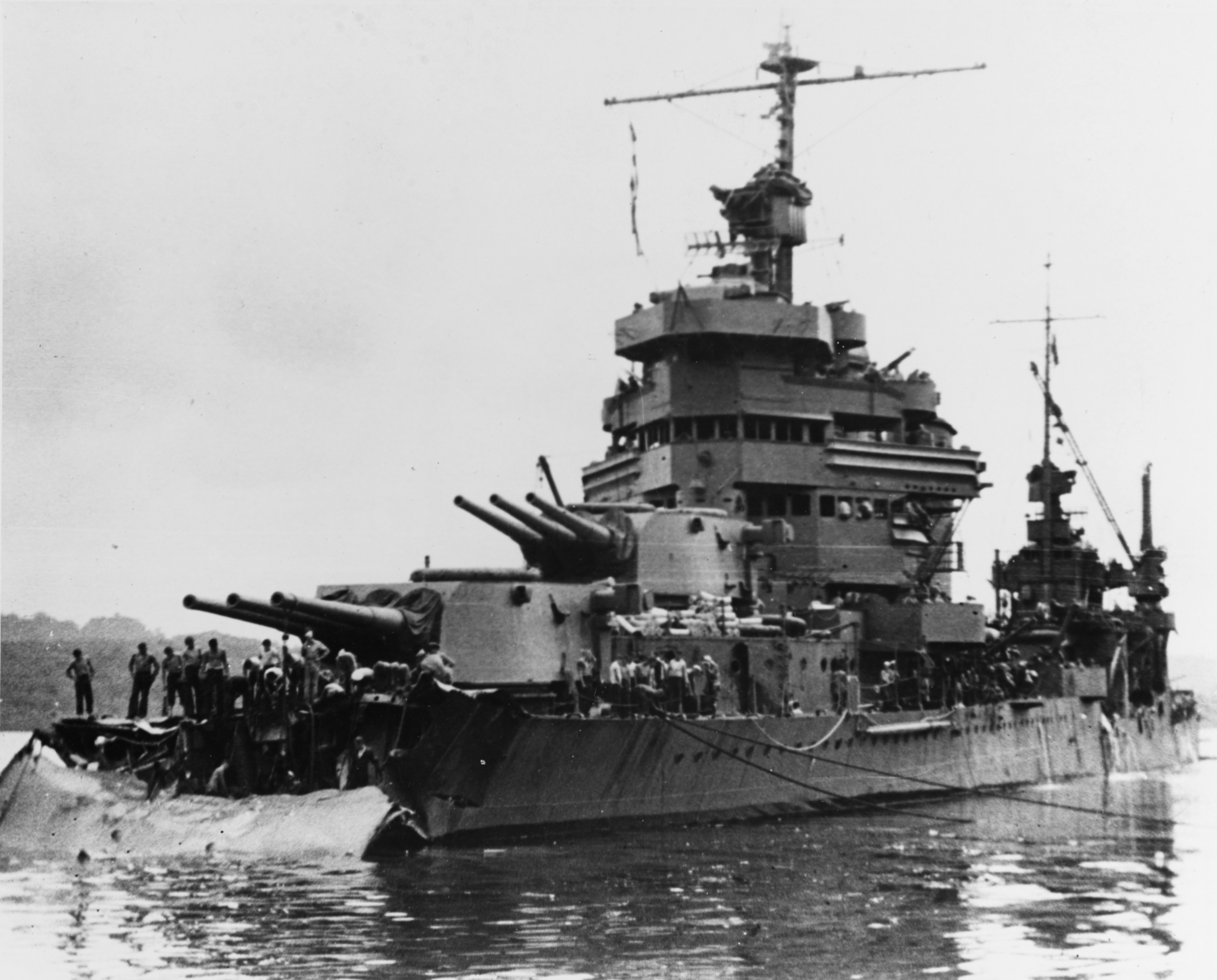
Minneapolis in December 1942, showing damage received in the Battle of Tassafaronga

After replenishing and repairing at Pearl Harbor, Minneapolis sailed to protect the carriers as they covered the landings on Guadalcanal and Tulagi from 7–9 August. Remaining with the carriers, she went to the aid of Saratoga on 30 August, when the carrier took a torpedo hit, and towed her from the danger area. Through September and October, she supported landings west of Lunga Point and on Funafuti.

As flagship of Task Force 67 (TF 67), she sortied on 29 November to intercept a Japanese destroyer force attempting to reinforce Guadalcanal. At 23:05 the next night, she spotted six Japanese ships, and the Battle of Tassafaronga was opened by her 8.00 in (203 mm) fire. She scored many hits on the destroyer Takanami, which sank. However, the gunfire failed to sink Takanami before she could fire her torpedoes, and in a twist of revenge two of these torpedoes hit Minneapolis, one on the port bow, the other in her number two fireroom, causing loss of power and severe damage; her bow collapsing back to the hawsepipes, her port side badly ruptured, and two firerooms open to the sea. Of the battle, American naval historian Samuel Eliot Morison wrote, "It is a painful truth that the Battle of Tassafaronga was a sharp defeat inflicted on an alert and superior cruiser force by a partially surprised and inferior destroyer force." Of her crew, 37 were killed in action while 36 were wounded.

The ship was saved however by skillful damage control work and seamanship that kept her afloat and enabled her to reach Tulagi. There, camouflaged with palm fronds and shrubs to protect her from frequent air raids, she was temporarily repaired by her own crew with the help of Seabees of the 27th Naval Construction Battalion stationed on the island, and was able to sail for extensive repairs at Mare Island Naval Shipyard. A new bow was built for her during her transit back to the shipyard and was almost ready to be mated on by the time of her arrival. While there she received a remodeling of her forward bridge and added new radars and numerous 20 mm and 40 mm anti-aircraft guns.

By August 1943, Minneapolis was back in the Pacific for 20 months of frontline duty, which would include every major Pacific operation by American forces save Iwo Jima. Her first was the bombardment of Wake on 5 October, then from 20 November to 4 December she joined in the assault and capture of Makin in the Gilberts. In December, she screened a carrier group in the pre-invasion strikes against Kwajalein and Majuro, serving on in the capture of the Marshalls into mid-February 1944. With the carriers blasting the Marianas and the Carolines, Minneapolis continued to guard them through raids on the Palaus, Truk, Satawan, Ponape, and other key Japanese bases into April, including a surface action off Truk during Operation Hailstone where she assisted in sinking the destroyer Maikaze and the armed trawler Shonan Maru. The latter raids were coordinated with the landings at Hollandia (currently known as Jayapura), New Guinea.

=== Battle of the Philippine Sea ===
In May, Minneapolis prepared at Majuro for the assaults in the Marianas, firing on Saipan in preinvasion bombardment on 14 June. As word came that a large Japanese force was sailing to attempt a disruption of the operation, Minneapolis rejoined TF 58 to screen the carriers during the Battle of the Philippine Sea on 19–20 June. As American aviators won another great victory, Minneapolis screened the carriers and provided antiaircraft fire. After taking a bomb miss close aboard, her crew again patched her up.

=== Guam ===
From 8 July to 9 August, Minneapolis brought her heavy guns to the support of the Marines winning Guam back from the enemy. Firing deep support, night harassing, and call fire, she won grateful praise from General Allen H. Turnage, commanding the 3rd Marine Division: "...a prime factor in the success of this operation...a job well done." From 6 September to 14 October, she gave similar essential aid to the capture of the Palaus, her operations at the close of that period preparing directly for the assault on Leyte. In the preinvasion bombardment force, she entered Leyte Gulf on 17 October, and she downed five enemy planes during the initial resistance to the assault.

=== Battle of Surigao Strait ===
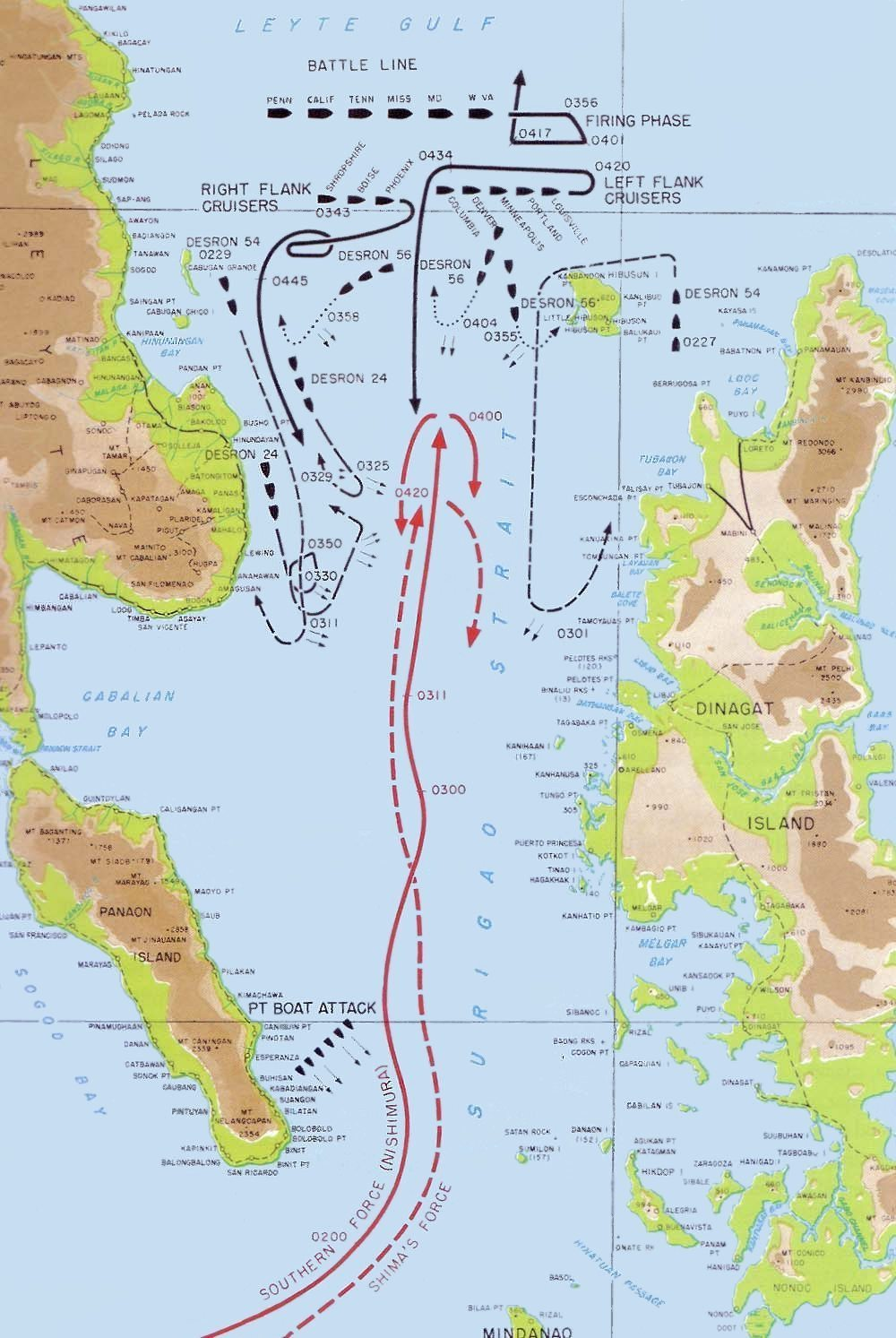
The Battle of Surigao Strait.

As the Japanese launched the three-pronged naval attack which would develop into the Battle for Leyte Gulf, Minneapolis was assigned on 24 October to Rear Admiral Jesse B. Oldendorf's bombardment group with other cruisers and older battleships. With them, she deployed across Surigao Strait that night, alert to any sign of contact with the enemy by the plucky PT-boats and destroyers fanned out ahead. As the Japanese ships steamed in column, they ignored the flank attacks of the smaller ships, heading straight for Oldendorf's battleline, which opened fire with an enormous coordinated salvo, quickly sinking the Japanese old battleship Yamashiro. The battleline, including Minneapolis, also crippled the heavy cruiser Mogami and the destroyer Shigure (the drifting Mogami was sunk by aircraft later that day). Admiral Oldendorf, in this Battle of Surigao Strait, had performed the classic maneuver of "crossing the T", meeting the individual fire of the enemy with his own massed fire.

Continuing to alternate carrier screening and bombardment duties in the Philippines, Minneapolis was on the scene for the attack and landings at Lingayen Gulf, Luzon from 4–18 January 1945 and the landings on Bataan and Corregidor from 13 to 18 February. During March, she was assigned to Task Force 54 (TF 54) for the invasion of Okinawa, off which she arrived for preinvasion bombardment on the 25th. She fired at once on Kerama Retto, seized first in a move to provide a safe haven for ships during the assault on Okinawa proper. When the main invasion began 1 April, Minneapolis bombarded the Japanese airfield at Naha, rendering it useless to the enemy, then began call fire as ground forces pinpointed her targets by radio.

After months of such action, her gun barrels were worn so badly as to need replacement, and she prepared to sail on 12 April. Her departure was delayed that day by the largest air attack yet of the Okinawa operation, during which she downed four would-be kamikazes and watched three others crash harmlessly into the sea. At nightfall, she sailed for Bremerton, Washington, where she repaired and replaced the linings of her gun barrels. Headed back for more action, she was in Subic Bay, Philippines, at the end of hostilities.

She flew the flag of Admiral Thomas C. Kinkaid as he accepted the Japanese surrender of Korea on 9 September, then patrolled the Yellow Sea, covering the landing of Marines at Taku and Qinhuangdao, China. After carrying homeward bound veterans to the west coast, she sailed on 14 January 1946 for the Panama Canal and Philadelphia. Here she was placed in commission, in reserve, on 21 May, and out of commission on 10 February 1947. She was sold for scrapping on 14 August 1959 to Union Metals and Alloys Corp.

Her bow is now a dive site in a small harbor on the northwest side of Tulagi Island, where many small shipwrecks and various equipment parts now lie dormant. It's often a spot for divers as it contrasts the busy Ironbottom Sound, where visitors search for marine life and macro photography.

== Awards ==
Minneapolis received 17 battle stars for World War II service, placing her among the most decorated US Naval vessels of World War II.
