= Operation Hailstone =

American attack on Truk Lagoon during World War II

- Part of the Gilbert and Marshall Islands campaign
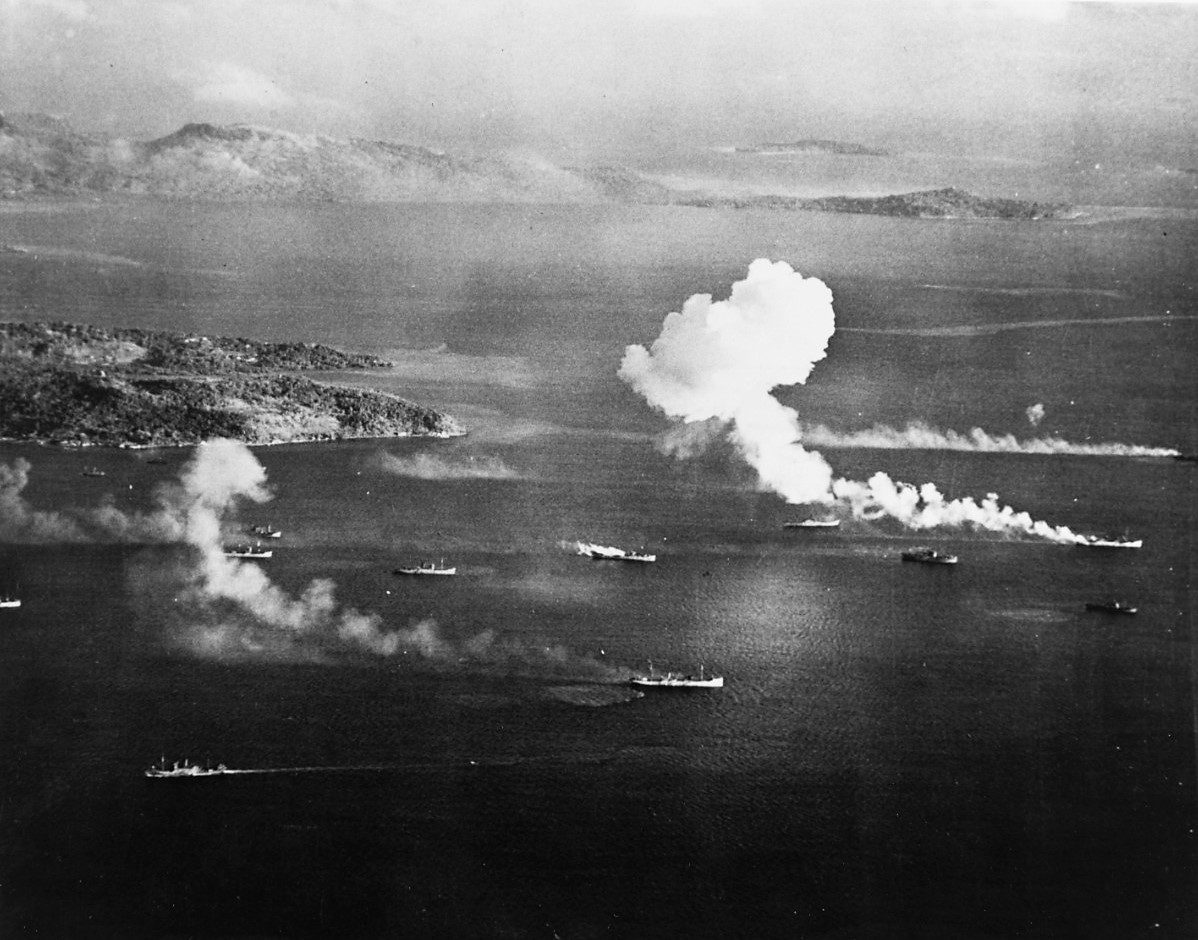
- Japanese ships off Dublon Island.
Date	17–18 February 1944
Location	Truk Lagoon, Caroline Islands 7.3393°N 151.8846°E
Result	American victory

Belligerents
United States	Japan

Commanders and leaders
Marc Mitscher	Masami Kobayashi

Strength
5 fleet carriers; 4 light carriers; 6 battleships; 10 cruisers; 28 destroyers; 10 submarines; 560 aircraft	5 cruisers; 8 destroyers; 5 other warships; 50 merchant ships; 350 aircraft

Casualties and losses
40 killed (Note: Deaths included 29 aircrew from assorted carriers plus 11 sailors aboard Intrepid. Aircraft losses included 12 fighters, seven torpedo-bombers, and 6 dive-bombers.); 1 fleet carrier damaged; 1 battleship slightly damaged; 25 aircraft destroyed	4,500+ killed; 2 light cruisers sunk; 4 destroyers sunk; 3 auxiliary cruisers sunk; 6 auxiliary ships sunk; 32 merchant ships sunk; 9 vessels damaged; 250+ aircraft destroyed

Operation Hailstone was a large-scale United States Navy air and surface attack on Truk Lagoon on 17–18 February 1944, conducted as part of the American offensive drive against the Imperial Japanese Navy in the Pacific Ocean theatre of World War II.

== Background ==
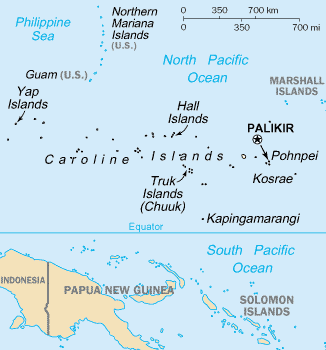
The Caroline Islands

Japanese troops occupied Micronesia, including the Caroline Islands, in 1914 and established Truk as a base as early as 1939. The lagoon was first built up as an anchorage for the Imperial Japanese Navy's 4th Fleet, its "South Seas Force". After the outbreak of war with the United States, the 4th Fleet was put under the command of the Combined Fleet, which continued to use Truk as a forward operating base into 1944. In addition to anchorages for warships and port facilities for shipping between the home islands and the Southern Resources Area, five airfields and a seaplane base were constructed at Truk, making it the only major Japanese airfield within flying range of the Marshall Islands. As Imperial Japan's main base in the South Pacific theatre of World War II, it was often described as the "Japanese Pearl Harbor".

There was a myth that Truk was heavily fortified, and it was given nicknames like "the Gibraltar of the Pacific." Despite the impressions of U.S. Navy leaders and the American public concerning Truk's projected strength as the "Japanese Pearl Harbor", Truk was never significantly reinforced or protected against land attack. In fact,

[T]he reality was somewhat different. (...) The lack of fortifications was less due to Japan's regard for international law than to Japan's economic limitations. It could not afford both a large navy and extensive naval fortifications. It opted to build up its naval forces, neglecting fixed defenses.

Japanese development of Truk's fortifications instead began in earnest in late 1943, with defensive measures being taken against a potential U.S. invasion. Airfields were extended and shore batteries were erected. Nonetheless, Japanese preparations were inadequate with few anti-aircraft guns and inadequate radar warning. The continued separate command arrangements made it hard for Navy fighter planes and Army troops to coordinate defensive efforts.

== Prelude ==
Because aircraft stationed at Truk could potentially interfere with the upcoming invasion of Eniwetok, and because Truk had recently served as a ferry point for the resupply of aircraft to Rabaul, Admiral Raymond Spruance ordered Vice Admiral Marc Mitscher's Fast Carrier Task Force, designated TF 58, to carry out air raids against Truk. Three of TF 58's four carrier task groups were committed to the operation. Their total strength consisted of five fleet carriers (Enterprise, Yorktown, Essex, Intrepid, and Bunker Hill) and four light carriers (Belleau Wood, Cabot, Monterey, and Cowpens), carrying more than 500 warplanes. Supporting these aircraft carriers was a task force of seven battleships and numerous heavy cruisers, light cruisers, destroyers, and submarines.

The Japanese, meanwhile, understood the weakness of their position at Truk. The IJN had begun withdrawing major units (battleships, heavy cruisers, carriers) from the anchorage as early as October 1943. The effective abandonment of Truk as a forward operating base accelerated during the first week of February 1944, following Japanese sightings of U.S. Marine Corps PB4Y-1 Liberator reconnaissance planes sent to reconnoiter the area.

== Battle ==
=== Air attacks ===
1944 U.S. newsreel describing the attack

The three carrier task groups committed to Hailstone moved into position and began launching their first fighter sweep 90 minutes before daybreak on 17 February 1944. No Japanese air patrol was active at the time, as the IJN's 22nd and 26th Air Flotillas were enjoying shore leave after weeks on high alert following the Liberator sightings. Similarly problematic for the Japanese, radar on Truk was not capable of detecting low-flying planes—a weakness probably known and exploited by Allied intelligence organizations. Furthermore, radar stations were not adequately manned and telephone communications were poor. Because of these factors, U.S. carrier aircraft achieved total surprise.

Japanese pilots scrambled just minutes before TF 58 planes arrived over Eten, Param, Moen, and Dublon Islands. Though more than 300 Imperial Japanese Navy Air Service (IJNAS) and Imperial Japanese Army Air Service (IJAAS) planes were present at Truk on the first day of the attacks, only about half of them were operational, compared to over 500 operational aircraft among the carriers of TF 58. U.S. Navy fighter pilots in their Grumman F6F Hellcats, with the advantages of speed, altitude, armor, and surprise, achieved a one-sided victory against IJNAS pilots flying Mitsubishi A6M Zero fighters. As many as 30 of the 80 Zeros sent up in response to the fighter sweep were shot down during the battle. Only token aerial resistance was encountered for the rest of the morning; almost no Japanese aircraft were present by the afternoon.

Due to the lack of air cover or warning, many merchant ships were caught at anchor, with only the islands' anti-aircraft guns for defense against American carrier planes. Some vessels outside the lagoon already steaming towards Japan were attacked by American submarines and sunk before they could make their escape. Other Japanese ships attempting to flee via the atoll's North Pass were bottled up by aerial attack and by Admiral Spruance's surface force, Task Group 50.9, which circumnavigated Truk, bombarding shore positions and engaging enemy ships.

Torpedo bomber and dive bomber squadrons from the American carrier air groups (CAGs) were responsible for the bulk of the damage inflicted on Japanese ground facilities. Early on the first day of Hailstone, Grumman TBF Avenger torpedo bomber squadrons from Enterprise's Carrier Air Group 10 (CAG-10) and Intrepid's CAG-6 dropped fragmentation and incendiary bombs on runways at Eten Island and the seaplane base on Moen Island. Dozens of aircraft were damaged or destroyed on the ground, further blunting any possible response by the Japanese to the strikes. Subsequent joint attacks by dive bombers (Note: All dive bomber squadrons with the exception of Bunker Hill's VB-17 flew the Douglas SBD Dauntless at this time. VB-17 was the first squadron to use the newer Curtiss SB2C Helldiver, which later replaced the Dauntless as the U.S. Navy's standard dive bomber.) and Avenger torpedo bombers cratered runways and destroyed hangar facilities.

Morning strikes were also launched against shipping in the lagoon. Lieutenant Commander James D. Ramage, commanding officer of Dive Bombing Squadron 10 (VB-10), is credited with sinking the previously damaged merchant tanker Hoyo Maru. Lieutenant James E. Bridges and his crew in one of Intrepid's Torpedo Squadron 6 (VT-6) Avengers scored a direct hit on the ammunition ship Aikoku Maru. The torpedo detonation set off the ammunition carried near the bow, resulting in a tremendous explosion which immediately sank the ship taking down 945 crew and passengers, and also engulfed Bridge's plane.

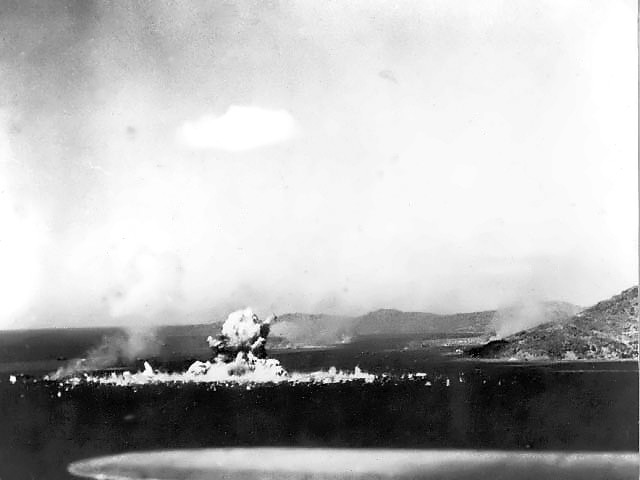
Japanese ammunition ship Aikoku Maru exploding after a torpedo hit, 17 February 1944.

By the second and third strikes of the day, CAG action reports listed the apparent enemy mission as "escape". Japanese ships that were able to make for open sea steamed for the North Pass exit from the lagoon while weathering repeated aerial attacks. One particular group of warships – the cruiser Katori, auxiliary cruiser Akagi Maru, destroyers Maikaze and Nowaki, and minesweeper Shonan Maru – was given special attention by carrier bombers. Multiple air groups attacked these ships, inflicting serious damage. Yorktown's dive- and torpedo-bombing squadrons claimed two hits on the violently maneuvering Katori and hits on another cruiser and multiple destroyers; Essex bombers claimed five hits on a Katori-class cruiser, stating that the ship was stopped dead in the water after the attack. Akagi Maru was sunk by air attacks.

=== Surface action ===
At this point, reports reached Admiral Spruance concerning the group of warships fleeing through North Pass. Spruance was so adamant on engaging in ship-to-ship combat that his carrier commander, Admiral Mitscher, ordered his CAGs to stop attacking Katori and her companions. Spruance put himself in tactical command of Task Group 50.9, made up of four destroyers, heavy cruisers Minneapolis and New Orleans, and the new battleships Iowa and New Jersey, which he personally led in a surface engagement against the previously damaged Japanese ships. The battered Japanese ships did not stand much of a chance against Task Group 50.9, though members of his staff saw Spruance's decision to engage in surface action when aircraft likely could have achieved similar results as needlessly reckless. Indeed, the Japanese destroyer Maikaze managed to fire torpedoes at the battleship New Jersey during the engagement. Fortunately for Spruance, the torpedoes missed, and the "battle" ended with predictably one-sided results. The U.S. Navy surface combatants received virtually no damage, and it was the only time that Iowa and New Jersey fired their main guns at enemy ships.

Meanwhile, New Jersey's 5-inch (127 mm) guns combined fire with U.S. cruisers to sink Maikaze and Shonan Maru, while Iowa targeted and sank Katori, which was already dead in the water, with numerous hits from her main battery. Nowaki was the only Japanese ship from this group to escape, sailing through a gauntlet of fire from Iowa and New Jersey, suffering only very minor damage at the hand of a straddle from a high capacity, 16-inch (406 mm) round from New Jersey at the extremely long range of 35,700 yards (20.3 statute miles or 32.6 kilometers).

=== Japanese night raid ===
Retaliation for the day's strikes arrived late at night in the form of small groups of Japanese bombers flying out of Truk and Formosa probing the task groups' defenses. From roughly 21:00 on 17 February to just minutes past midnight on 18 February, at least five groups of between one and three enemy planes attempted to sneak past screening ships to strike at the fleet carriers. One lone Rikko-type twin engine bomber from the 755th Kōkūtai (Genzan Air Group) made its attack on Task Group 58.2 and torpedoed the starboard quarter of the Intrepid, damaging steering control and killing 11 sailors. Intrepid was forced to retire to the U.S. for repairs and did not return to combat until August 1944.

== Assessment of the attack ==
The attacks on Truk have often been described as the Americans' payback for the Japanese attack on Pearl Harbor several years earlier, although American carrier aircrews were disappointed that major Japanese surface warships were absent, as they had been withdrawn prior to the raid (in parallel to the absence of U.S. carriers from Pearl Harbor). The only warships that were left to the Americans to attack were relatively insignificant, consisting of two light cruisers and four destroyers plus some auxiliaries.

Nonetheless, Japanese losses at Truk were severe as these affected the navy's logistical capabilities. Truk had been a key center for aircraft distribution and repair in supporting Japanese naval aviation. Some 17,000 tons of stored fuel were destroyed by American airstrikes. Shipping losses totaled almost 200,000 tons, including several precious fleet oilers, of which the Japanese navy had a dwindling number by early 1944. Vessels sunk at Truk represented almost one-tenth of total Japanese shipping losses between 1 November 1943 and 30 June 1944. At this point in the war, Japan's industrial capability was unable to replenish such losses in ships and aircraft, in contrast to the American rearmament after the Pearl Harbor raid. In contrast to Truk, Pearl Harbor's oil storage tanks and repair yards had remained untouched during the attacks on 7 December 1941.

After the Truk attacks, the Imperial Japanese Navy General Staff blamed Masami Kobayashi and relieved him of his command two days later. On 30 May 1944, Kobayashi was forced from active service and on 31 May 1944, he went into the reserves.

== Aftermath ==
After Operation Hailstone, the U.S. deployed aircraft and submarine to isolate Truk, which began the effective severance of Japanese shipping lanes between the home islands and critical fuel supplies to the south. The ultimate effect of this interdiction was evident during the Battle of Leyte Gulf in October 1944, when IJN forces were compelled to sortie separately from Japan and Lingga Roads due to fuel constraints. The neutralization of Truk and the seizure of Eniwetok paved the way for the upcoming invasion of Saipan, which placed U.S. land-based heavy bombers within range of the Japanese home islands for the first time in the war.

No significant Japanese naval buildup occurred at Truk after Operation Hailstone. Subsequently, the garrison made limited attempts to rebuild Truk as a bomber air base and to increase its anti-aircraft defenses. In February, the Japanese command decided to pull all remaining Japanese airmen and their crews from Rabaul, which was earlier cut off by the Allies' island hopping campaign. Between 70 and 120 Japanese aircraft flew from Rabaul to Truk on the morning of 19 February, right after Operation Hailstone. Aircraft mechanics attempted to leave Rabaul on 21 February but their ship, SS Kokai Maru, was sunk by Allied bombers. Spruance sent in carrier planes again on 29 April to attack Truk, destroying more Japanese air defenses, ground facilities and aircraft. Thereafter, U.S. air units regularly conducted reconnaissance and raids upon Truk until the end of the war to ensure that it was not restored to its former operational capacity. In Operation Inmate, which took place in June 1945, British forces attacked Truk with cruisers and carrier-based bombers to gain Pacific combat experience before more demanding operations against the Japanese home islands. By that time, historian David Hobbs has stated that Truk had been "reduced to starving impotence".

Imperial Japanese Army reinforcements, which had arrived at the atoll before Operation Hailstone, put increasing strain on available foodstuffs and medical supplies. The Truk garrison received few shipments of reinforcements or supplies following the capture of the Palau islands by American forces in September 1944. The garrison's main activity from mid-1944 onwards was growing food to sustain itself. The tropical conditions and damage caused by air attacks complicated this effort, so most of the Japanese personnel became malnourished and ravaged by disease. Nevertheless, the garrison still managed to take extensive measures to protect the atoll from an anticipated U.S. invasion (which never came), and placed large stores of food and other supplies in reserve for such an eventuality. Dwindling ammunition even limited the ability of shore batteries to fend off intermittent attacks by Allied forces, including experimental raids by Boeing B-29 Superfortresses and attacks by Allied carrier aircraft. Following the end of the war in August 1945, United States forces found that the garrison still held enough ammunition to supply its gun batteries for at least 30 days of combat.

Truk's garrison formally surrendered at a ceremony conducted on board USS Portland on 2 September 1945, the same day as the general Japanese surrender documents were signed. The Japanese soldiers and sailors on Truk, about 24,000, were repatriated in November and December 1945.

Truk is renowned today as a tourist destination for divers interested in seeing the many shipwrecks left in the lagoon, many of which were sunk in Operation Hailstone.

== List of ships in Truk at the time of the attack ==
=== Warships ===
List derived from Jeffery's War Graves, Munition Dumps and Pleasure Grounds (2007)

==== Sunk ====
- Cruiser (CL)
  - Katori (香取) 5,800 tons
  - Naka (那珂) 5,195 tons
- Destroyer (DD)
  - 1 modern
    - Maikaze (舞風) 陽炎型 2,000 tons
  - 3 obsolescent
    - Fumizuki (文月) 睦月型 1,320 tons
    - Oite (追風) 神風型 1,270 tons
    - Tachikaze (太刀風) 峯風型 1,215 tons
- Submarine chaser
  - CH-29, 440 tons
  - CH-24, 440 tons
- Auxiliary submarine chaser Shonan Maru #15 (第15昭南丸), 355 tons
- Motor torpedo boat #10, 85 tons

==== Damaged ====
- Repair ship Akashi (明石) 10,500 tons
- Seaplane tender Akitsushima (秋津洲) 4,650 tons
- Destroyer (DD)
  - Matsukaze (松風) 神風型 1,400 tons
  - Shigure (時雨) 白露型 1,685 tons
- Submarine
  - I-10 (伊10), 2,919 tons
  - RO-42, 1,115 tons
- Submarine chaser CHa-20
- Target ship Hakachi (波勝) 1,641 tons

=== Merchant ships ===
List derived from Jeffery's War Graves, Munition Dumps and Pleasure Grounds (2007)

==== Sunk ====
- Auxiliary cruiser
  - Aikoku Maru (愛国丸) 10,348 tons
  - Akagi Maru (赤城丸) 7,367 tons
  - Kiyosumi Maru (清澄丸) 6,983 tons
- Navy transport
  - Hoki Maru (伯耆丸) 7,112 tons
  - Yamagiri Maru (山霧丸) 7,112 tons
  - Fujikawa Maru (富士川丸) 6,938 tons
  - Navy transport/freighter San Francisco Maru/Sōkō Maru (桑港丸) 5,831 tons
  - Reiyo Maru (麗洋丸) 5,446 tons
  - Seiko Maru (西江丸)? 5,385 tons
  - passenger/cargo ship Kensho Maru (乾祥丸) 4,862 tons
  - freighter Hanakawa Maru (花川丸) 4,739 tons
  - passenger/cargo ship Sankisan Maru or Yamakisan Maru (山鬼山丸) 4,776 tons
  - freighter Hokuyo Maru (北洋丸) 4,217 tons
  - freighter Momokawa Maru (桃川丸) 3,829 tons
  - Navy water carrier/passenger/cargo ship Nippo Maru (日豊丸) 3,764 tons
  - freighter Unkai Maru #6 (第六雲海丸) 3,220 tons
  - Taiho Maru (大邦丸) 2,827 tons
  - freighter Shotan Maru (松丹丸) 1,999 tons
  - freighter Gosei Maru (五星丸) 1,931 tons
- Freighter Taikichi Maru or Tachi Maru (泰吉丸) 1,891 tons
- Army transport
  - Gyoten Maru (暁天丸) 6,854 tons
  - freighter Nagano Maru (長野丸) 3,824 tons
  - Yubae Maru (夕映丸) 3,217 tons
- Submarine tender
  - Heian Maru (平安丸) 11,614 tons
  - Rio de Janeiro Maru (リオデジャネイロ丸) 9,626 tons
- Oiler
  - Fleet oiler Shinkoku Maru (神国丸) 10,020 tons
  - Oil tanker Fujisan Maru (富士山丸) 9,524 tons
- Auxiliary oil tanker
  - whaler Tonan Maru #3 (第三図南丸) 19,209 tons
  - Houyou Maru or Hoyo Maru (宝洋丸) 8,691 tons
  - passenger/cargo ship Amagisan Maru (天城山丸) 7,620 tons

==== Damaged ====
- Cargo ship Sōya (宗谷) 3,800 tons

== See also ==
- Operation Inmate
- US Naval Base Carolines
- Naval Base Eniwetok
- Naval Base Gilbert Islands
- Naval Base Marshall Islands
