= Return to the Sea (TV series) =

American documentary TV series (1991-92)

- Genre: Science documentary
- Presented by: Bill Lovin
- Narrated by: Bill Lovin
- Composer: Robert Griffin
- Country of origin: United States
- Original language: English
- No. of seasons: 2 (plus special)
- No. of episodes: 14

Production
- Producers: Jim Bramlett, Bill Lovin
- Cinematography: Bill Lovin
- Running time: ca. 27 minutes (1991–1992) ca. 58 minutes (1995)
- Production companies: The UNC Center for Public Television/North Carolina Public Television and Marine Grafics

Original release
- Network: PBS
- Release: 1991 – 1992

Return to the Sea is an American science documentary television series that aired on PBS from 1991 to 1992, with an additional special that was broadcast in 1995. The series focuses on topics of interest in recreational diving and the conservation of oceanic and coastal environments.

== Synopsis ==
Underwater cinematographer Bill Lovin presents the series, in which viewers "return to the sea" in each episode. Episodes cover a wide range of topics including marine biology, shipwrecks and marine archaeology, underwater photography, decompression sickness, deep-sea exploration, threats to marine and coastal environments and undersea archeological sites, and the contribution of everyday people to recreational diving and conservation. Recurring themes in the series are how improvements in diving equipment have made recreational diving safe and accessible for everyone rather than only for scientists, explorers, and adventurers; how human carelessness and thoughtlessness can damage environments and endanger wildlife; and how everyday people can contribute to understanding and conserving marine and coastal environments.

== Production notes ==
Some of the half-hour episodes broadcast in 1991 and 1992 cover single topics, while others are divided into two distinct segments. The 1995 special is the only one-hour episode and consists of three distinct segments.

Bill Lovin co-produced the series, presents and narrates each episode, wrote some of the episodes, and captured the underwater cinematography used in the series. The UNC Center for Public Television, rebranded as North Carolina Public Television by the show's second season, produced the series in association with Lovin's company Marine Grafics.

== Broadcast history ==
Return to the Sea premiered on PBS in 1991 with a run of seven half-hour episodes for its first season. A second season of six half-hour episodes followed in 1992. The final episode, a one-hour special, aired in 1995.

In 2020, Bill Lovin created the Web site OceanArchives and uploaded to it all 14 complete episodes of Return to the Sea – as well as separate video files of some of the individual segments of multi-segment episodes – so they can be viewed, downloaded, and used for free for non-commercial purposes under a fair use policy, with a goal of assisting educators and students.

== Episodes ==
=== Season 1 (1991) ===
No. in season	Title	Directed by	Written by	Original release date
101	"A Day on the Reef"	uncredited	uncredited	1991
A discussion of corals – including brain coral, elkhorn coral, pillar coral, and boulder coral – and their construction of coral reefs and an examination of the creatures active on a Caribbean reef during daylight hours. At dawn, animals active by night, such as the squirrelfish, black crinoid, sharptail eel, goldentail moray, spotted moray, and green moray seek shelter for the day in crevices, under ledges, or by retreating into deeper, darker water. Thirty minutes after sunrise, a different population – coral reef fish as well as the lettuce slug – teems around the reef. By midmorning, human recreational divers are swimming around the reef, and stoplight parrotfish, yellowhead jawfish, southern stingrays, black jacks, groupers, cleaner fish, butterflyfish, trumpetfish, peacock flounders, and sponges are active. By late afternoon, the reef is almost empty, as creatures active by day already have retreated for the night.
102	"Secrets of the Shark"	uncredited	uncredited	1991
The episode dispels various myths about sharks – including the idea that they are aggressive toward divers – and describes their anatomy and senses. It includes a dive on the wreck of the submarine USS Tarpon off Cape Hatteras, North Carolina, to study the sand tiger shark and its habitat and a trip to Cocos Island in the Pacific Ocean off Costa Rica to film the whitetip reef shark and hammerhead shark, as well as the manta ray, a relative of the shark.
103	"The Art of Underwater Photography/Fish Senses"	uncredited	uncredited	1991
The episode's first segment, "The Art of Underwater Photography," examines the challenges and rewards of taking photographs and making films underwater, which by the early 1990s had become the most popular activity for recreational divers. The segment discusses the challenges of photographing shipwrecks and of filming and photography in different light levels at different depths; how advances in camera and lighting technology by the early 1990s had made underwater photography cheaper, easier, and more accessible for divers; and how photography allows a greater understanding of the details of the anatomy and behavior of marine creatures. The second segment, "Fish Senses," describes the senses of sight, hearing, taste, smell, and touch in marine creatures, including how sight varies between fish, squid, crabs and lobsters, the conch, and scallops and clams; how excellent night vision benefits the squirrelfish; how fish use nostrils to smell; how crabs both smell their environment and taste it through their legs; how the goatfish uses barbels to feel the ocean bottom; the lateral line, a sensory organ unique to fish; and the ampullae of Lorenzini, which give sharks and stingrays such as the southern stingray the ability to sense electrical fields. The segment also highlights the ways in which the flounder uses sight to help it camouflage itself; how the toadfish makes sound to find mates and scare off other fish; how the lettuce sea slug and flatworms use their coloration to signal predators that they do not taste good; and how the parrotfish uses a cocoon of mucus to block its smell from reaching predators while it sleeps at night.
104	"The Ocean at Night/The Sea of Cortez"	uncredited	uncredited	1991
The episode's first segment, "The Ocean at Night," discusses the ease and safety of night diving and the opportunities it creates to encounter creatures which are too skittish to approach in daylight or are only active and visible at night. The segment includes footage of the guineafowl puffer, basket star, sea feather, brittle star, and sea cucumber; sea urchins, shrimp, and marine worms; a "living chain" of planktonic creatures; jellyfish, crabs, and lobsters; the soapfish (including the first mating ritual of the species ever filmed); and an octopus. The second segment, "The Sea of Cortez," discusses the world's newest sea, the Sea of Cortez (also known as the Gulf of California and the Sea of Cortés), the habitat it provides, and its wildlife, including the brown pelican, whales, dolphins, sea lions, manta rays, hammerhead sharks, triggerfish, butterflyfish, and wrasse. It also discusses how the use of DDT once threatened the brown pelican with extinction; how overfishing has led to a drastic decline in the populations of hammerheads and manta rays in the Sea of Cortez; how overhunting once threatened the existence of the sea's sea lion population; and other aspects of man's impact on the creatures of the sea.
105	"Graveyard of the Atlantic...Graveyard of the Pacific"	uncredited	uncredited	1991
The waters off Cape Hatteras, North Carolina, and in Truk Lagoon (now Chuuk Lagoon) in Micronesia both are known as graveyards of ships, and both have many wrecks of ships sunk during World War II. The wreck of the tanker SS Cassimer creates an artificial reef that harbors tropical creatures from the Caribbean, such as butterflyfish and spiny lobsters, that travel north on the Gulf Stream to the waters off North Carolina; fishing nets and fish traps snagged and abandoned on the wreck still kill many creatures. Dives in Truk Lagoon on the wrecks of the aircraft transport Fujikawa Maru at a depth of 50 feet (15 m), the destroyer Fumizuki at 130 feet (40 m), and the cargo liner San Francisco Maru at 170 feet (52 m) show how the types of corals on wrecks changes with depth and how deeper wrecks cannot support coral growth. Footage of Fujikawa Maru includes a Mitsubishi A6M Zero fighter aircraft in her hold and a machine gun and its ammunition and a 4.7-inch (120 mm) gun on her deck; that of Fumizuki shows a 4.7-inch (120 mm) gun on her deck; and that of San Francisco Maru shows a tank and a 3-inch (76 mm) gun on her deck, naval mines in her hold, and Toyota trucks in her hold and on her deck. The episode also describes how corrosion, marine worms, water turbulence, and human souvenir hunting degrade saltwater wrecks over time, and how marine salvage operations severely damaged the wreck of the tanker SS John D. Gill off Cape Hatteras. The episode contrasts the lack of legal and ethical protection of Cape Hatteras shipwrecks with the situation in Truk Lagoon, where laws protect the wrecks so they can be preserved as historical reminders of World War II and as attractions for recreational divers.
106	"People Who Make a Difference"	uncredited	uncredited	1991
Profiles of Norine Rouse, Jill Robinson, and Ted Bridis. Rouse, a housewife in Palm Beach, Florida, took up recreational diving and became a scuba instructor and conservationist. She advocates limitations on – or the prohibition of – spearfishing, monitors the visits of sea turtles to her area, and overcame a bout with decompression sickness ("the bends") to continue diving. Robinson, who wrote a book for disabled divers, and Bridis, who counsels disabled veterans, are themselves disabled. They find movement in the water easier than on land and use prosthetics and gadgetry they invented to compensate for their disabilities while diving. They nonetheless face resistance to their diving activities from some dive boat captains and dive shop owners and employees who continue to think that diving is dangerous for disabled people. The episode includes discussions of decompression sickness, buoyancy control, and buddy diving, and it includes footage of Rouse's interactions with sea turtles and of the goatfish, the sergeant major, and the green moray Robinson, Bridis, and Lovin encountered during dives on the wreck of the United States Coast Guard cutter USCGC Duane off Florida.
107	"The Reef at the End of the Road/Last Days of the Manatee"	uncredited	uncredited	1991
The episode's first segment, "The Reef at the End of the Road," examines threats to the coral reef off the Florida Keys. It discusses how mangrove forests and sea grass protect the reef from runoff from shore, and how economic development and booming tourism in the Florida Keys have allowed runoff to reach such a level that it now reaches the reef, causing eutrophication, in which algae kills corals. The growth in tourism and other human activities also has led to increased pollution and damage to the reef through ship and boat groundings, anchoring, and destructive behaviors by recreational divers. The segment describes efforts to protect the reef by providing mooring buoys to reduce the use of anchors, cleaning up discarded trash, limiting and zoning ship and boat traffic and tourist activities, limitation of coastal development to preserve mangroves, educating children in the need to preserve and protect the reef and mangroves, the creation of artificial reefs to create additional habitats for marine life and draw recreational divers away from natural reefs, and the creation and expansion of United States National Marine Sanctuaries. The second segment, "Last Days of the Manatee," discusses the evolution, anatomy, and behavior of the endangered manatee (or "sea cow"), its decline from a population of 60,000 spread from Texas to North Carolina to about 1,000 limited to central and southern Florida, and how human activities have contributed to the manatee's decline thanks to reduced water quality, loss of habitat, competition with humans in inland manatee wintering areas, shorter lifespans, and deaths in collisions with ships and boats.

=== Season 2 (1992) ===
No. in season	Title	Directed by	Written by	Original release date
201	"Life in a Salt Marsh/Big Sweep"	uncredited	David Hardy	1992
The episode's first segment, "Life in a Salt Marsh," describes the ways in which a coastal salt marsh – flooded with seawater by the incoming tide and then drained when the tide goes out – is the most productive ecosystem on earth, protecting the land from erosion by waves, filtering and oxygenating water, serving as a nursery for young sea creatures, and providing an economically important source of seafood. The segment documents a North Carolina Maritime Museum field trip to a salt marsh and describes the adaptations and behaviors of plants and animals which live in or visit salt marshes, including pickleweed, marsh periwhinkles, mud snails, hermit crabs, spider crabs, horseshoe crabs, diamondback terrapins, North American river otters, and birds such as rails, egrets, seagulls (highlighting laughing gulls), herons, ibises, and brown pelicans. The segment also discusses threats to salt marshes posed by human encroachment such as habitat destruction, pollution, and boating. The second segment, "Big Sweep," documents activities in North Carolina that were part of Big Sweep – an annual single-day nationwide volunteer event to pick up trash along the beaches, rivers, and lakes of the United States – and emphasizes the special danger plastic trash poses to aquatic wildlife.
202	"Deep Sea Secrets"	uncredited	Jim Bramlett	1992
A description of the capabilities and operations of the research submarine Johnson Sea Link I as she operates from the mother ship Seward Johnson off Cape Hatteras, North Carolina, to explore the midwater column and the benthos to determine the possible environmental impact of proposed offshore drilling there. The episode culminates in a dive to a depth of 3,000 feet (910 m) to take core samples in a submarine canyon, where the submersible encounters marine snow and a jumbled landscape.
203	"The Mystery of the Bends"	uncredited	David Hardy	1992
A discussion of the discovery, history of study, causes, symptoms, dangers, and treatment of decompression sickness, known as "the bends." The episode describes the advantages and disadvantages of dive tables and dive computers and the function of a recompression chamber in treating the bends, and explores various still-mysterious and controversial aspects of decompression sickness, including risk factors such as age of the diver and flying after diving. It includes trips to the United States Navy Experimental Diving Unit in Panama City Beach, Florida, and Duke University to see research activities attempting to improve understanding of the bends and a visit to the Divers Alert Network, where volunteers man telephones to provide advice and assistance to divers who contract the ailment.
204	"Reunion"	uncredited	Bill Lovin	1992
The story of the World War II sinking of the German submarine U-352 by the United States Coast Guard Cutter USCGC Icarus off North Carolina on May 9, 1942; the discovery of U-352′s wreck in 1975; and its subsequent popularity as a dive site. The episode culminates in a reunion in North Carolina of members of U-352′s and Icarus′s crews for a memorial service for U-352′s crew on the 50th anniversary of her sinking on May 9, 1992. The episode includes interviews with crewmen of both ships and with one of the divers who discovered her wreck.
205	"Small World"	uncredited	uncredited	1992
Divers have only a limited time underwater while exploring a coral reef, and often overlook the smaller things until they examine photographs and video footage later. The episode covers these smaller things, including coral polyps, how they construct reefs, their symbiotic relationship with algae, and coral bleaching; sea anemones; plankton; sea cucumbers; cleaning stations and the tiny cleaner fish such as gobies which base themselves on a coral or a sponge and clean larger fish including groupers, stoplight parrotfish, and barracudas; Pederson's cleaning shrimp, which also cleans fish and hides among the tentacles of the ringed anemone alongside the snapping shrimp; an isopod parasitizing a black bar soldierfish; mollusks, such as the conch, lettuce sea slug, and flamingo tongue snail; how hand-feeding of Nassau groupers has changed their normally skittish behavior around divers; and the anatomy and behaviors of groupers.
206	"The Reef...and the Rainforest"	uncredited	Jim Bramlett	1992
A trip to Belize to observe the similarities between the two most diverse and active environments on earth – the coral reef and the tropical rainforest. The episode compares the profusion of corals and the diversity of habitats it creates to the profusion of plants in the rainforest and the wide variety of habitats there; describes the abundance of life in each environment, how organisms in both – such as corals and sponges on the reef and plants in the rainforest – must compete for space, and how insects in the rainforest and small reef creatures colonize every ecological niche; shows parallel survival strategies between reef creatures and plants and animals of the rainforest, such as the use of thorns and spikes to ward off predators and camouflage to deceive them; and discusses modern-day Belize City and the Maya civilization that once thrived in Belize. The episode includes footage of the Belize Barrier Reef – part of the Mesoamerican Barrier Reef System, the world's second-largest after the Great Barrier Reef – and of cays off Belize and the rainforest in the country's interior; of the tapir, margay, jaguar, toucan, ocellated turkey, howler monkey, saga tree, sea urchin, flounder, stonefish, trumpetfish, and green vine snake; of a lizard, termites and their nest, bats in a ruined Mayan temple, and of frigatebirds and boobies on a cay on Lighthouse Reef; and of Belize City, Mayan ruins in Belize, and Tikal in neighboring Guatemala. The episode includes a discussion of damage to the reef through coral bleaching and the careless actions of divers, the destruction of the rainforest to create farmland, and of the Government of Belize's effort to preserve the reef, cays, and rainforest by promoting ecotourism, which makes conservation economically important to the local population. It also highlights the work of the co-owners of the Chan Chich Lodge to create ecotourism to reduce illegal activities in the rainforest and give the local people a financial stake in preserving it, and of Sharon Matola, founder and director of the Belize Zoo, to give the people of Belize a greater appreciation of the rainforest and its animals.

=== Special (1995) ===
No. in season	Title	Directed by	Written by	Original release date
301	"Oceans Under Glass/Swimming with Whales/Whales Weep Not"	uncredited	Jim Bramlett, Bill Lovin	1995
The special's first segment, "Oceans Under Glass," focuses on the operations of the North Carolina Aquariums and highlights the ways in which rivers, sounds, marshes, and barrier islands are important to ocean creatures. The segment covers the aquariums′ field trips, hosting of school visits, and collection of animals in salt marshes; their touch tanks and how they create shipwreck displays; the equipment and techniques they use to make their own salt water, maintain water quality for the organisms in their tanks, and feed the aquarium animals; and their sea turtle rescue and rehabilitation program and research into the causes of sea turtle deaths. The segment also describes the near-extinction, recovery, and nesting and chick-rearing behaviors of the osprey, and visits a tide pool on a rocky outcrop on North Carolina's coast. It includes footage of mosquito larvae, horseshoe crabs, various crabs including a blue crab, filefish, a comb jelly, American alligators, green turtles, loggerhead turtles, an isopod, a sea star, mole crabs, and a striped hermit crab living in a moon snail shell. The second segment, "Swimming With Whales," profiles Dave Woodward – a pioneering recreational diver, scuba instructor, and underwater photographer who in 1976 worked with Marlon Perkins as a still photographer for Wild Kingdom during filming of humpback whales – as he once again swims with them at their wintering and calving grounds at Silver Bank in the Caribbean. The segment includes extensive footage of the whales and discusses their social and mating behaviors, research into their individual identities and overall numbers, and whale songs. The third segment, which derives its title from the D. H. Lawrence poem "Whales Weep Not," documents the death of an emaciated young female sperm whale on the beach at Wrightsville Beach, North Carolina, and the subsequent necropsy that revealed her stomach was full of trash discarded by humans, highlighting the danger human-generated detritus poses to sea creatures.
