= Wildlife law in Belize =

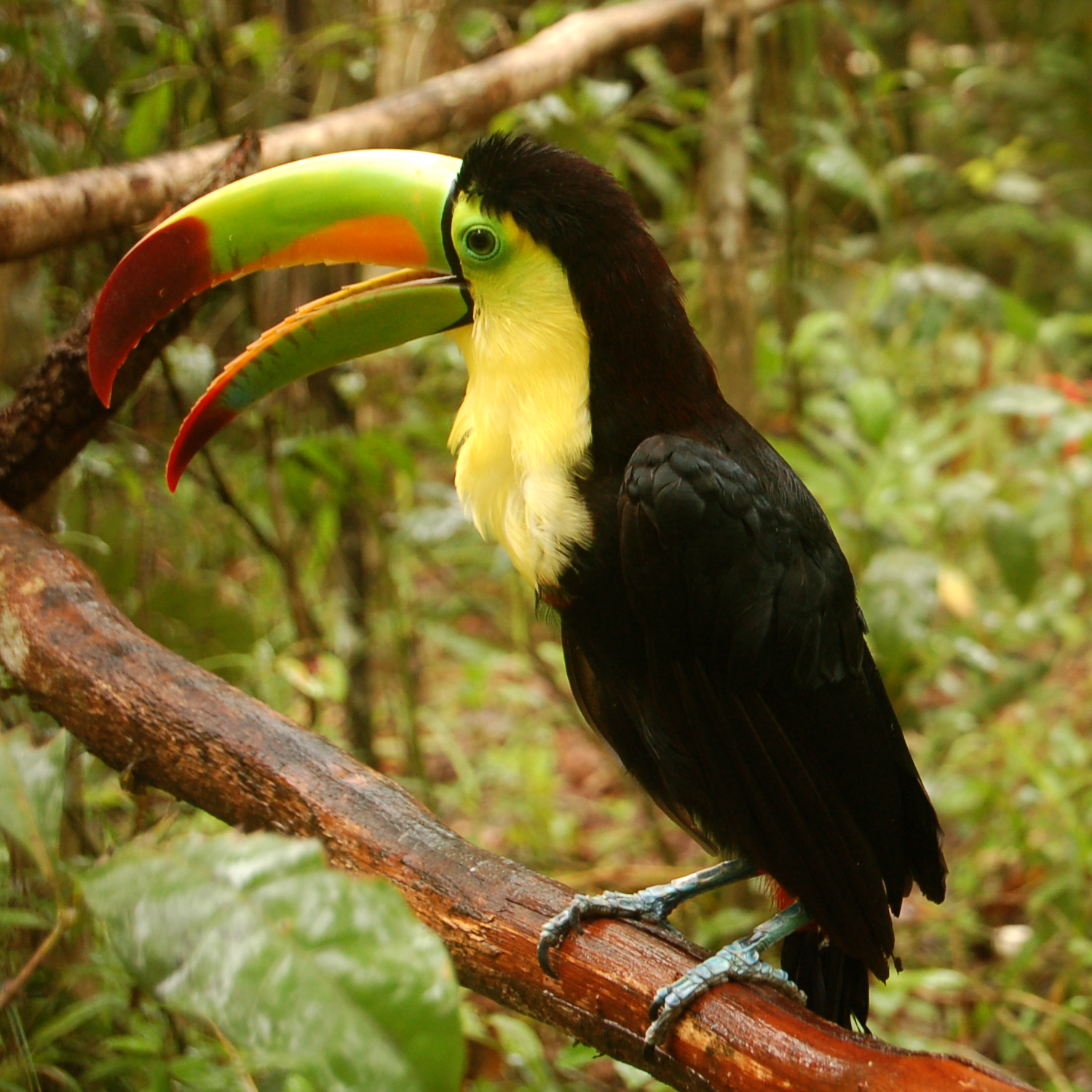
A keel-billed toucan, the national bird of Belize

After declaring independence in 1981, Belize enacted the Wildlife Protection Act, which is the main source of wildlife law in Belize. Wildlife in Belize is defined as any undomesticated mammal, reptile or bird, amphibian, and any egg, nest or part or product thereof. Although Belize is only two hundred miles (320 km) long and a little more than sixty miles (97 km) wide, it hosts a remarkable abundance of flora and fauna. It is the home of more than 150 species of mammals, 549 birds, 150 amphibians and reptiles, nearly 600 species of freshwater and marine fish, and 3,408 species of vascular plants.

The Forest Department under the Ministry of Forestry, Fisheries and Sustainable Development is the regulatory body that enforces the Wildlife Protection Act. The Wildlife Protection Act's main goal is to rescue the over one hundred globally threatened species in Belize from local extinction. The National List of Critical Native Species includes 11 critically endangered species, 31 endangered species, and 63 vulnerable species.

In Belize, threats to wildlife from the illegal wildlife trade have been, in general, historically marginal; Belize has low population pressure and large wilderness areas. Parrots are the major species threatened by the wildlife trade. People of all classes keep pet parrots; however, in 2016 the Government of Belize closed the amnesty period for registering parrots already in captivity and began prohibiting the ownership of newly-captured baby parrots under the National Captive Wildlife permit program. Although the government of Belize has imposed conservation measures, the increasing human population of Belize, forest clearance, and forest fragmentation have pressured wildlife. The percentage of forest cover in Belize has declined from 74.4% in 1980 to 60.3% in 2014.

In the last five years, the Forest Department has adopted a Wildlife Conservation Program (abbreviated to WCP), which provides active management and protection of wildlife. The legal authority for the Wildlife Conservation Program comes from the Wildlife Protection Act. The program is responsible for implementing the Convention on Biological Diversity, to which Belize is a party, and meeting Belize's obligation to maintain its threatened species, including those targeted by the wildlife trade. It is also a party to the Convention on International Trade in Endangered Species of Wild Fauna and Flora (CITES), which limits trade in threatened wildlife through the CITES permission system. The WCP enforces these treaties through measures that protect wildlife from hunting, poaching, and other extraction activities.

To accomplish its conservation-related goals, the Belize Forest Department has memoranda of understanding with rehabilitation and conservation organisations in Belize including Belize Bird Rescue, Wildtracks Rehabilitation Program (Primate and Manatee), Belize Zoo, the Green Iguana Project, Belize Raptor Center, Friends for Conservation and Development, Belize Wildlife and Referral Clinic, Aces Wildlife Rescue, and Sea to Shore Alliance.

The Forest Department has also implemented closed and open seasons for popular hunted species such as deer (male and female), armadillo, gibnut, peccaries, iguanas, and game birds.

== See also ==
- Flora of Belize
- Fauna of Belize
- List of endemic species of Belize
- List of birds of Belize
- List of mammals of Belize
- Belize Bird Rescue
