= Tique =

Tique is a Spanish colloquial term for two different species of trees in the Western Hemisphere:

- Aextoxicon punctatum, also called olivillo or aceitunillo, native to Chile and Argentina
- Acoelorraphe wrightii, also called Paurotis palm or Everglades palm, native to the greater Caribbean region
