= April (tapir) =

Tapir living at the Belize Zoo

April the Tapir
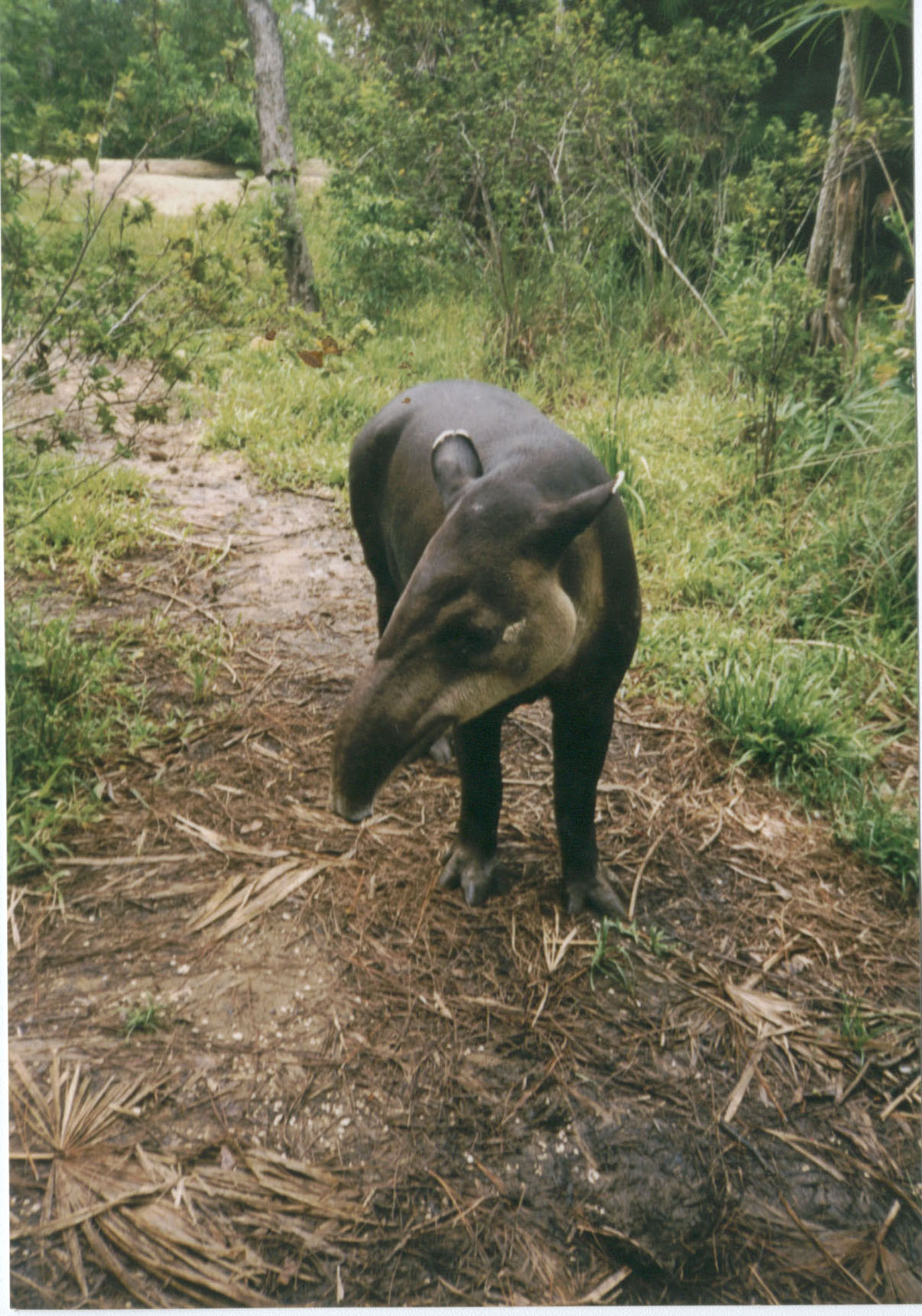
- April the Tapir, Belize (1984)
- Species: Tapirus bairdii
- Sex: Female
- Born: 27 April 1983; Belize
- Died: 31 October 2013 (aged 30); Belize Zoo
- Known for: being the oldest living tapir in captivity

April (27 April 1983 – 31 October 2013) was a tapir living at the Belize Zoo in Belize from 1983 until her death in 2013. She was a Baird's tapir, the national animal of Belize.

April was born on 27 April 1983. That date is now National Tapir Day in Belize, and World Tapir Day globally. April first came to the zoo in 1983 when she was very ill from a screwworm infestation. Sharon Matola, the keeper at the zoo, nursed her back to health. Every year, a birthday party was held to celebrate April's birthday. In 2008 the party was attended by Belize Minister of State, Elvin Penner. In 2012, April was given four birthday cakes made out of horse chow, honey, cucumbers and flowers. April died on 31 October 2013. She was 30 years old at the time of her death.
