= Saw palm =

Saw palm may refer to:

- Acoelorraphe wrightii
- Serenoa repens
