= List of endemic species of Belize =

List of some endemic flora and fauna species of Belize.

== Fauna ==
- Citheracanthus meermani
- Cyllopsis wellingi
- Epigomphus maya
- Erpetegomphus leptophis
- Metriopelma gutzkei
- Poecilia teresae
- Rana juliani
- Reichlingia annae
- Rhamdia typhla

== Flora ==
- Ageratum radicans
- Amyris rhomboidea
- Anemia bartlettii
- Axonopus ciliatifolius
- Calyptranthes bartlettii
- Calyptranthes cuneifolia
- Coccoloba lundellii
- Crossopetalum gentlei
- Dalechampia schippii
- Dioscorea sandwithii
- Dorstenia belizensis
- Eugenia rufidula
- Galactia anomala
- Gymnanthes belizensis
- Hypericum aphyllum
- Koanophyllon sorensenii
- Laubertia gentlei
- Louteridium chartaceum
- Metastelma stenomeres
- Miconia ochroleuca
- Mimosa pinetorum
- Neurolaena schippii
- Oxandra proctorii
- Paepalanthus belizensis
- Paepalanthus gentlei
- Paspalum peckii
- Passiflora urbaniana
- Piper schippianum
- Pisonia proctorii
- Pithecellobium peckii
- Plinia peroblata
- Schippia concolor
- Scutellaria lundellii
- Syngonanthus bartlettii
- Syngonanthus hondurensis
- Syngonanthus lundellianus
- Syngonanthus oneillii
- Telanthophora bartlettii
- Thelypteris schippii
- Zamia prasina
- Zinowiewia pallida

== See also ==
- Fauna of Belize
- Flora of Belize
