= Flora of Belize =

Plants endemic to Belize

The flora of Belize is highly diverse by regional standards, given the country's small geographical extent. Situated on the Caribbean coast of northern Central America the flora and vegetation have been intimately intertwined with Belize's history. The nation itself grew out of British timber extraction activities from the 17th century onwards, at first for logwood (Haematoxylum campechianum) and later for mahogany (Swietenia macrophylla), fondly called "red gold" because of its high cost and was much sought after by European aristocracy. Central America generally is thought to have gained much of it characteristic flora during the "Great American interchange" during which time South American elements migrated north after the geological closure of the isthmus of Panama. Few Amazonian elements penetrate as far north as Belize and in species composition the forests of Belize are most similar to the forests of the Petén (Guatemala) and the Yucatán (Mexico).

== Vegetation types ==
The vegetation of Belize was first systematically surveyed in the 1930s. Recent mapping projects have employed the following principal terrestrial and coastal categories of native vegetation:

- lowland broad-leaved forest. This is a diverse forest type in Belize, now greatly reduced in extent by clearance for agricultural land. It includes such tropical tree species as Simarouba glauca, Calophyllum brasiliense, Terminalia amazonia and Pterocarpus officinalis.

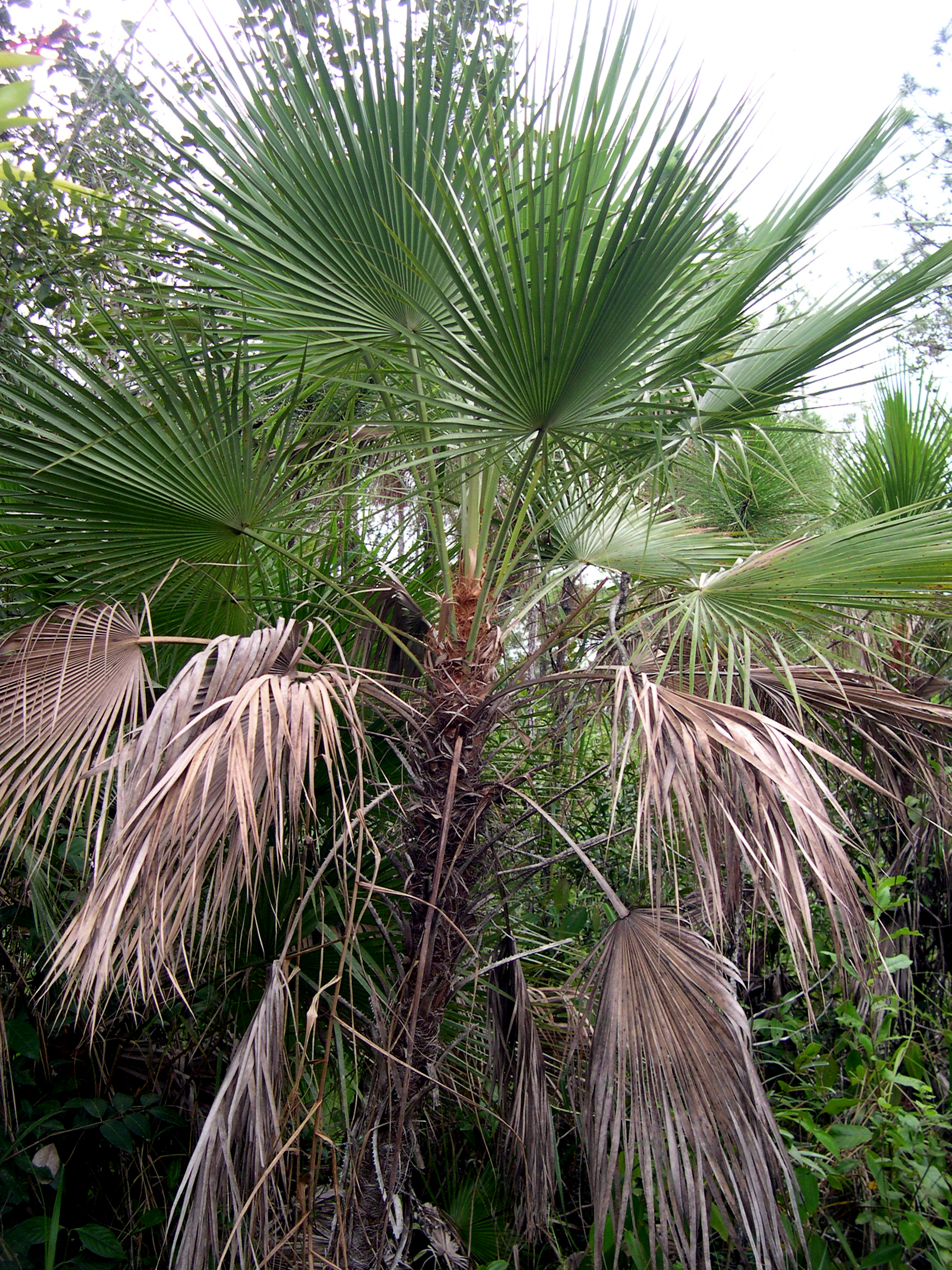
Acoelorraphe wrightii, savanna palmetto.

- lowland savanna. This is an important vegetation type in northern Belize, in which scattered trees occur in "short grass" (actually mainly sedges). Savanna is maintained as open vegetation by a combination of wet-season flooding, dry-season drought and fire. Typical trees include: Acoelorraphe wrightii, Quercus oleoides and madre de cacao Gliricidia sepium.
- lowland pine forest or pine savanna (open forest mainly composed of Pinus caribaea var. hondurensis with shrubs such as the rough-leaved "sandpaper tree" (Curatella americana).

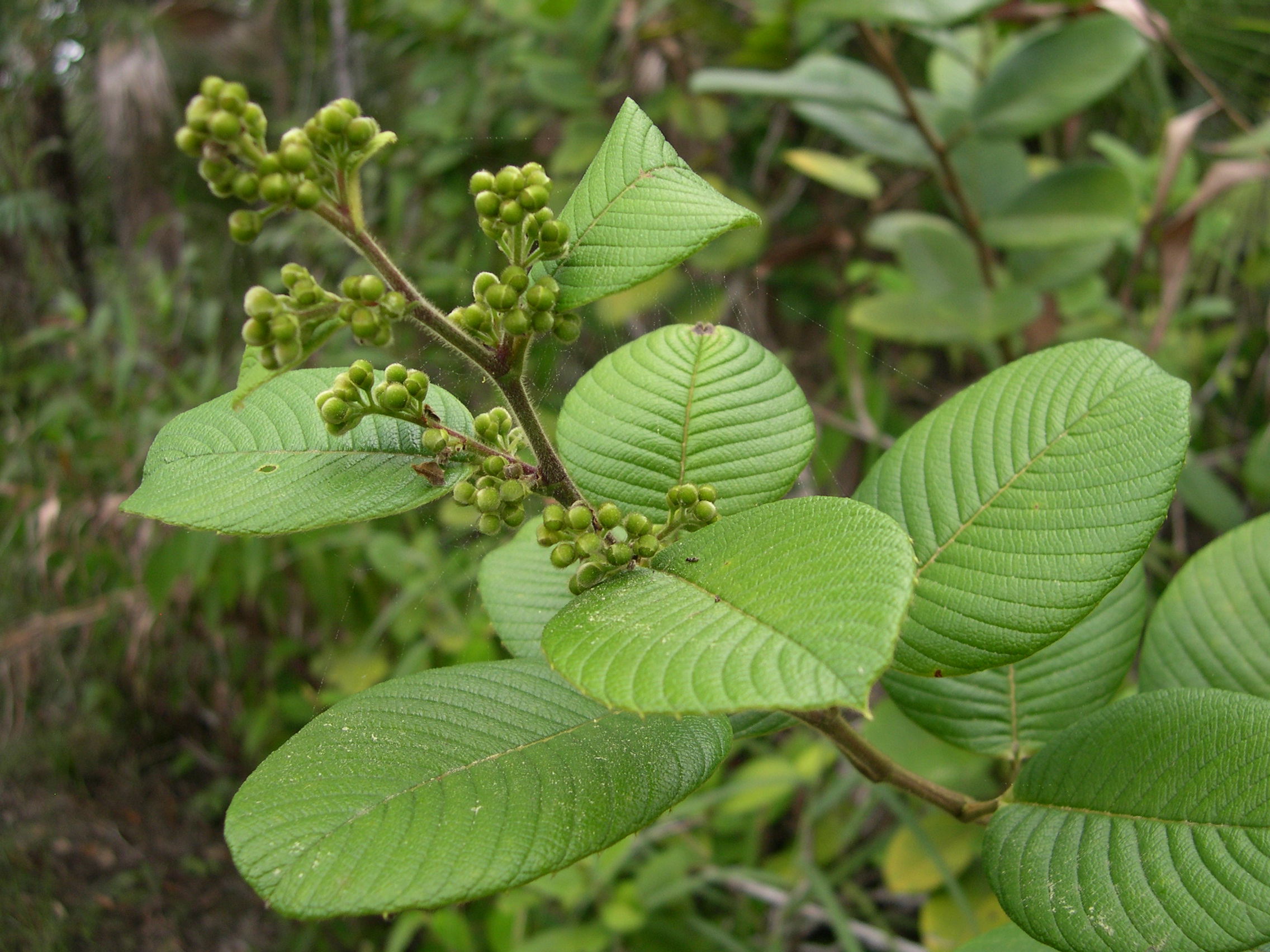
Curatella americana, the sandpaper tree of the pine forest.

- submontane pine forest (with Pinus ayacahuite, Pinus oocarpa and Pinus rudis together with some broadleaved species)
- submontane broadleaved forest. Characteristic vegetation of the Maya Mountain massif above 500m. Typical species include Podocarpus guatemalensis, Swietenia macrophylla, Terminalia amazonia, Virola brachycarpa, and the palm Astrocaryum mexicanum.
- mangrove and littoral forest. Ecologically important vegetation type of the coastal cayes. Several species of mangrove are involved including: red mangrove (Rhizophora mangle), black mangrove (Avicennia germinans) and white mangrove (Laguncularia racemosa). In addition the buttonwood (Conocarpus erectus) although not a true mangrove is often associated with mangroves in littoral forest. Also see the section on mangroves below.
- seagrass beds. Sandy bays often have extensive mats of seagrass. There are several different types in Belize: turtle grass (Thalassia testudinum in the Hydrocharitaceae), manatee seagrass (Syringodium filiforme in the Cymodoceaceae), duckweed seagrasses (Halodule spp in the Cymodoceaceae).
- riparian shrubland. This is a mixed vegetation type, of shrubs and small trees with grasses and sedges, found along watercourses. Typical species include Schizolobium and Ceiba pentandra. Loss of this habitat was one of the particular environmental concerns of building the Chalillo Dam on the Macal river.

== Plant conservation and forest reserves ==
Although deforestation continues to be a threat to Belize's natural environment - and to the natural environment of almost all countries in Latin America - much of the native forest remains, facilitating a burgeoning ecotourism sector. The National Parks System Act of 1981 declared numerous protected areas, and the Belizean Government has been working with a prominent non-governmental organization (NGO), the Belize Audubon Society (BAS) to promote nature conservation within the country. Founded in 1969, the BAS assists the Forest Department of the Government of Belize to manage several important forest areas including:

- Cockscomb Basin Wildlife Sanctuary - established in 1990 as a result of the studies of the biology of the jaguar by Alan Rabinowitz. Although initially established for jaguar conservation it is very important for plant conservation.
- Guanacaste National park - approximately fifty acres of tropical forest reserve in the Cayo District of Belize. The signature tree of the reserve is the Guanacaste (Enterolobium cyclocarpum) of which several giant specimens may be found.
- Tapir Mountain Nature Reserve - a forest reserve of 6,750 acres (27 km^{2}), in the Maya Mountains with rugged (karst) relief and relatively undisturbed subtropical moist forest.

In addition to the above there are numerous other important forest reserves such as:

- Chiquibul Forest Reserve (CFR)

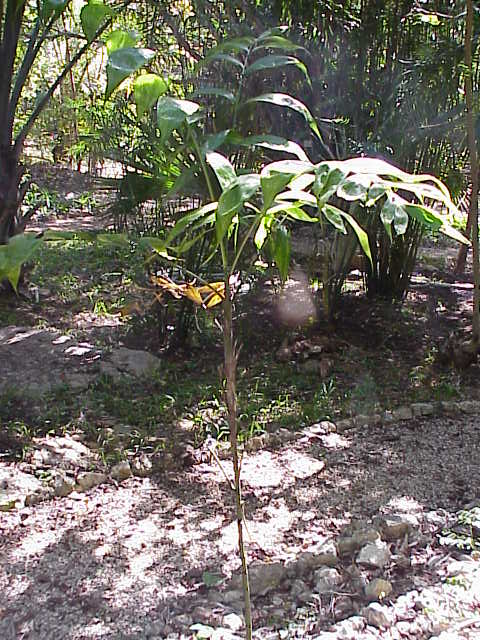
Chamaedorea oblongata, understorey palm.

There are numerous conservation challenges in Belize. One is the extensive recent illegal cutting of the understorey palm's xate (Chamaedorea spp.). This has a severe effect on the health and reproduction of these characteristic understorey components.

== Forests and Deforestation ==
A remote sensing study conducted by the Water Center for the Humid Tropics of Latin America and the Caribbean (CATHALAC) and NASA, in collaboration with the Forest Department and the Land Information Centre (LIC) of the Government of Belize's Ministry of Natural Resources and the Environment (MNRE), and published in August 2010 revealed that Belize's forest cover in early 2010 was approximately 62.7%, down from 75.9% in late 1980.

A similar study by Belize Tropical Forest Studies and Conservation International revealed similar trends in terms of Belize's forest cover. Both studies indicate that each year, 0.6% of Belize's forest cover is lost, translating to the clearing of an average of 24,835 acres (9,982 hectares) each year. The USAID-supported SERVIR study by CATHALAC, NASA, and the MNRE also showed that Belize's protected areas have been extremely effective in protecting the country's forests. While some 6.4% of forests inside of legally declared protected areas were cleared between 1980 and 2010, over a quarter of forests outside of protected areas had been lost between 1980 and 2010. As a country with a relatively high forest cover and a low deforestation rate, Belize has significant potential for participation in initiatives such as REDD.

Belize had a 2018 Forest Landscape Integrity Index mean score of 6.15/10, ranking it 85th globally out of 172 countries.

=== Tree cover extent and loss ===
Global Forest Watch publishes annual estimates of tree cover loss and 2000 tree cover extent derived from time-series analysis of Landsat satellite imagery in the Global Forest Change dataset. In this framework, tree cover refers to vegetation taller than 5 m (including natural forests and tree plantations), and tree cover loss is defined as the complete removal of tree cover canopy for a given year, regardless of cause.

For Belize, country statistics report cumulative tree cover loss of 336,685 ha (3,366.85 km^{2}) from 2001 to 2024 (about 19.2% of its 2000 tree cover area). For tree cover density greater than 30%, country statistics report a 2000 tree cover extent of 1,755,302 ha (17,553.02 km^{2}). The charts and table below display this data. In simple terms, the annual loss number is the area where tree cover disappeared in that year, and the extent number shows what remains of the 2000 tree cover baseline after subtracting cumulative loss. Forest regrowth is not included in the dataset.

Annual tree cover loss in Belize, 2001–2024. View chart definition.
Tree cover extent in 2000 minus cumulative tree cover loss in Belize, 2001–2024 (loss-only residual; does not account for gain). View chart definition.

Annual tree cover extent and loss
Year	Tree cover extent (km2) (Note: This residual measure does not include forest regrowth.)	Annual tree cover loss (km2)
2001	17,470.64	82.38
2002	17,335.91	134.73
2003	17,267.52	68.39
2004	17,224.13	43.39
2005	17,142.98	81.15
2006	17,100.17	42.81
2007	16,977.07	123.10
2008	16,894.23	82.84
2009	16,791.26	102.97
2010	16,692.86	98.40
2011	16,428.95	263.91
2012	16,313.09	115.86
2013	16,149.06	164.03
2014	15,983.97	165.09
2015	15,860.94	123.03
2016	15,654.72	206.22
2017	15,490.26	164.46
2018	15,378.63	111.63
2019	15,194.26	184.37
2020	14,927.04	267.22
2021	14,833.93	93.11
2022	14,751.92	82.01
2023	14,526.18	225.74
2024	14,186.17	340.01

== Mangroves ==
While many consider mangrove to be one of Belize's various forest classes, it is important to point out that in Belize, mangroves assume the form of not only forest (dominated by closed formations of mangroves of over 3m tall) but also scrub (dominated by formations of dwarf mangroves below 3m in height), and savanna (areas with scattered mangroves). Because of their importance for shoreline protection and maintenance of fisheries stocks, Belize's mangroves are legally protected under the Forests Act of the Laws of Belize.

A recent study by the World Resources Institute (WRI) indicates that Belize's mangrove ecosystems contribute US $174–249 million per year to the national economy. The clearing of mangroves for development of coastal infrastructure has been recognized as a threat to Belize's mangroves and led to public perception that destruction of mangrove ecosystems was rampant, such as an investigative study in 2008 which indicated unauthorized clearings within the South Water Caye Marine Reserve, and which eventually led to the Belize Barrier Reef System's designation by UNESCO as an endangered World Heritage Site.

With uncertainty regarding actual rates of clearing of Belize's mangrove ecosystems, a recent study funded by the World Wildlife Fund (WWF) has clarified the situation, making use of Landsat satellite imagery to comprehensively examine Belize's mangrove cover. That study, which spanned the thirty years from 1980–2010 and was based on the earlier work of mangrove researcher Simon Zisman, was conducted by the Water Center for the Humid Tropics of Latin America and the Caribbean (CATHALAC) and found that in 2010, mangroves covered some 184,548 acres (74,684 hectares) or 3.4% of Belize's territory. By contrast, it is estimated that in 1980 mangrove cover stood at 188,417 acres (76,250 hectares) - also 3.4% of Belize's territory. Based on Zisman, it is also estimated that Belize's mangrove cover in 1980 represented 98.7% of the pre-colonial extent of those ecosystems. Belize's mangrove cover in 2010 was thus estimated to represent 96.7% of the pre-colonial cover. Where the 2010 update of the World Mangrove Atlas also indicated that a fifth of the world's mangrove ecosystems have been lost since 1980, the case of Belize's mangroves thus stands in stark contrast to the global picture.

Belize's relative mangrove cover declined by 2% from 1980–2010, and in that period, under 4,000 acres of mangroves had been cleared, although clearing of mangroves near Belize's main coastal settlements (e.g. Belize City and San Pedro) was relatively high. The rate of loss of Belize's mangroves - at 0.07% per year between 1980 and 2010 - was much lower than Belize's overall rate of forest clearing (0.6% per year between 1980 and 2010).

== Trees ==
As well as logwood (Haematoxylon campechianum) and mahogany (Swietenia macrophylla) two other important Belizean timber trees of note are the Santa Maria (Calophyllum antillanum) and cedar (Cedrela mexicana). Other economically important trees include cotton tree or kapok (Ceiba pentandra), and cacao (Theobroma cacao). Chicle (Manilkara chicle) is the original chewing gum (made from its gummy sap).

== Orchids ==
Belize has a rich array (some 300 species) of native orchids including Encyclia cochleata var. cochleata, the so-called "black orchid". This is the national flower of Belize.

== Palms ==
Belizean vegetation is characterized by numerous species of palms including the palmettos of the savanna, silver palmetto (Schippia concolor), palmetto (Acoelorraphe wrightii) and the common coconut palm (Cocos nucifera) found in coastal areas. Other important palms include the cohune palms, cohune (Attalea cohune) and warree cohune (Astrocaryum mexicanum), as well as the give and take palm (Chrysophila argentea), xate palms (Chamaedorea elegans and Chamaedorea oblongata), pokenoboy (Bactris major), basket tie-tie (Desmoncus schippii) and royal palm (Roystonea oleracea).

== See also ==
- List of endemic species of Belize
