= Belize Bird Rescue =

Avian rescue and rehabilitation centre in Belize

- Abbreviation: BBR
- Formation: 2004; 22 years ago Belmopan, Belize
- Type: Non-governmental organization
- Purpose: Avian rescue and rehabilitation centre
- Headquarters: Belmopan, Belize
- Coordinates: 17.2465°N 88.801617°W
- Region served: Belize
- Executive Director: Nikki Buxton
- Key people: Oscar Valle
- Budget: US$125,000 (2021)
- Staff: 5 (2017)
- Volunteers: 8 (2023)
- Website: belizebirdrescue.org

Belize Bird Rescue (BBR) is an avian rescue and rehabilitation centre in Belize.

It is a non-governmental and non-profit organization, and is Belize's only multi-species avian rescue and rehabilitation centre. It operates wholly within Belize under license and support from the Government of Belize Forest Department. The main focus of the organisation is the rehabilitation for release of wild-caught psittacines (parrots) liberated from the illegal local pet trade. As of July 2017, Belize Bird Rescue has returned almost 1000 ex-captive parrots to the wild. Additionally, the organisation rescues and rehabilitates injured and orphaned resident and migratory birds of all species, and provides sanctuary or long-term care for non-releasable birds.

BBR works in close cooperation with the Government of Belize Forest Department and with other NGOs and non-profit organisations in Belize including the Toledo Institute for Development and Environment, Programme for Belize, Belize Bird Conservancy and the Belize Audubon Society.

BBR's work includes the rehabilitation of parrots, songbirds, raptors and waterbirds for release. The centre's facilities include multiple specialist and species-specific aviaries, a medical clinic, nurseries and quarantine facilities and food preparation rooms.

== History ==
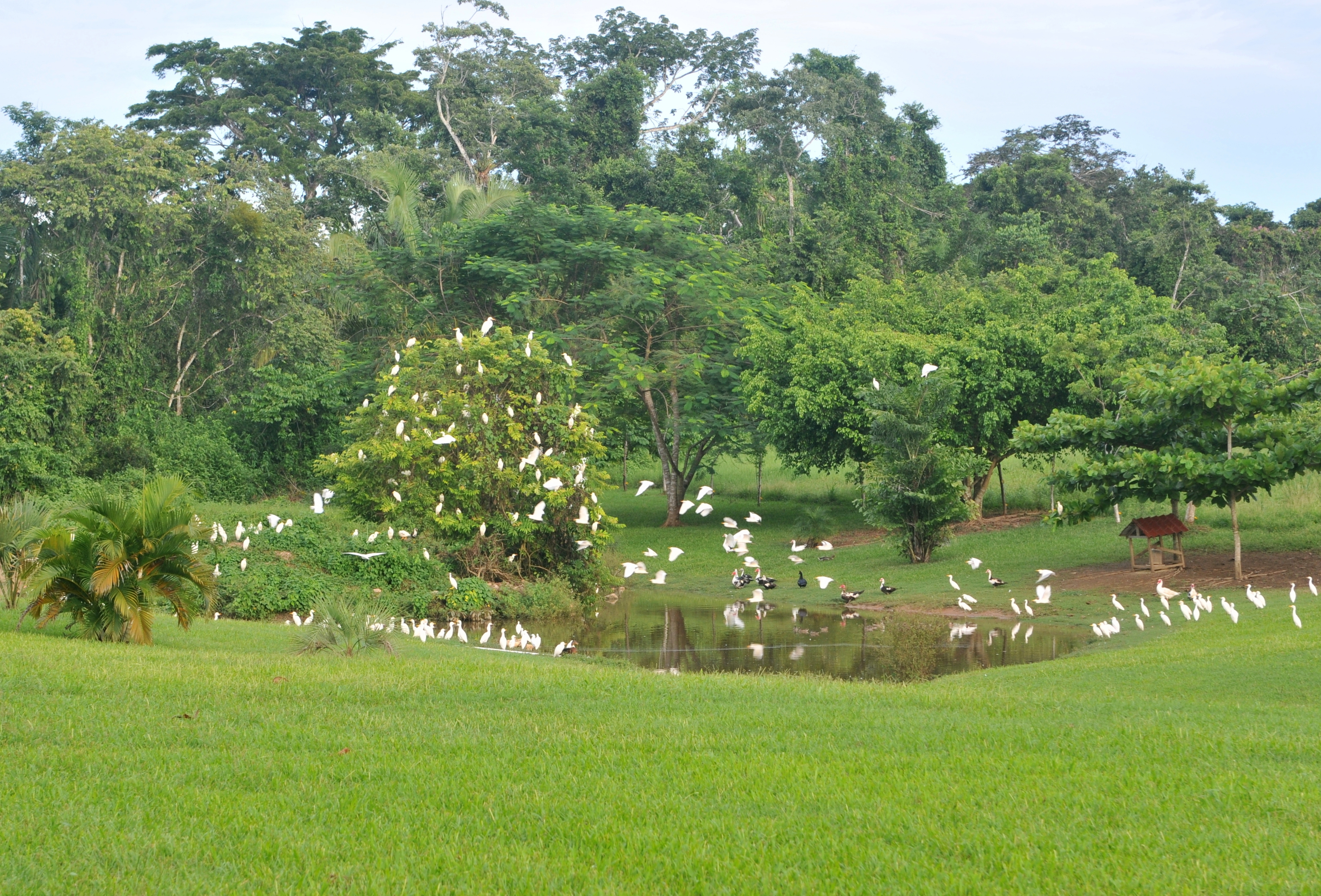
Pond with egrets at Belize Bird Rescue

=== Origins ===
BBR was founded in 2004 and is located in the capital city of Belmopan. Its founding directors realised a need to assist the Belize Forest Department in providing a rehabilitation centre for confiscated or surrendered avian wildlife during the enforcement of the wildlife laws. The basis of the organisation was to care for and rehabilitate wild-caught psittacines, but became a multi-species rescue centre over the years out of necessity.

The organisation was incorporated as a registered non-profit company in Belize in 2014, and received non-governmental organisation status in 2015.

=== Funding ===
BBR was initially funded by its founders. Following the award of NGO status in 2015, BBR is funded by private donations, crowd-funding and grants. The annual operating budget is approximately US$125,000.

== Priorities and campaigns ==
=== Forest Department licence programme ===
A programme for licensing parrots already in captivity was devised by BBR in conjunction with the Belize Forest Department to provide a mechanism for parrots already in captivity to remain legally with their owners, provided that minimum standards of husbandry and care were followed.

=== Rehabilitation facility ===
BBR's facility for the long-term care and rehabilitation of confiscated birds allows the Belize Forest Department to enforce the Wildlife Protection Act.

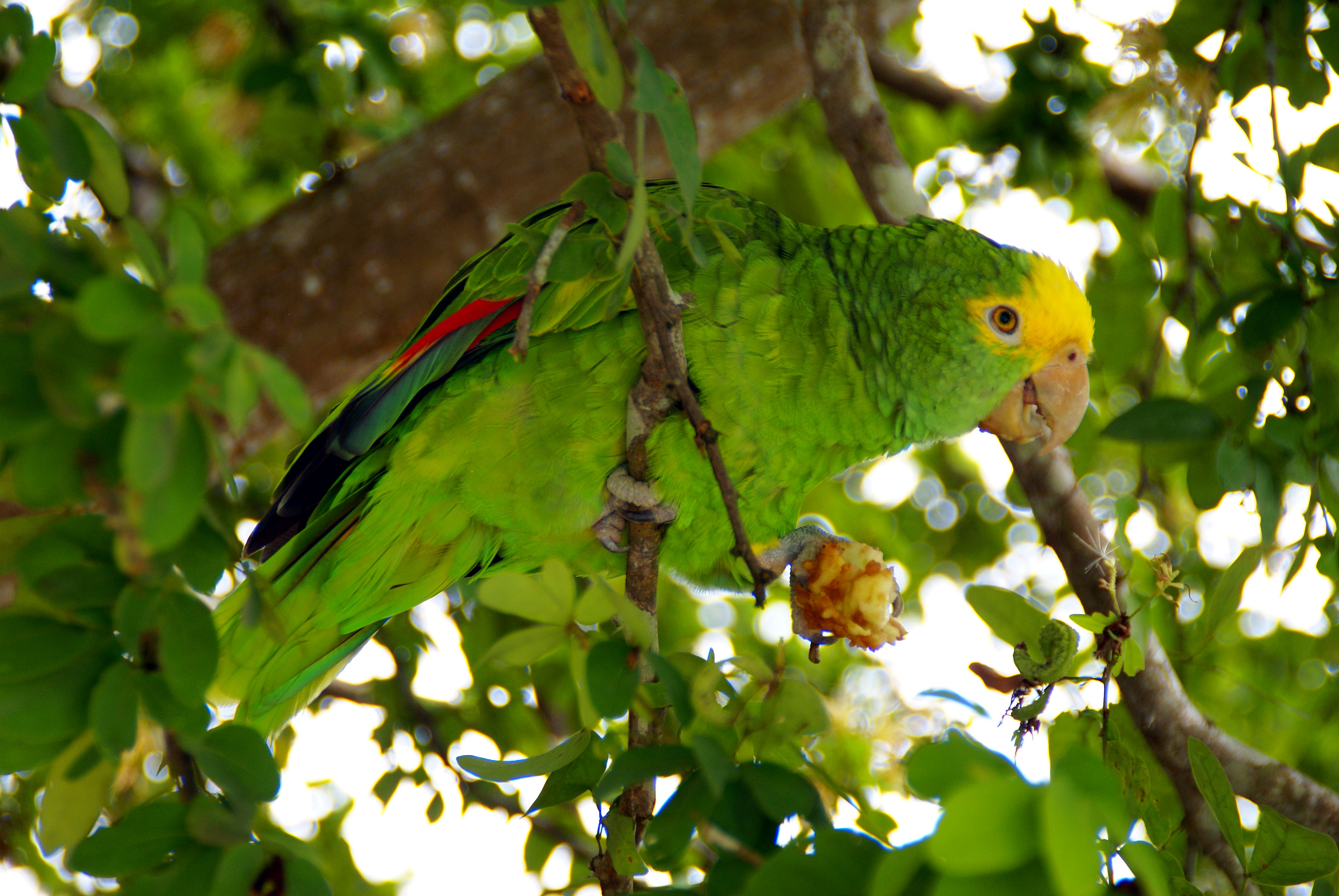
Yellow-headed amazon (Amazona oratrix)

=== Yellow-head hand-rearing project ===
Endangered yellow-headed amazon (Amazona oratrix belizensis) chicks are removed from nests that are sick or injured, in overcrowded nests or in danger of being poached or predated, or suffer from exposure or nest destabilisation. They are hand-reared at the rescue centre until fledged and independent and then soft-released back into monitored and protected release sites to coincide with the following breeding season.

=== Education and public awareness ===
The organisation employs several awareness strategies including educational presentations, community outreach programmes, publications, exhibitions and advertising.

== See also ==
- Conservation in Belize
- List of birds of Belize
- List of protected areas of Belize
- Wildlife of Belize
