= Sharon Matola =

Belizean environmentalist (1954–2021)

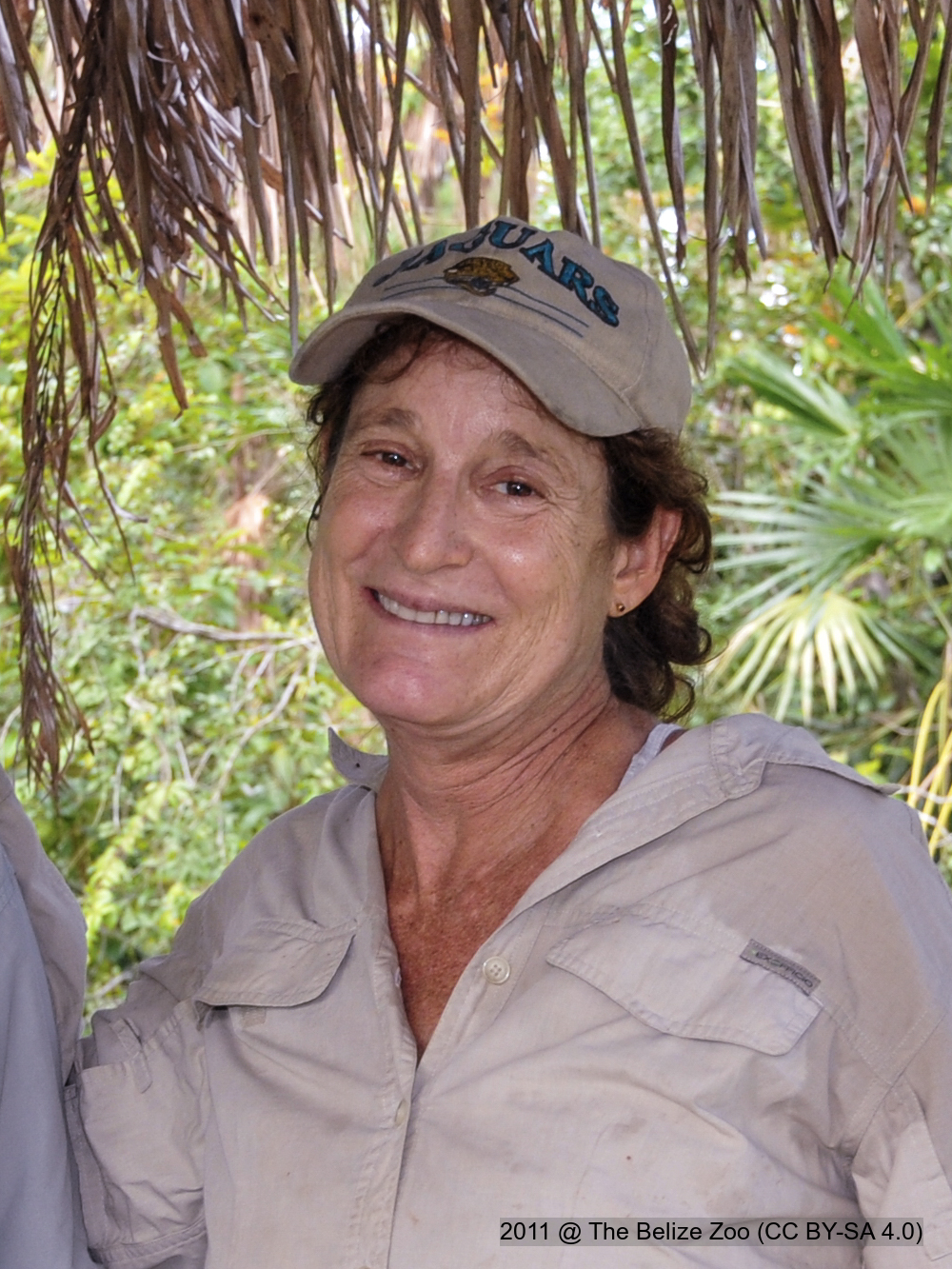
- Sharon Matola at the Belize Zoo on July 20, 2011.
- Born: June 3, 1954; Baltimore, Maryland
- Died: March 21, 2021 (aged 66); Belmopan, Belize
- Occupations: Biologist, zookeeper
- Years active: 1983–2021
- Known for: Conservation
- Notable work: Founder of Belize Zoo

Sharon Matola (June 3, 1954 – March 21, 2021) was an American-born Belizean biologist, environmentalist, and zookeeper. She was the founding director of the Belize Zoo and Tropical Education Center, a zoo which was started in 1983 to protect native animals that had been used in a documentary film in Belize. Matola graduated from New College of Florida in 1981 with a degree in biology.

== Early life ==
Matola was born in Baltimore, Maryland, on June 3, 1954. Her father was a sales manager for the National Brewing Company and her mother was an administrative assistant. She showed great interest in animals and concern for their welfare from an early age.

After graduating from high school, Matola enlisted in the United States Air Force, in which she received jungle survival training. She then studied Russian at the University of Iowa before transferring to the New College of Florida in Sarasota, Florida, from which she received a bachelor's degree in biology in 1981; while at the college, she studied fish taxonomy during a trip to Belize. After college, she became an assistant lion tamer at the Circus Hall of Fame before attending graduate school to study mycology. She left graduate school for a job as an exotic dancer in a traveling circus in Mexico, hoping to do biological field work during the day before dancing at night.

== Belize Zoo ==
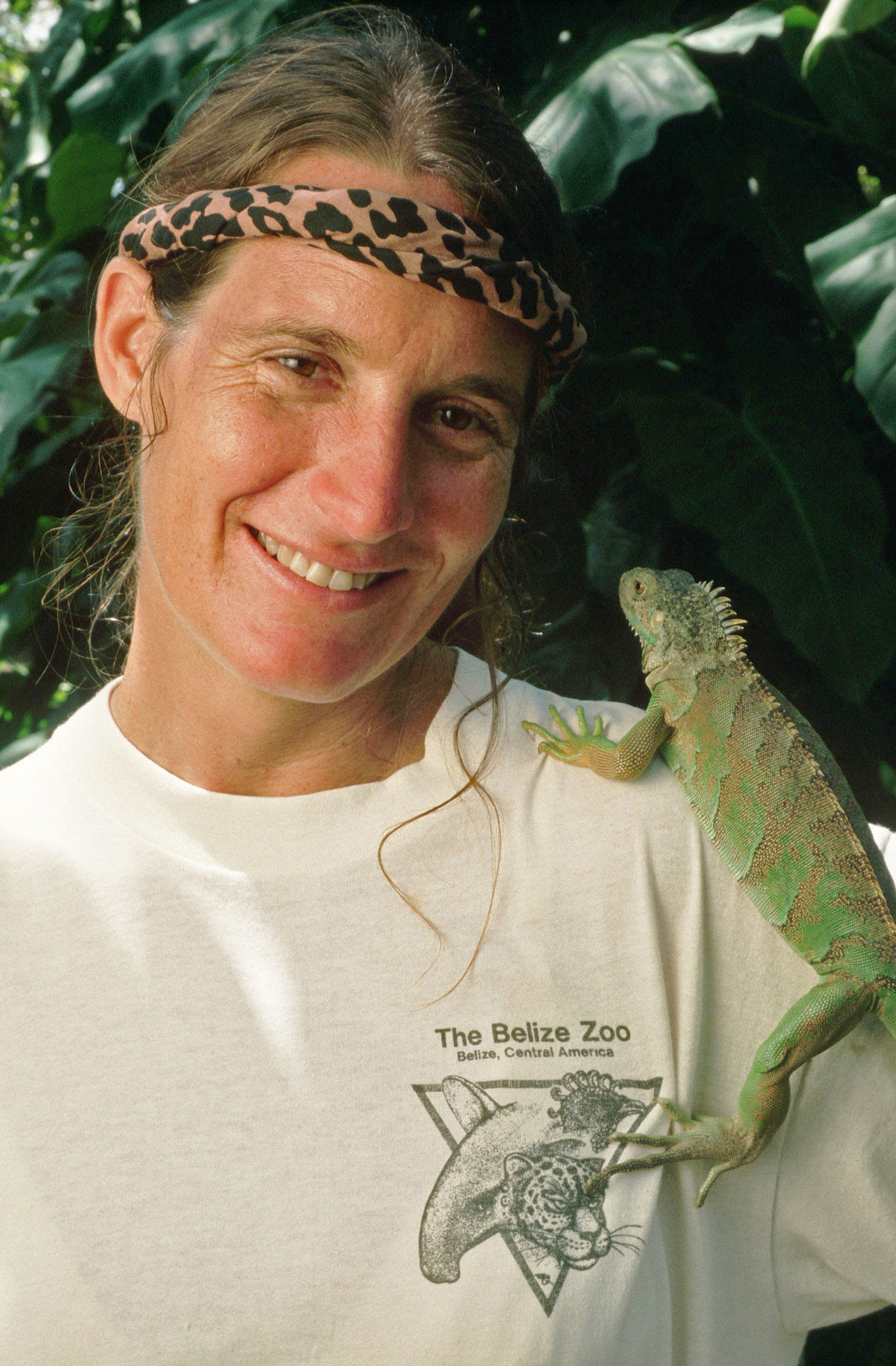
Matola in 1988

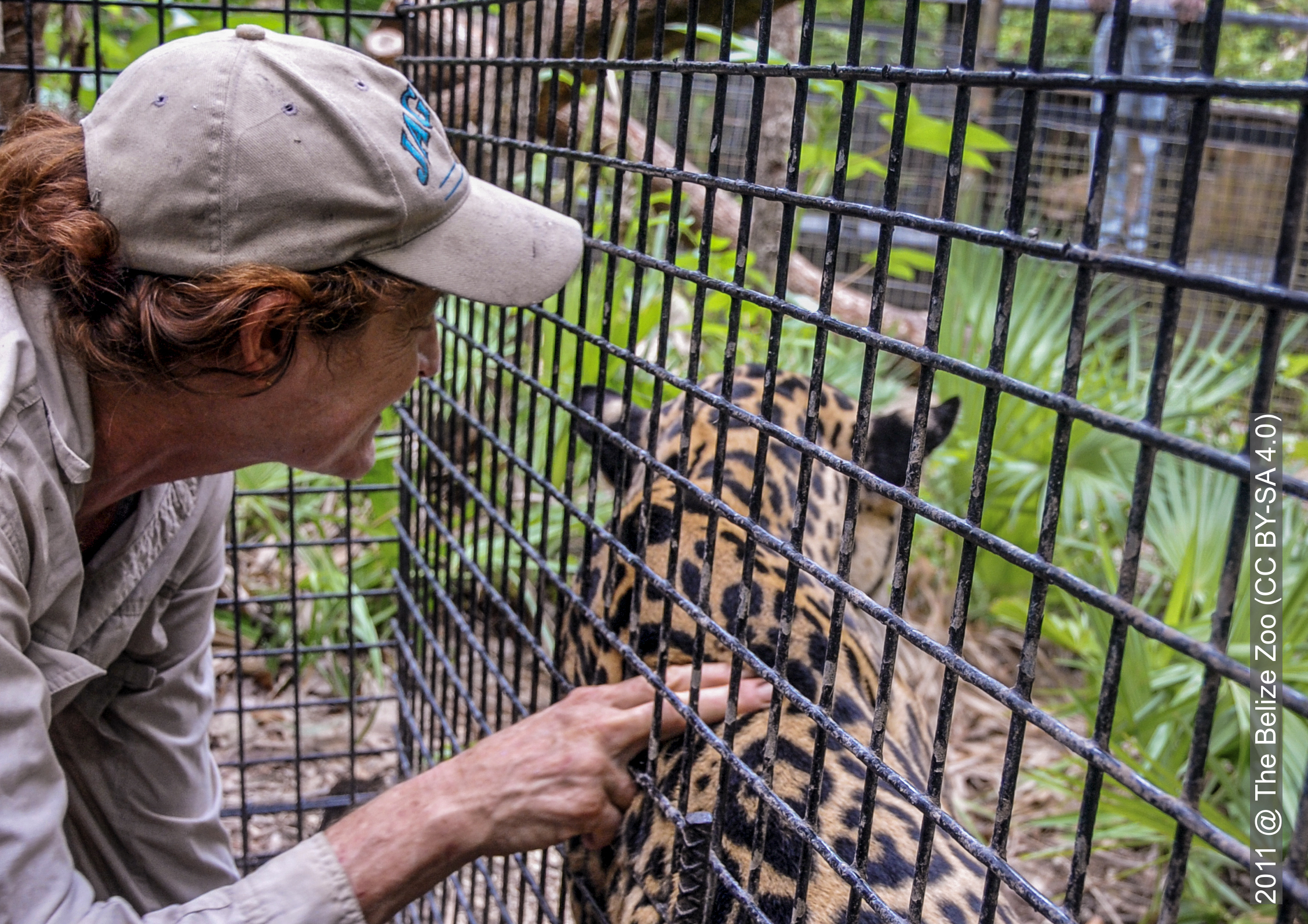
Matola hosted unforgettable encounters with Junior Buddy that transformed people's attitudes about jaguars. Above, Matola and Junior Buddy on July 20, 2011.

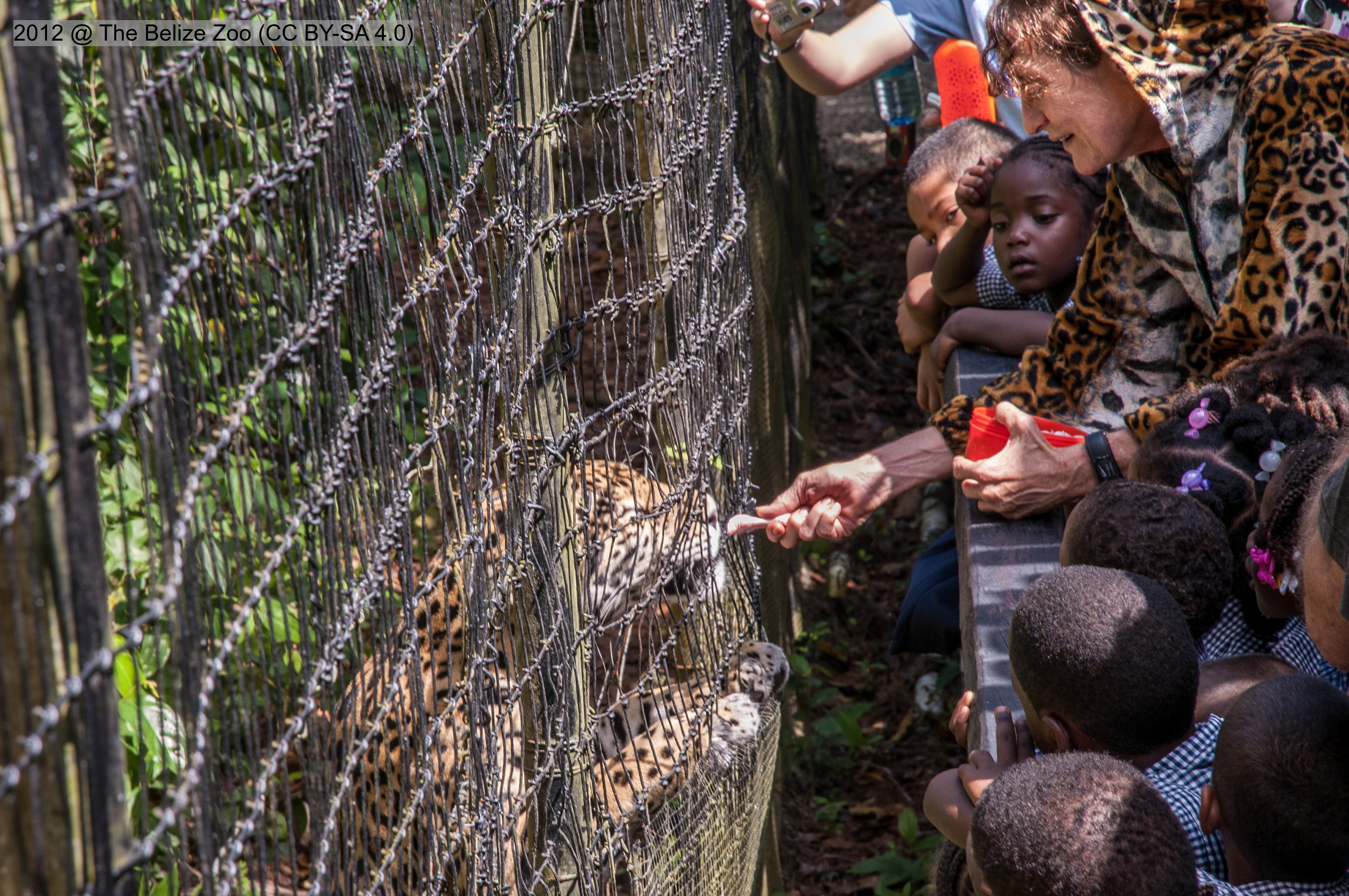
Matola with children at Junior Buddy's fifth birthday celebration at the Belize Zoo in 2012.

Matola's job in Mexico brought her to the attention of filmmaker Richard Foster, who hired her in 1982 to care for 20 animals being used in the making of a wildlife documentary film. When shooting of the film was completed, she was left to decide how to dispose of the animals, by then habituated to humans and unsuited to release into the wild. On a whim, she decided to care for the animals by starting the Belize Zoo, hung signs out on the road, asked a nearby restaurant to coax patrons into visiting the zoo, and waited to see who would show up. She soon realized that what Belizeans knew about Belizean wildlife at the time was often more myth than fact and that they were unaware that damage to the Belizean rainforest threatened the populations of Belizean animals. With the blessing of the Government of Belize, which could not offer financial support, she began raising money from environmental groups to build and support the zoo.

By 1996 the zoo was home to over 125 native species. Singer-songwriter Jimmy Buffett and actor Harrison Ford became supporters of the zoo. Before the COVID-19 pandemic struck in 2020, the zoo drew 75,000 visitors a year, half of them Belizeans, and in March 2021 the zoo housed 190 animals representing 45 species native to Belize, including the tapir, jaguar, spider monkey, coati, scarlet macaw, jabiru stork, and two species of crocodile. The zoo's staff numbered 58 people before the pandemic struck, but dropped to 32 by March 2021 as the pandemic raged.

Thanks to her work at the zoo, Matola became known as the "Jane Goodall of jaguars" and the "Jane Goodall of Belize." The zoo eventually was renamed the Belize Zoo and Tropical Education Center, reflecting its mission of teaching people about Belize's wildlife.

== Other work ==
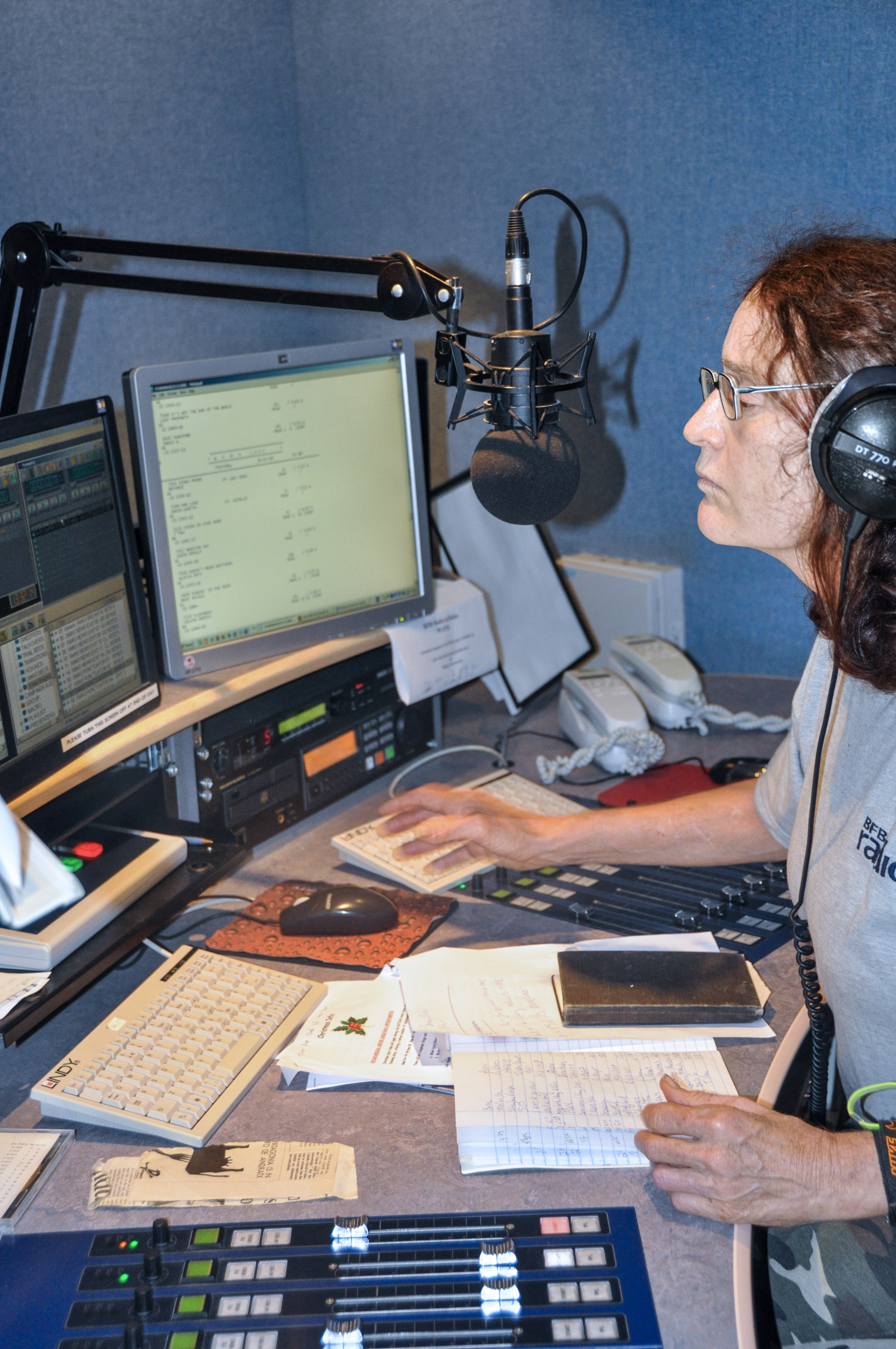
Matola hosts her radio show at Airport Camp, ca. 2009.

Matola served as a consultant for the filming of the 1986 movie The Mosquito Coast, bringing her and the Belize Zoo to the attention of Harrison Ford and prompting him to become a supporter.

Matola fought unsuccessfully to stop Belize's Chalillo Dam project; the dam was constructed between 2002 and 2005. Her struggle was documented in the 2008 book The Last Flight of the Scarlet Macaw: One Woman's Fight to Save the World's Most Beautiful Bird by Bruce Barcott.

Matola began to contribute to BFBS Radio in Belize in 1992, starting with a popular wildlife series called Walk on the Wildside, in which she explored the lives of Belize's flora and fauna. She also had a weekly rock and roll radio show that she broadcast from Airport Camp — the home base for British Army Training and Support Unit Belize (BATSUB), in Ladyville, Belize — until August 2011, when the government of the United Kingdom closed the camp.

Matola wrote children's books centering around the character Hoodwink the Owl.

== Personal life ==
Matola's marriage to Jack Schreier ended in divorce. She had no children. She became a naturalized Belizean citizen, and lived on the zoo's property. She said that her favorite animal was the harpy eagle.

== Death ==
Matola died of a heart attack at a hospital in Belmopan, Belize, on March 21, 2021, at the age of 66.

== In media ==
"The Reef...and the Rainforest," a 1992 episode of the PBS television series Return to the Sea, includes an interview with Matola and footage of the Belize Zoo.
