= Belize Zoo =

Coordinates: 17°21′17.77″N 88°33′13.88″W

The Belize Zoo and Tropical Education Center
- The logo depicts Belize's most iconic animals: keel-billed toucan, Baird's tapir and jaguar

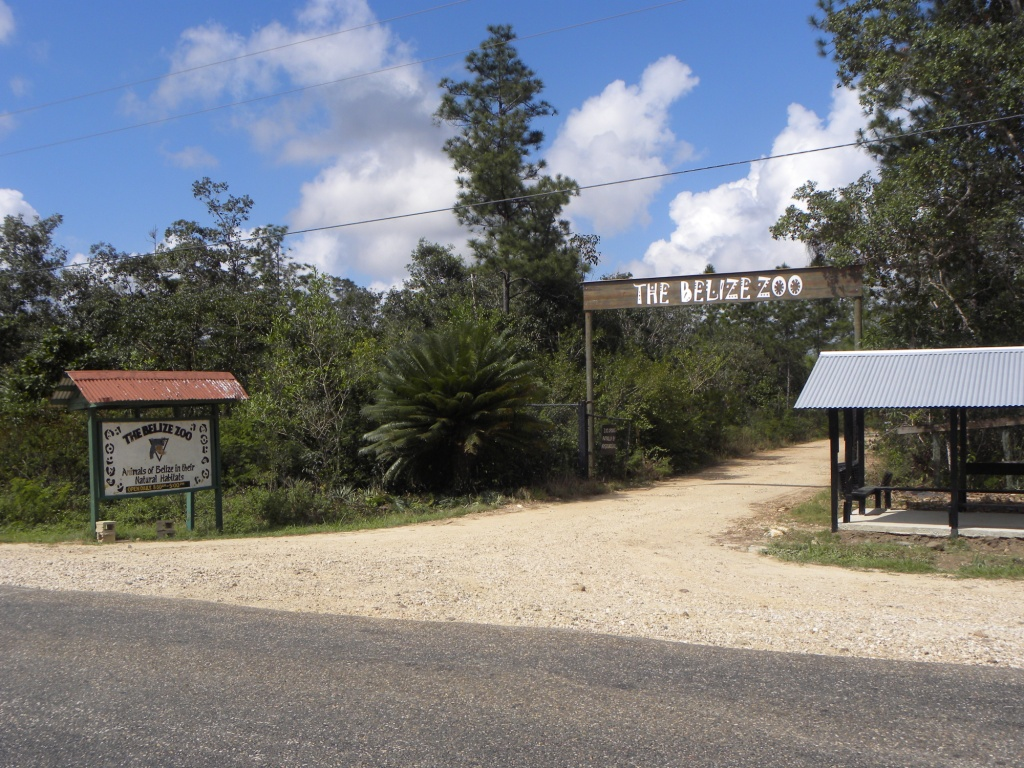
- Entrance of the Belize Zoo
- Interactive map of The Belize Zoo and Tropical Education Center
- Date opened: 1983; 1991 in current location
- Location: Mile 29, Western Highway, Belize
- Land area: 12 ha (29 acres)
- No. of animals: 125
- No. of species: 48
- Website: www.belizezoo.org

The Belize Zoo and Tropical Education Center is a zoo in Belize, located some 47 kilometres (29 mi) west of Belize City on the Western Highway. Set in 12 hectares (29 acres), the zoo was founded in 1983 by Sharon Matola. It is home to more than 175 animals of about 48 species, all native to Belize. The natural environment of Belize is left entirely intact within the zoo. The dense, natural vegetation is separated only by gravel trails through the forest. The Belize Zoo and Tropical Education Center receives over 68,000 visitors annually, with 15,000 being students, teachers, and parents.

The Belize Zoo focuses on educating visitors about the wildlife of Belize through encountering the animals in their natural habitat. The aim is to instill appreciation and pride, and a desire to protect and conserve Belize's natural resources. The zoo was the recipient of Belize Tourism Board's 9th National Tourism Award, "Educational Award of the Year" in 2009.

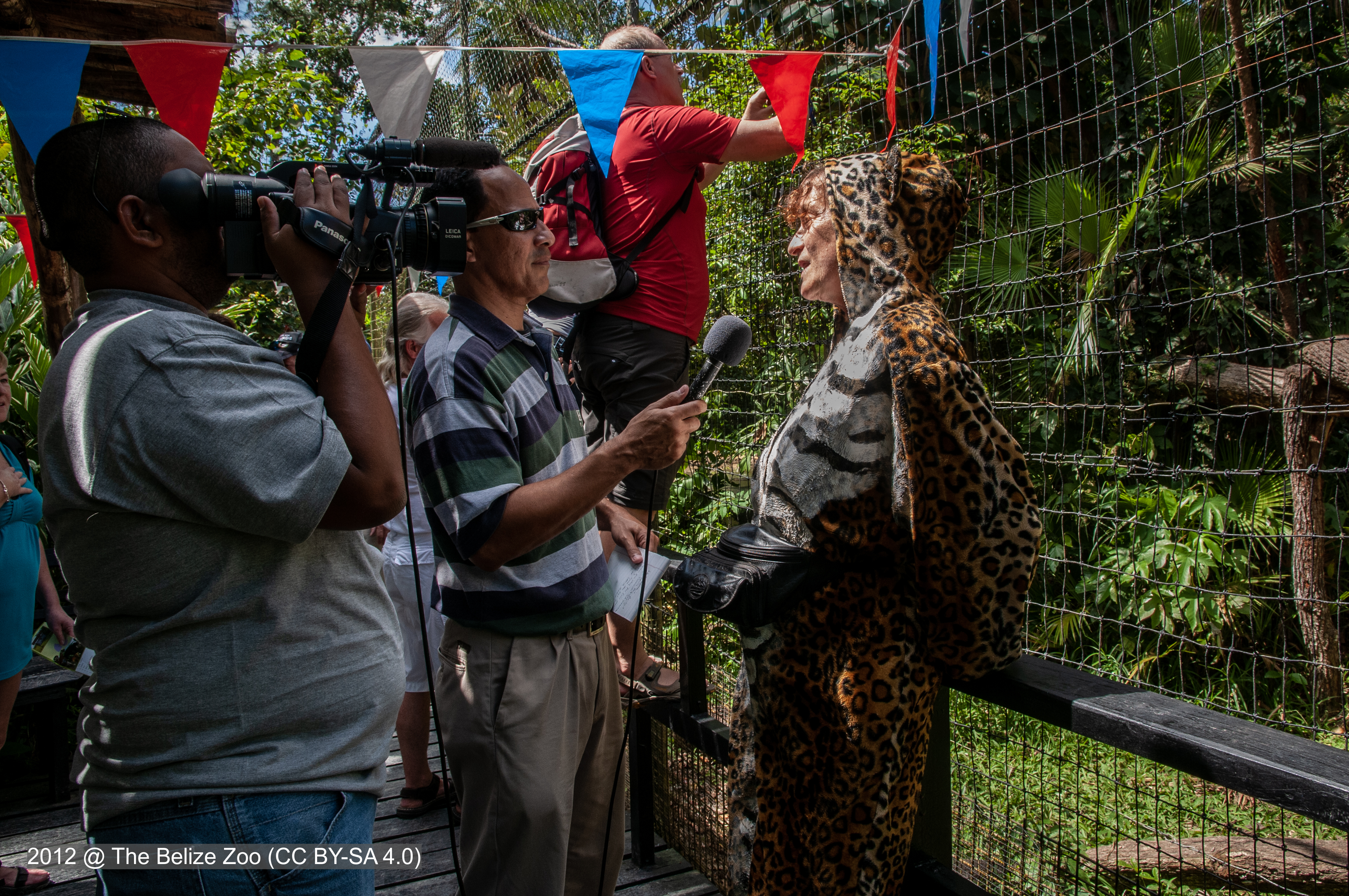
Sharon Matola interviewed at Junior Buddy's 5th Birthday Celebration at The Belize Zoo, 2012-02-21

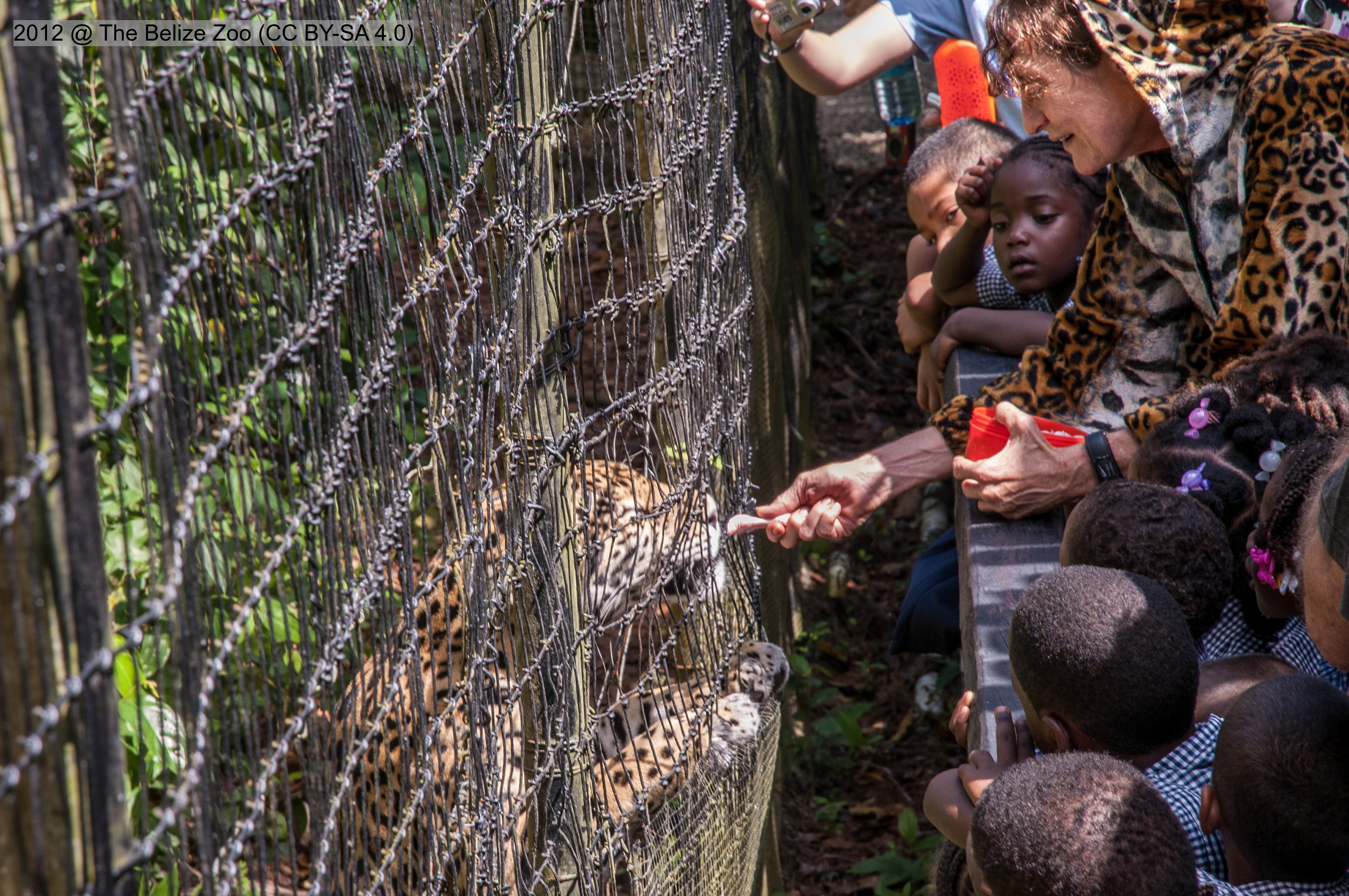
Sharon Matola with children at Junior Buddy's 5th Birthday Celebration at The Belize Zoo, 2012-02-21

== History ==
In 1983, a film making team, headed by cinematographer Richard Foster (who later became a resident of Belize), came to Belize to create a documentary titled Selva Verde (Spanish for "green forest"). Sharon Matola accompanied the crew as an assistant and animal caretaker. At the end of filming, funds were exhausted, and there was debate over what to do with the now tame animals. Releasing them into the wild was out of the question, and animal euthanasia seemed too extreme. When the filming crew left, Matola remained with the 17 animals (an ocelot, a puma, a jaguar and several exotic birds), and started a makeshift zoo, using the animals' enclosures as exhibits, to generate funding for their care.

It became apparent that Belizeans were largely unfamiliar with the native animals of Belize, and had many misconceptions and superstitions about them. The zoo's focus then shifted to educating residents and visitors alike about the native wildlife of Belize. After garnering local support and both local and foreign donations, the zoo was relocated to its present 12-hectare (29-acre) site in 1991.

The Belize Zoo is currently home to more than 175 individuals of 48 species native to Belize. Keeping to its goal of bringing visitors closer to Belize's natural heritage, the zoo only houses native animals. No zoo animal has ever been taken from the wild. Zoo residents were either people's pets, donated to the zoo, injured and brought in for healing and rehabilitation, born at the zoo, or sent to the zoo from another zoological facility.

== Animals ==
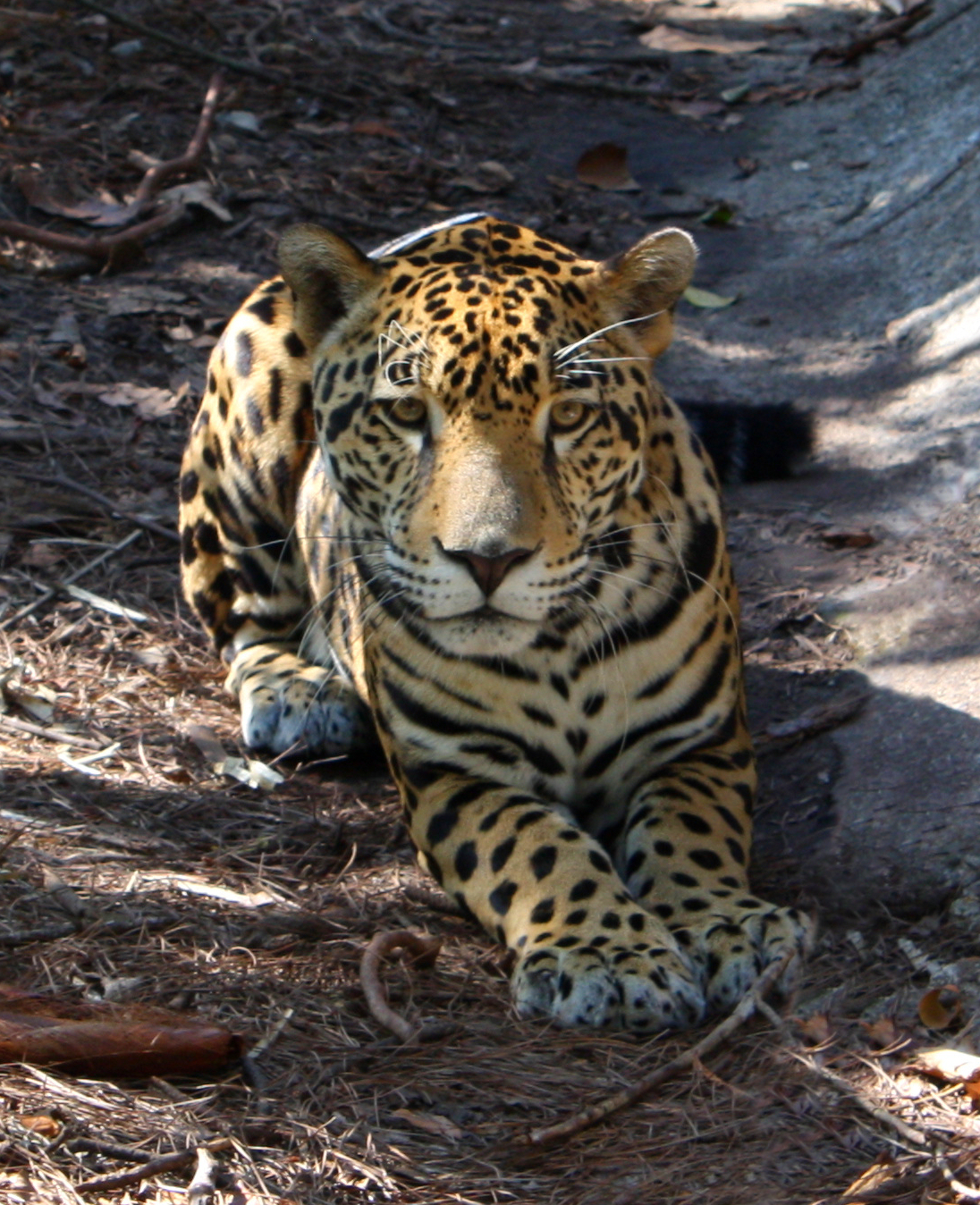
Junior the jaguar

Mammals

The Belize Zoo is home to a variety of mammals, including Belize's national animal, the Baird's tapir, and the five wildcat species found in Belize: (jaguar, puma, ocelot, margay, and jaguarundi). Other mammals include white-tailed deer, red brocket deer, collared peccaries, white-lipped peccaries, Yucatan spider monkeys, black howler monkeys, Central American agoutis, lowland paca, gray foxes, neotropical otters, coatimundi, kinkajous and tayras.

Birds

The zoo features several species of parrots, owls, and raptors, as well as a wetland aviary. Birds at the zoo include scarlet macaws, red-lored amazons, yellow-headed amazons, keel-billed toucans, jabiru, harpy eagles, king vultures, great black hawks, ornate hawk-eagles, barn owls, mottled owls, crested guans and great curassows.

Reptiles

Reptiles at the zoo include American crocodiles, Morelet's crocodiles, boa constrictors, fer-de-lance, green iguanas and black spiny-tailed iguanas.

== Animal encounters ==
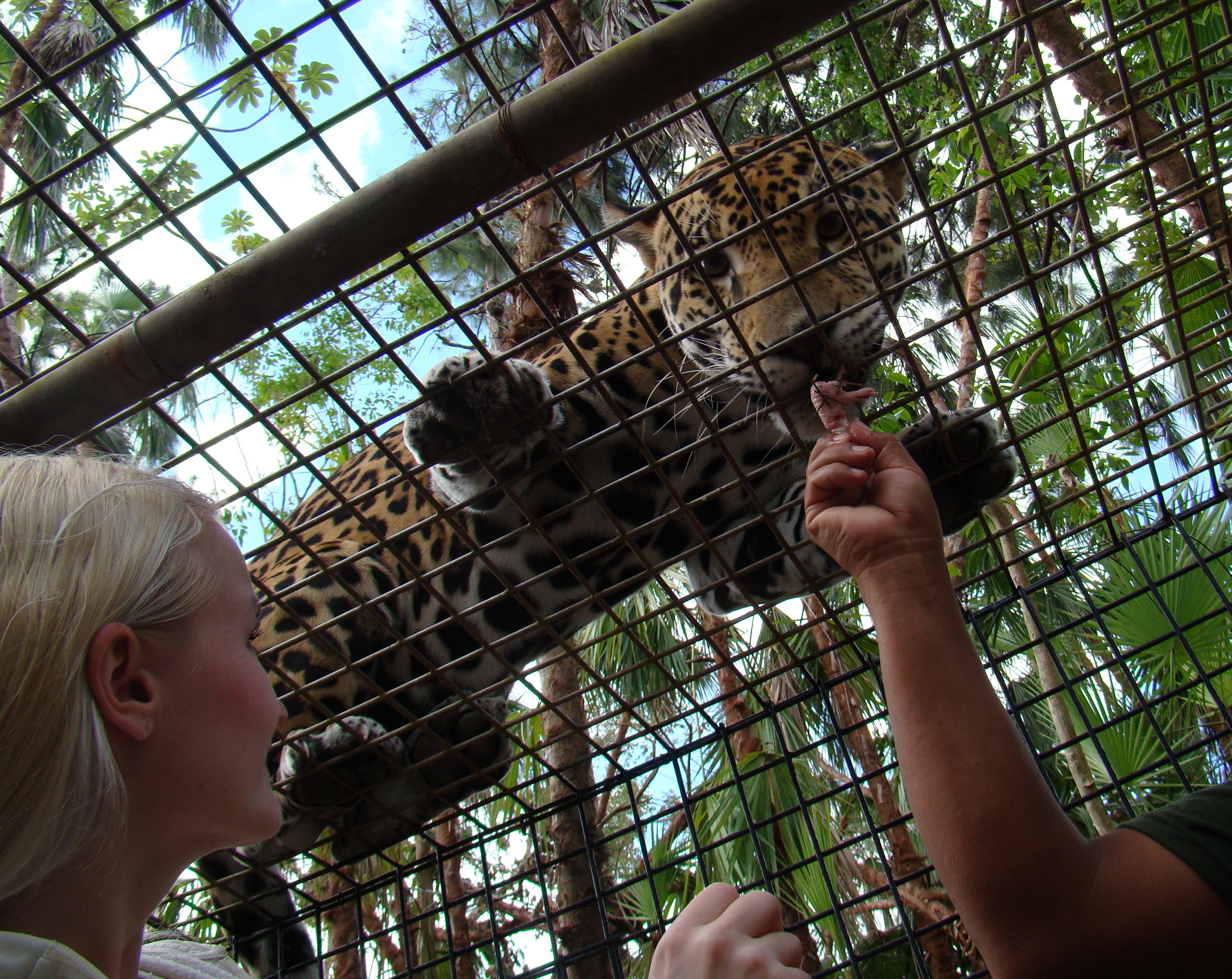
Close jaguar encounter in the Belize Zoo

Nocturnal Tour

Apart from the traditional day time tour of the zoo, visitors are able to arrange night tours of the zoo, to see activity of the crepuscular and nocturnal animals. The animals on the tour include the tapirs, jaguars, margays, kinkajous, crocodiles, peccaries and howler monkeys.

Junior Buddy encounter

"Junior Buddy" is a young jaguar born and raised in the Belize Zoo. A result of the Problem Jaguar Rehab Program (his mother was a rescued problem jaguar), Junior has been trained to perform several tricks in return for snacks, a form of positive reinforcement training. Visitors have the opportunity to safely enter a cage, within Junior's exhibit, to encounter him on a more personal level. The goal is to promote the appreciation and respect for the jaguar species.

Junior's story has been made into a children's book, to be published and released by Scholastic Corporation, released in October 2010.

Scarlet macaw encounter

Boa encounter

== Conservation ==
=== Tapirs ===
The Belize Zoo is headquarters for the Tapir Specialist Group of the International Union for Conservation of Nature (IUCN).

=== Harpy Eagle Restoration Program ===
The zoo released its 14th harpy eagle back to the wild in 2009.

=== Problem Jaguar Rehabilitation Program ===
The zoo runs a ‘problem jaguar’ rehabilitation programme which has around 10 jaguars who are part of this; this is aimed to educate the local peoples about jaguars and reduce the conflict between local farmers and jaguars which may prey upon their livestock. A "Problem Jaguar" had repeatedly preyed upon livestock or domestic animals and are almost always older, injured, or sick, and thus unable to compete with other healthy individuals for food and territory.

== In media ==
- "The Reef...and the Rainforest," a 1992 episode of the PBS television series Return to the Sea, includes an interview with Sharon Matola and footage of the Belize Zoo.
- In 2022, the zoo appeared on the thirteenth episode of The Amazing Race Australia 6.

== See also ==
- April (tapir)
