= Hypericum aphyllum =

Scientific classification
- Kingdom: Plantae
- Clade: Tracheophytes
- Clade: Angiosperms
- Clade: Eudicots
- Clade: Rosids
- Order: Malpighiales
- Family: Hypericaceae
- Genus: Hypericum
- Section: H. sect. Trigynobrathys
- Species: H. aphyllum

Binomial name
- Hypericum aphyllum Lundell

Synonyms
- Sarothra aphylla (Lundell) Lundell

Species of flowering plant

Hypericum aphyllum is a species of flowering plant in the family Hypericaceae. This annual herb reaches 0.4-0.65 meters in height. It is endemic to the Toledo District, Belize.
