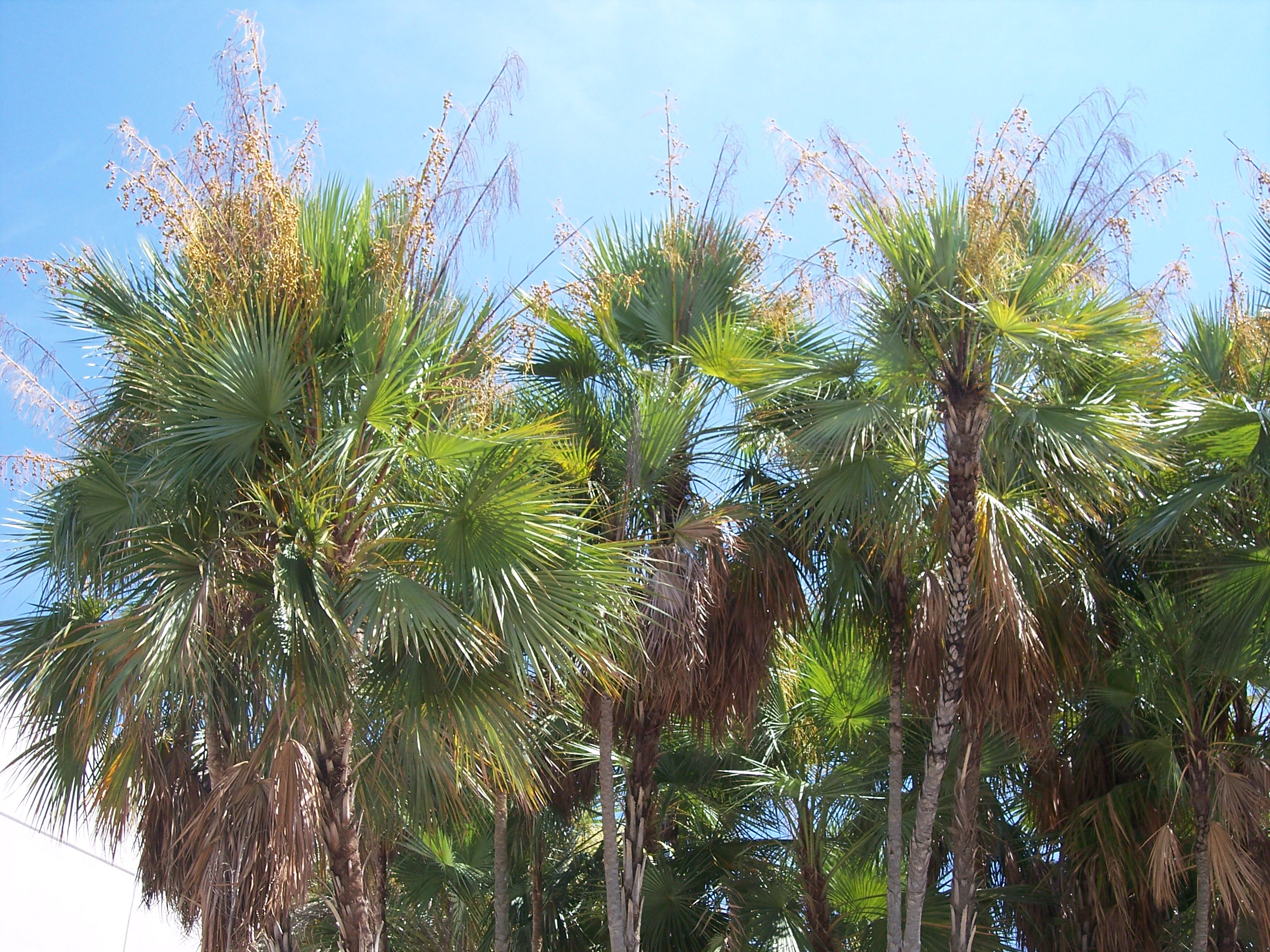
- Stand of fruiting specimens

Conservation status
- Apparently Secure (NatureServe)

- Least Concern (IUCN 3.1)

Scientific classification
- Kingdom: Plantae
- Clade: Embryophytes
- Clade: Tracheophytes
- Clade: Spermatophytes
- Clade: Angiosperms
- Clade: Monocots
- Clade: Commelinids
- Order: Arecales
- Family: Arecaceae
- Subfamily: Coryphoideae
- Tribe: Trachycarpeae
- Genus: Acoelorraphe; H.Wendl.
- Species: A. wrightii

Binomial name
- Acoelorraphe wrightii (Griseb. & H.Wendl.) H.Wendl. ex Becc.

Synonyms
- Of the genus: Acanthosabal Prosch.; Acoelorhaphe, orth. var.; Acoelorrhaphe, orth. var.; Paurotis O.F.Cook; Of the species: Acanthosabal caespitosa Prosch.; Acoelorraphe arborescens (Sarg.) Becc.; Acoelorraphe pinetorum Bartlett; Acoelorraphe wrightii var. novogeronensis Becc.; Brahea psilocalyx Burret; Copernicia wrightii Griseb. & H.Wendl.; Paurotis androsana O.F.Cook; Paurotis arborescens (Sarg.) O.F.Cook; Paurotis psilocalyx (Burret) Lundell; Paurotis schippii Burret; Paurotis wrightii (Griseb. & H.Wendl.) Britton; Serenoa arborescens Sarg.

= Acoelorraphe =

Genus of palms

Acoelorraphe is a genus of palms with a single species Acoelorraphe wrightii, known as the Paurotis palm, Everglades palm or Madeira palm in English and cubas, tique, and papta in Spanish. The genus name is sometimes spelt as Acoelorrhaphe or Acoelorhaphe, which are treated as orthographical variants by the International Plant Names Index.

== Description ==
It is a small to moderately tall palm that grows in clusters to 5–7 metres (16–23 ft), rarely 9 m (30 ft) tall, with slender stems less than 15 centimetres (5.9 in) diameter. The leaves are palmate (fan-shaped), with segments joined to each other for about half of their length, and are 1–2 m (3.3–6.6 ft) wide, light-green above, and silver underneath. The leaf petiole is 1–1.2 m (3.3–3.9 ft) long, and has orange, curved, sharp teeth along the edges. The flowers are minute, inconspicuous and greenish, with 6 stamens. The trunk is covered with fibrous matting. The fruit is pea-sized, starting orange and turning to black at maturity.

== Taxonomy ==
The genus name is a combination of three Greek words meaning a- 'without', koilos 'hollow', and rhaphis 'needle', an allusion to the form of the fruit. The species is named after the American botanist Charles Wright.

== Distribution and habitat ==
It is native to Central America, southeastern Mexico, the Caribbean, Colombia, the Bahamas, and extreme southern Florida where it grows close to sea level in thin, rocky soil over limestone in wet areas and swamps of the Everglades.

== Cultivation and uses ==
The Paurotis palm was formerly plentiful in the Florida Everglades, but many plants were taken for the nursery trade. The palm is now protected in the wild by Florida law and its numbers are increasing again. Trees propagated from seed or by sawing apart the base of a cluster are available in nurseries. It is hardy to central and southern Florida and is cultivated as a landscape palm.

== Gallery ==
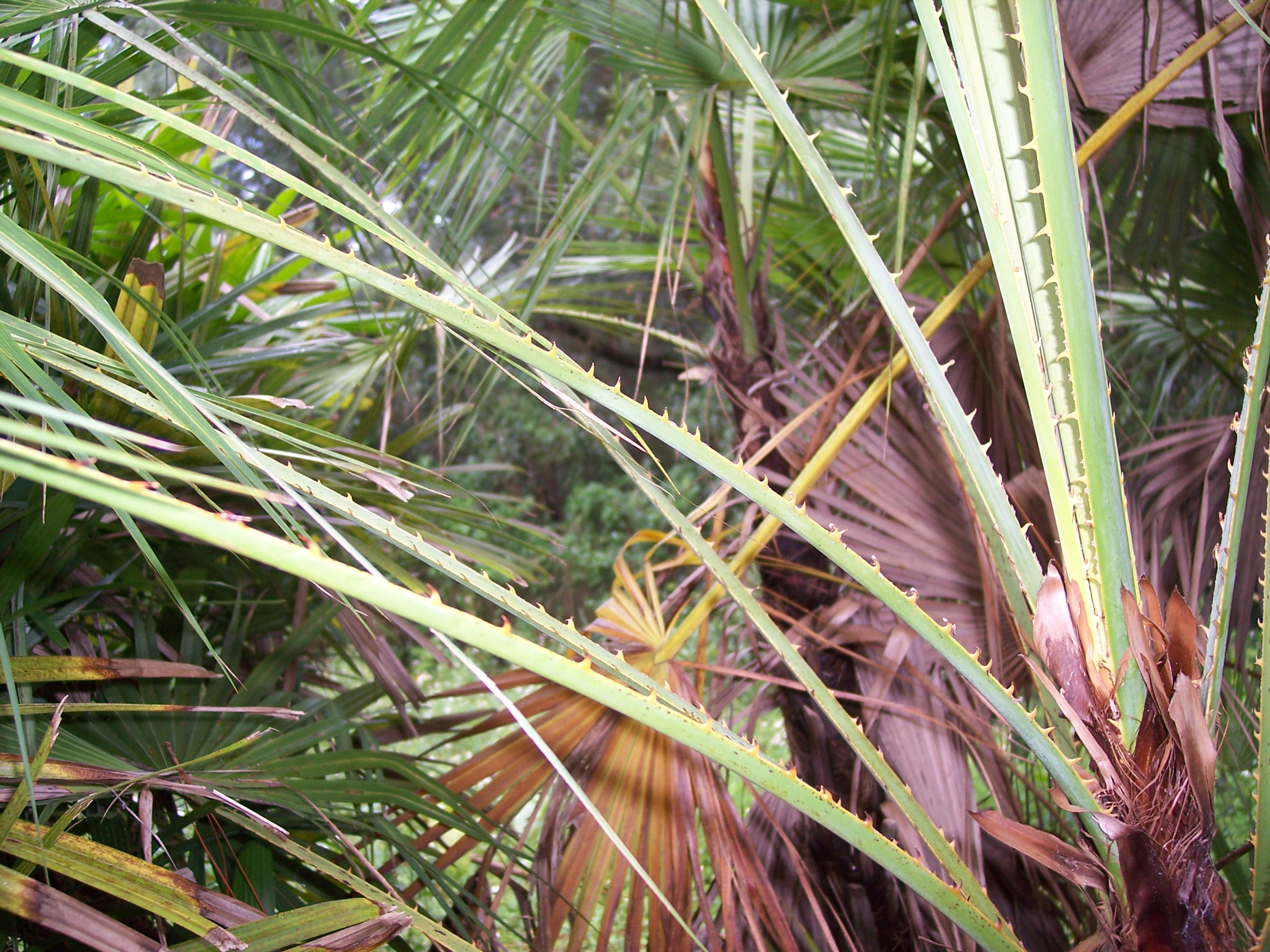
Petiole spines

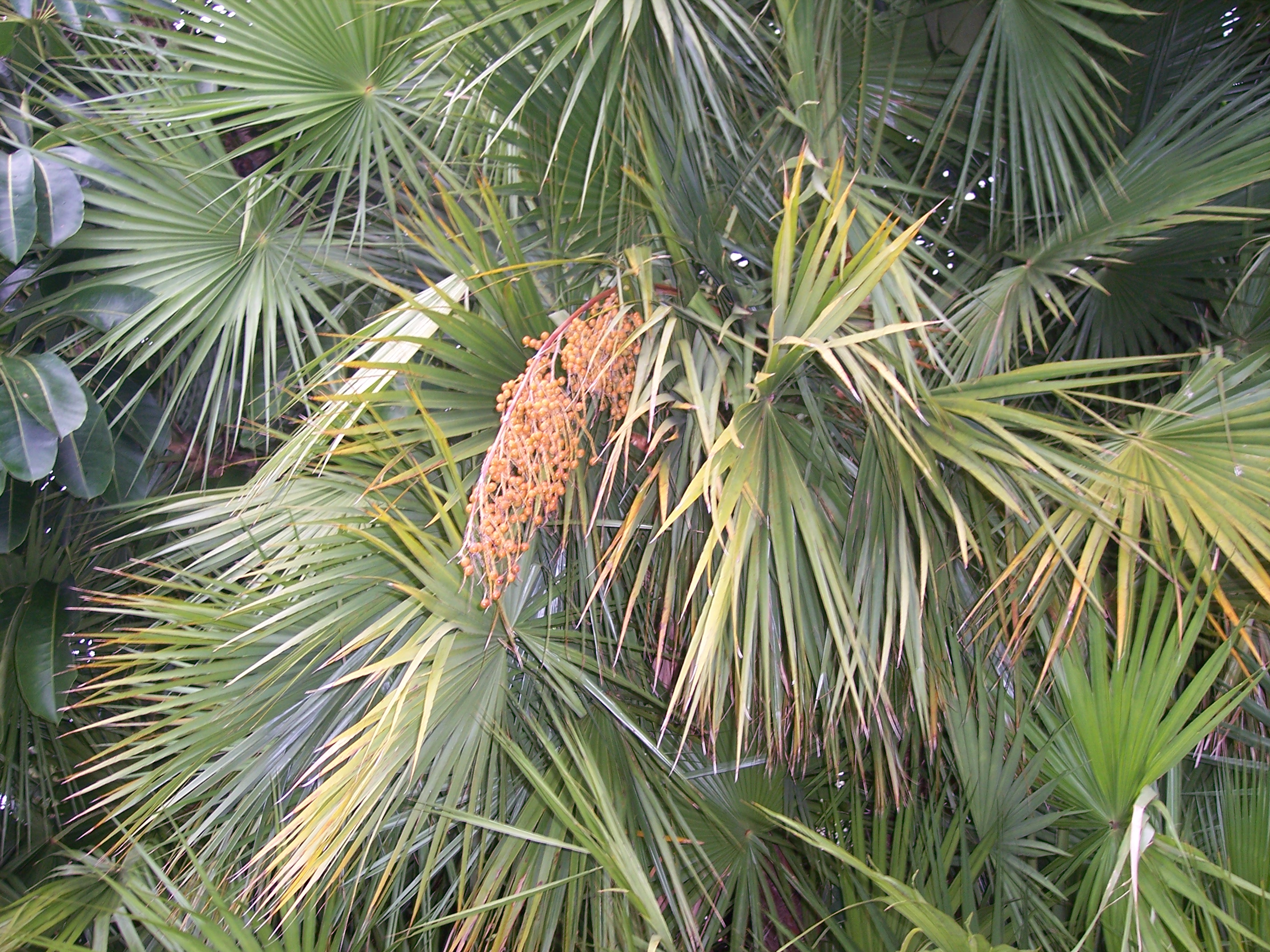
Fruit

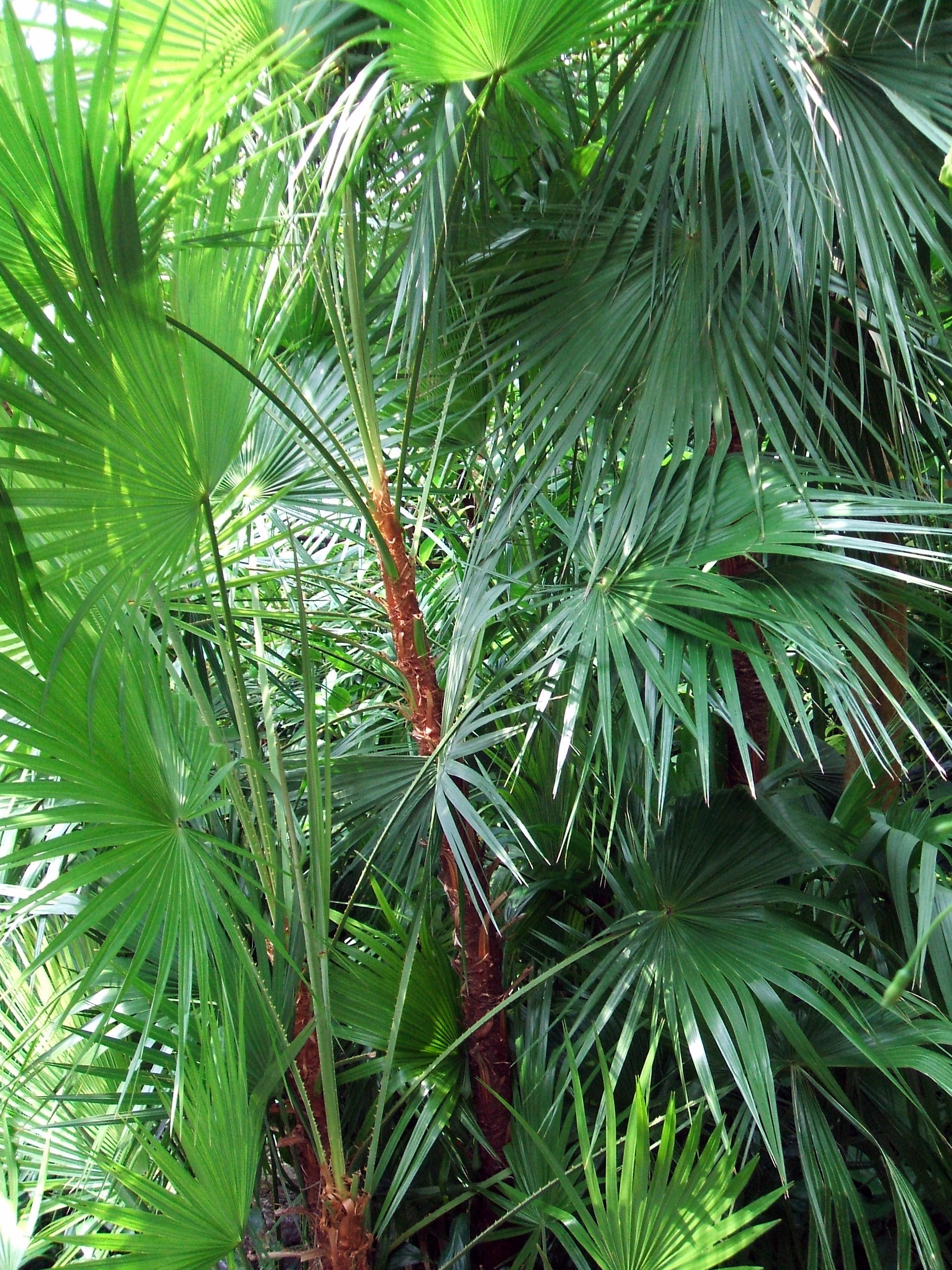
Cultivated specimen in a greenhouse at Missouri Botanical Garden
