= 2018–19 Irish Super League season =

- League: Super League
- Sport: Basketball
- Duration: 29 September 2018 – 24 March 2019 (Regular season); 30 March 2019 – 14 April 2019 (Champions Trophy)
- Games: 20
- Teams: 12

Regular season
- League champions: Tralee Warriors
- Season MVP: Jason Killeen (Templeogue)
- Top scorer: Mike Davis (Belfast Star) (29.0ppg)

Tournaments
- Champions Trophy champions: Templeogue
- Champions Trophy runners-up: Belfast Star
- National Cup champions: Killester
- National Cup runners-up: UCD Marian

Super League seasons
- ← 2017–18 2019–20 →

The 2018–19 Irish Super League season marked the 46th running of Basketball Ireland's premier men's basketball competition. The season initially featured 12 teams from both the Republic of Ireland and Northern Ireland but was reduced to 11 teams mid-season following Swords Thunder disbanding in February 2019. The regular season ran from 29 September 2018 to 24 March 2019 culminating in Tralee Warriors securing their first championship title. Killester claimed victory in the National Cup, while Templeogue won the Champions Trophy for the first time, having finished as runners-up in three of the previous four seasons.

== Teams ==
Denotes team that withdrew mid-season.

Team	Stadium	City/Area	Last season
Belfast Star	De La Salle College	Belfast	7th
DCU Saints	DCU Sports Complex	Glasnevin, Dublin	9th
Killester	IWA Sports Hall	Clontarf, Dublin	2nd
Killorglin	Killorglin Sports Complex	Killorglin	New
Maree	Calasanctius College	Oranmore	10th
Moycullen	Kingfisher, NUIG	Galway	8th
Neptune	Neptune Stadium	Cork	New
Swords Thunder	ALSAA Sports Complex	Dublin Airport, Dublin	5th
Templeogue	Oblate Hall	Inchicore, Dublin	3rd
Tralee Warriors	Tralee Sports Complex	Tralee	4th
UCC Demons	Mardyke Arena, UCC	Cork	6th
UCD Marian	UCD Sports Centre	Belfield, Dublin	1st

== League ==
=== Standings ===
Pos	Team	Pld	W	L	PF	PA	PD	Pts	Relegation
1	Tralee Warriors (C)	20	16	4	1741	1570	+171	48	
2	Templeogue	20	15	5	1724	1527	+197	45	
3	UCD Marian	20	13	7	1629	1487	+142	39	
4	Killester	20	12	8	1581	1519	+62	36	
5	Belfast Star	20	12	8	1693	1599	+94	36	
6	DCU Saints	20	10	10	1579	1658	−79	30	
7	UCC Demons	20	9	11	1621	1683	−62	27	
8	Maree	20	9	11	1623	1644	−21	27	
9	Killorglin	20	6	14	1555	1649	−94	18	
10	Moycullen	20	4	16	1556	1759	−203	12	
11	Neptune	20	4	16	1599	1806	−207	12	
12	Swords Thunder (Note: Withdrew during the season.)	0	0	0	0	0	0	0	Withdrew

Source: Basketball Ireland
(C) Champions

=== Results ===
Home \ Away	BEL	DCU	KIL	KLG	MAR	MOY	NEP	TEM	TW	UCC	UCD
Belfast Star	—	81–62	92–88	85–84	74–80	106–88	93–67	81–83	68–80	96–81	81–72
DCU Saints	55–96	—	92–74	79–75	91–71	85–83	90–79	67–89	92–102	95–87	76–71
Killester	82–70	84–71	—	79–73	82–77	99–74	76–62	56–81	86–82	86–63	63–73
Killorglin	78–88	92–87	67–64	—	79–83	81–64	61–62	87–88	68–77	81–79	76–101
Maree	96–75	98–77	86–91	91–84	—	86–79	85–66	62–72	92–99	81–90	81–73
Moycullen	82–91	77–85	64–89	82–57	66–59	—	108–97	79–105	82–93	64–71	56–87
Neptune	72–92	83–100	77–88	81–96	90–84	90–111	—	77–95	92–95	88–100	82–66
Templeogue	88–72	67–68	87–77	85–70	94–68	108–79	95–92	—	93–99	90–77	64–72
Tralee Warriors	79–89	89–55	71–55	86–89	88–70	95–73	87–82	88–77	—	70–75	88–73
UCC Demons	82–67	85–84	74–99	102–93	86–90	95–82	88–91	74–71	75–84	—	64–95
UCD Marian	100–96	75–68	83–63	86–64	84–83	80–63	96–69	82–88	84–89	76–73	—

Source: Basketball Ireland
Legend: Blue = home team win; Red = away team win.

== Champions Trophy ==
=== Bracket ===
Quarter-finals
UCD Marian	43
Belfast Star	84
Templeogue	108
DCU Saints	95

Semi-finals
Tralee Warriors	65
Belfast Star	81
Killester	84
Templeogue	88

Final
Belfast Star	62
Templeogue	77

=== Quarter-finals ===
30 March 2019

UCD Marian	43–84	Belfast Star

Oatlands College, Dublin

30 March 2019

Templeogue	108–95	DCU Saints

Oblate Hall, Dublin

=== Semi-finals ===
31 March 2019

Report

Tralee Warriors	65–81	Belfast Star

Tralee Sports Complex, Tralee

31 March 2019

Report

Killester	84–88	Templeogue

IWA-Clontarf, Dublin

=== Final ===
YouTube

14 April 2019
16:00 GMT

Box Score Report

Belfast Star	62–77	Templeogue
Scoring by quarter: 16–17, 13–17, 13–18, 20–25
Pts: CJ Fulton (16); Rebs: Mike Thiep (11); Asts: CJ Fulton (8)		Pts: Neil Randolph (19); Rebs: Jason Killeen (15); Asts: Stephen James (6)

DCU Sports Complex, Dublin
MVP: Neil Randolph

Source: Basketball Ireland

== National Cup ==
=== Round 1 ===
27 October 2018

Belfast Star	92–78	Neptune

De La Salle College, Belfast

27 October 2018

UCD Marian	98–78	Moycullen

UCD Sports Centre, Dublin

27 October 2018

Maree	80–83	Swords Thunder

Calasanctius College, Oranmore

27 October 2018

Templeogue	92–103	Tralee Warriors

Oblate Hall, Dublin

=== Round 2 ===
2 December 2018

Belfast Star	91–78	Killorglin

De La Salle College, Belfast

2 December 2018

UCD Marian	83–61	DCU Saints

UCD Sports Centre, Dublin

2 December 2018

Tralee Warriors	85–79	UCC Demons

Tralee Sports Complex, Tralee

2 December 2018

Swords Thunder	67–90	Killester

ALSAA, Dublin

=== Semi-finals ===
YouTube

12 January 2019
16:00 GMT

Box Score
Report

UCD Marian	91–63	Belfast Star
Scoring by quarter: 22–14, 28–23, 14–14, 27–12
Pts: Tied (18); Rebs: Tied (8); Asts: Barry Drumm (5)		Pts: Conor Quinn (16); Rebs: Mark Berlic (7); Asts: CJ Fulton (4)

Mardyke Arena, Cork

YouTube

12 January 2019
20:00 GMT

Box Score
Report

Killester	76–70	Tralee Warriors
Scoring by quarter: 29–13, 14–19, 13–16, 20–22
Pts: Ciaran Roe (34); Rebs: Luis-Filiberto Garcia Hoyos (13); Asts: Ciaran Roe (5)		Pts: Paul Dick (15); Rebs: Tied (7); Asts: Paul Dick (10)

Mardyke Arena, Cork

=== Final ===
26 January 2019
20:00 GMT

Box Score
Report

Killester	66–63	UCD Marian
Scoring by quarter: 18–19, 19–11, 9–23, 20–10
Pts: Luis-Filiberto Garcia Hoyos (18); Rebs: Ciaran Roe (9); Asts: Ciaran Roe (4)		Pts: Cathal Finn (12); Rebs: Neil Baynes (10); Asts: Scott Kinevane (5)

National Basketball Arena, Dublin
MVP: Luis-Filiberto Garcia Hoyos

Source: Basketball Ireland

== Awards ==
=== Player of the Month ===
Month	Player	Team	Ref
October	Kyle Hosford	UCC Demons	
November	Mike Davis	Belfast Star	
December	Paul Dick	Tralee Warriors	
January	Ciaran Roe	Killester	
February	Paul Dick	Tralee Warriors	
March	Mike Davis	Belfast Star	

=== Coach of the Month ===
Month	Player	Team	Ref
October	Adrian Fulton	Belfast Star	
November	Joey Boylan	DCU Saints	
December	Paul Kelleher	Neptune	
January	Brian O'Malley	Killester	
February	Pat Price	Tralee Warriors	
March	Pat Price	Tralee Warriors	

=== Statistics leaders ===
Stats as of the end of the regular season

Category	Player	Team	Stat
Points per game	Mike Davis	Belfast Star	29.0
Rebounds per game	Martins Provizors	DCU Saints	12.6
Assists per game	Scott Kinevane	UCD Marian	8.3
Steals per game	Joan Jordi Vall-llobera	UCD Marian	3.3
Blocks per game	Jason Killeen	Templeogue	2.2

=== Regular season ===
- Player of the Year: Jason Killeen (Templeogue)
- Young Player of the Year: CJ Fulton (Belfast Star)
- Coach of the Year: Pat Price (Tralee Warriors)
- All-Star First Team:
  - Paul Dick (Tralee Warriors)
  - Mike Davis (Belfast Star)
  - Sean Sellers (Maree)
  - Mike Bonaparte (DCU Saints)
  - Jason Killeen (Templeogue)
- All-Star Second Team:
  - Ciaran Roe (Killester)
  - Royce Williams (Killester)
  - Lorcan Murphy (Templeogue)
  - Eoin Quigley (Tralee Warriors)
  - Niels Bunschoten (Maree)
- All-Star Third Team:
  - Elijah Mays (UCD Marian)
  - Neil Randolph (Templeogue)
  - Kieran Donaghy (Tralee Warriors)
  - Luis Filiberto Garcia Hoyos (Killester)
  - Martins Provizors (DCU Saints)
