= 2022–23 Irish Super League season =

- League: Super League
- Sport: Basketball
- Duration: 1 October 2022 – 11 March 2023 (Regular season); 18 March 2023 – 1 April 2023 (Playoffs)
- Number of teams: 14

Regular season
- Season MVP: M. J. Randolph (UCC Demons)
- National Cup champions: Maree
- National Cup runners-up: Éanna

Playoffs
- Champions: Ballincollig
- Runners-up: Maree

Super League seasons
- ← 2021–22 2023–24 →

The 2022–23 Irish Super League season was the 49th running of Basketball Ireland's premier men's basketball competition. The season featured 14 teams from across the Republic of Ireland and Northern Ireland.

== Teams ==
Team	Stadium	City/Area	2021–22 season
Ballincollig	Ballincollig Community School	Ballincollig, Cork	1st South
Belfast Star	De La Salle College	Belfast	6th North
Éanna	Coláiste Éanna	Rathfarnham, Dublin	1st North
Killester	IWA Sports Hall	Clontarf, Dublin	2nd North
Killorglin	Killorglin Sports Complex	Killorglin	6th South
Maree	Kingfisher, NUIG	Galway	4th South
Moycullen	Kingfisher, NUIG	Galway	5th South
Neptune	Neptune Stadium	Blackpool, Cork	3rd South
Sligo All-Stars	Mercy College	Sligo	Div. 1 (promoted)
St. Vincent's	St. Vincent's C.B.S.	Glasnevin, Dublin	5th North
Templeogue	National Basketball Arena; Nord Anglia International School	Dublin	4th North
Tralee Warriors	Tralee Sports Complex	Tralee	2nd South
UCC Demons	Mardyke Arena	Cork	Div. 1 (promoted)
UCD Marian	UCD Sports Centre	Belfield, Dublin	3rd North

== Results ==
=== Regular season standings ===
==== North Conference ====
Pos	Team	Pld	W	L	PF	PA	PD	Pts	
1	Éanna	19	14	5	1554	1443	+111	42	Qualification to quarter-finals
2	Belfast Star	19	13	6	1569	1460	+109	39	Qualification to quarter-finals
3	Killester	19	10	9	1478	1499	−21	30	Qualification to quarter-finals
4	Sligo All-Stars	19	8	11	1603	1619	−16	24	Qualification to quarter-finals
5	Templeogue	19	6	13	1516	1614	−98	18	
6	St. Vincent's	19	5	14	1394	1578	−184	15	
7	UCD Marian	19	2	17	1272	1586	−314	6	Relegation playoff

Source: Basketball Ireland

==== South Conference ====
Pos	Team	Pld	W	L	PF	PA	PD	Pts	
1	Maree	19	16	3	1569	1339	+230	48	Qualification to quarter-finals
2	UCC Demons	19	14	5	1685	1585	+100	42	Qualification to quarter-finals
3	Neptune	19	12	7	1714	1550	+164	36	Qualification to quarter-finals
4	Ballincollig	19	12	7	1619	1485	+134	36	Qualification to quarter-finals
5	Tralee Warriors	19	11	8	1599	1517	+82	33	
6	Killorglin	19	6	13	1620	1641	−21	18	
7	Moycullen	19	4	15	1191	1467	−276	12	Relegation playoff

Source: Basketball Ireland

=== Playoffs ===
==== Bracket ====
Quarter-finals
N1	Éanna	94
S4	Ballincollig	101
S2	UCC Demons	120
N3	Killester	116
S1	Maree	80
N4	Sligo All-Stars	72
N2	Belfast Star	73
S3	Neptune	69

Semi-finals
UCC Demons	76
Ballincollig	84
Maree	87
Belfast Star	75

Final
Ballincollig	78
Maree	64

==== Quarter-finals ====
18 March 2023

Éanna	94–101	Ballincollig

Coláiste Éanna, Dublin

18 March 2023

Maree	80–72	Sligo All-Stars

NUIG Kingfisher, Galway

18 March 2023

Belfast Star	73–69	Neptune

De La Salle College, Belfast

19 March 2023

UCC Demons	120–116	Killester

Mardyke Arena, Cork

Source: Basketball Ireland

==== Relegation play-off ====
19 March 2023

Moycullen	69–64	UCD Marian

National Basketball Arena, Dublin

==== Semi-finals ====
25 March 2023

Maree	87–75	Belfast Star

NUIG Kingfisher, Galway

26 March 2023

UCC Demons	76–84	Ballincollig

Mardyke Arena, Cork

Source: Basketball Ireland

==== Final ====
1 April 2023

Preview Report

Ballincollig	78–64	Maree
Pts: John Dawson (31)		Pts: Rodrigo Gomez (16)

National Basketball Arena, Dublin
MVP: John Dawson

== National Cup ==
=== Round 1 ===
5 November 2022

Ballincollig	98–52	Moycullen

Ballincollig Community School, Cork

5 November 2022

Éanna	85–79	Tralee Warriors

Coláiste Éanna, Dublin

5 November 2022

Belfast Star	71–61	Templeogue

De La Salle College, Belfast

5 November 2022

Neptune	96–87	UCC Demons

Neptune Stadium, Cork

5 November 2022

St. Vincent's	94–75	Sligo All-Stars

St. Vincent's C.B.S., Dublin

5 November 2022

Maree	91–81	Killorglin

NUIG Kingfisher, Galway

=== Quarter-finals ===
3 December 2022

Ballincollig	74–62	Killester

Ballincollig Community School, Cork

3 December 2022

Neptune	93–97	Éanna

Neptune Stadium, Cork

3 December 2022

St. Vincent's	93–75	UCD Marian

St. Vincent's C.B.S., Dublin

3 December 2022

Maree	92–77	Belfast Star

Calasanctius College, Oranmore

=== Semi-finals ===
7 January 2023

Maree	86–68	St. Vincent's

Neptune Stadium, Cork

7 January 2023

Éanna	77–71	Ballincollig

Neptune Stadium, Cork

=== Final ===
21 January 2023

Report

Éanna	69–74	Maree
Pts: Sean Jenkins, Marko Tomic (14)		Pts: Jarett Haines (35)

National Basketball Arena, Dublin
MVP: Jarett Haines

Source: Basketball Ireland

== Awards ==
=== Player of the Month ===
Month	Player	Team	Ref
October	Greg Poleon	Sligo All-Stars	
November	Jarett Haines	Maree	
December	M. J. Randolph	UCC Demons	
January	Jarett Haines	Maree	
February	M. J. Randolph	UCC Demons	
March			

=== Coach of the Month ===
Month	Player	Team	Ref
October	Shane O'Meara	Sligo All-Stars	
November	Charlie Crowley	Maree	
December	Darren McGovern	Éanna	
January	Charlie Crowley	Maree	
February	Danny O'Mahony	UCC Demons	
March			

=== Statistics leaders ===
There were no web-based statistics or box scores in 2022–23 after the league moved all operations to a subscription-based app.

Category	Player	Team	Stat
Points per game			
Rebounds per game			
Assists per game			
Steals per game			
Blocks per game			

=== Regular season ===
- Player of the Year: M. J. Randolph (UCC Demons)
- Young Player of the Year: James Hannigan (UCC Demons)
- Coach of the Year: Ciaran O'Sullivan (Ballincollig)
- All-Star First Team:
  - Chrishon Briggs (Belfast Star)
  - Jarett Haines (Maree)
  - M. J. Randolph (UCC Demons)
  - Paul Dick (Killester)
  - Rodrigo Gomez (Maree)
- All-Star Second Team:
  - De'Ondre Jackson (Tralee Warriors)
  - Jordan Blount (Neptune)
  - Jose Jimenez Gonzales (Ballincollig)
  - Josh Wilson (Éanna)
  - R. J. Kelly (Killorglin)
- All-Star Third Team:
  - Daniel Jokubaitis (Tralee Warriors)
  - Donovan Fields (St. Vincent's)
  - John Dawson (Ballincollig)
  - Jonathan Jean (UCD Marian)
  - Kyle Hosford (UCC Demons)
