= 2013–14 Irish Premier League season =

- League: Premier League
- Sport: Basketball
- Duration: 5 October 2013 – 9 March 2014 (Regular season); 15 March 2014 – 23 March 2014 (Champions Trophy)
- Number of games: 18
- Number of teams: 10

Regular season
- League champions: Killester
- Season MVP: Michael Bonaparte (Killester)
- Top scorer: Michael Callaghan (Moycullen) (26.2 ppg)

Tournaments
- Champions Trophy champions: UCC Demons
- Champions Trophy runners-up: Killester
- National Cup champions: UCC Demons
- National Cup runners-up: Dublin Inter

Premier League seasons
- ← 2012–13 2014–15 →

The 2013–14 Irish Premier League season was the 41st running of Basketball Ireland's premier men's basketball competition. The season featured 10 teams from across the Republic of Ireland and Northern Ireland, with the regular season beginning on 5 October 2013 and ending on 9 March 2014. With a first-place finish and a 17–1 win–loss record, Killester were crowned league champions for the eighth time in their history. UCC Demons were crowned National Cup champions for a sixth time, and won the season finale Champions Trophy tournament for the second straight year.

== Teams ==
Team	Stadium	City/Area	Last season
Belfast Star	Methodist College	Belfast	New
DCU Saints	DCU Sports Complex	Glasnevin, Dublin	4th
Dublin Inter	Mountview Y&C Club	Clonsilla, Dublin	8th
Killester	IWA Sports Hall	Clontarf, Dublin	5th
Moycullen	Kingfisher, NUIG	Galway	6th
Neptune	Neptune Stadium	Cork	2nd
Templeogue	Oblate Hall	Inchicore, Dublin	New
UCC Demons	Mardyke Arena, UCC	Cork	3rd
UCD Marian	UCD Sports Centre	Belfield, Dublin	7th
UL Eagles	UL Arena	Limerick	1st

== Regular season ==
=== Standings ===
#	Irish Premier League Regular Season Standings					
#	Team	W	L	PCT	BP	PTS
1	Killester	17	1	94	1	52
2	UCC Demons	16	2	89	1	49
3	Neptune	11	7	61	1	34
4	DCU Saints	10	8	56	2	32
5	UL Eagles	10	8	56	1	31
6	Belfast Star	9	9	50	4	31
7	UCD Marian	8	10	44	2	26
8	Dublin Inter	6	12	33	3	21
9	Moycullen	2	16	11	1	7
10	Templeogue	1	17	6	4	7

Source: Comortais

== Champions Trophy ==
=== Bracket ===
Quarter-finals
4	DCU Saints	83
Maree*	63
3	Neptune	82
Titans**	86

Semi-finals
1	Killester	76
4	DCU Saints	64
2	UCC Demons	106
3	Titans	68

Final
Killester	60
UCC Demons	79

*National League Division 1 champions.

**Fourth place in National League Division 1.

=== Quarter-finals ===
15 March 2014
20:00 GMT

Report

Maree	63–83	DCU Saints
Pts: Kenneth Hansberry (25)		Pts: Eoin Quill (27)

Calasanctius College, Oranmore

16 March 2014
15:00 GMT

Report

Titans	86–82	Neptune
Pts: Tomas Mitkus (24)		Pts: Darren Townes (24)

Merlin Woods College, Galway

=== Semi-finals ===
21 March 2014
19:00 GMT

Preview Box Score

UCC Demons	106–68	Titans
Scoring by quarter: 34–22, 25–12, 18–14, 29–20
Pts: Adrian O'Sullivan (25); Rebs: Christian Anon (12); Asts: Shane Coughlan (4)		Pts: Tomas Mitkus (22); Rebs: Tomas Mitkus (12); Asts: Chris Coyne (4)

Neptune Stadium, Cork

21 March 2014
21:00 GMT

Preview

Killester	76–64	DCU Saints
Pts: Ciaran Roe (15)		Pts: Mārtiņš Provizors (24)

Neptune Stadium, Cork

=== Final ===
23 March 2014
16:00 GMT

Box Score

Killester	60–79	UCC Demons
Scoring by quarter: 17–30, 18–14, 7–16, 18–19
Pts: Michael Bonaparte (14); Rebs: Kieran O'Brien (13); Asts: Tied (3)		Pts: Christian Anon (19); Rebs: Lehmon Colbert (12); Asts: Lehmon Colbert (4)

Neptune Stadium, Cork
MVP: Christian Anon

== National Cup ==
=== Round 1 (2 legs) ===
8 November 2013 (Series 1)

Templeogue	48–84	DCU Saints

National Basketball Arena, Dublin

9 November 2013 (Series 2)

Neptune	104–59	Moycullen

Neptune Stadium, Cork

9 November 2013 (Series 3)

Killester	83–80	Belfast Star

IWA-Clontarf, Dublin

9 November 2013 (Series 4)

UL Eagles	74–63	Dublin Inter

UL Arena, Limerick

10 November 2013 (Series 5)

UCC Demons	96–65	UCD Marian

Mardyke Arena, Cork

16 November 2013 (Series 1)

DCU Saints	79–76	Templeogue
DCU Saints win Series 1 on aggregate (163–124).

DCU Sports Complex, Dublin

16 November 2013 (Series 2)

Moycullen	80–92	Neptune
Neptune win Series 2 on aggregate (196–139).

NUIG Kingfisher, Galway

16 November 2013 (Series 3)

Belfast Star	61–78	Killester
Killester win Series 3 on aggregate (161–141).

Methodist College, Belfast

16 November 2013 (Series 4)

Dublin Inter	84–72	UL Eagles
Dublin Inter win Series 4 on aggregate (147–146).

Mountview Y&C Club, Dublin

16 November 2013 (Series 5)

UCD Marian	98–68	UCC Demons
UCC Demons win Series 5 on aggregate (164–163).

UCD Sports Centre, Dublin

=== Round 2 (1 leg) ===
Winner of Series 1 vs Winner of Series 2

7 December 2013

Neptune	95–87	DCU Saints

Neptune Stadium, Cork

=== Semi-finals ===
Winner of Series 3 vs Winner of Series 5

10 January 2014

UCC Demons	87–86	Killester

Neptune Stadium, Cork

Winner of Series 4 vs Winner of Round 2

10 January 2014

Neptune	61–65	Dublin Inter

Neptune Stadium, Cork

=== Final ===
24 January 2014
20:45 GMT

Report Report Report

UCC Demons	82–64	Dublin Inter
Pts: Lehmon Colbert (21)		Pts: Mindaugas Tamušauskas (17)

National Basketball Arena, Dublin
MVP: Lehmon Colbert

Source: Comortais

== Premier League Select Team ==
=== Gathering Shield ===
The 2013 "Gathering Shield" match between the Premier League Select Team and the Welsh National Select Team took place at the National Basketball Arena on Saturday 26 October.

==== Team ====
- Shane Coughlan (UCC Demons)
- Niall O'Reilly (UCC Demons)
- Colin O'Reilly (UCC Demons)
- Mike McGinn (Neptune)
- Ger Noonan (Neptune)
- Mati Rudak (Neptune)
- Neil Campbell (UL Eagles)
- Scott Kinnevane (UL Eagles)
- Keith Anderson (Swords Thunder – National League Division 1)
- Isaac Westbrooks (Killester)
- Mindaugas Tamušauskas (Dublin Inter)
- Paul O'Brien (Moycullen)

Head Coach: Mark Keenan (UL Eagles)
Assistant Coaches: Jerome Westbrooks (Killester) and Mike Hickey (UL Eagles)

==== Game data ====
26 October 2013
17:00 GMT

Details Report

Premier League Select	90–47	Wales Select

National Basketball Arena, Dublin

=== Ireland vs England ===
For the second straight year, the Premier League Select Team travelled to Birmingham, England to play against the England Select Team in the BBL Cup Final curtain-raiser. The match took place at the National Indoor Arena on Sunday 12 January, with tip off at 12pm.

==== Team ====
- Paul Dick (Belfast Star)
- Darren Townes (Neptune)
- Ger Noonan (Neptune)
- Ian McLoughlin (Neptune)
- Michael McGinn (Neptune)
- Ciaran O'Sullivan (UCC Demons)
- Mārtiņš Provisors (DCU Saints)
- Kieran O'Brien (Killester)
- Mike Westbrooks (Killester)
- Dylan Cunningham (Moycullen)
- Delwan Graham (UL Eagles)
- Scott Kinnevane (UL Eagles)

Head Coach: Mark Keenan (UL Eagles)
Assistant Coaches: Jerome Westbrooks (Killester) and Mike Hickey (UL Eagles)
Team Manager: Aidan O'Brien

==== Game data ====
12 January 2014
12:00 GMT

Report

England Select	66–75	Premier League Select
Pts: Nick George (16)		Pts: Delwan Graham (21)

National Indoor Arena, Birmingham

== Awards ==
=== Player of the Month ===
Month	Player	Team	Ref
October	Michael Bonaparte	Killester	
November	Mārtiņš Provizors	DCU Saints	
December	Lehmon Colbert	UCC Demons	
January	Aurimas Statkus	Dublin Inter	
February	Michael McGinn	Neptune	
March	Michael Bonaparte	Killester	

=== Coach of the Month ===
Month	Player	Team	Ref
October	Colin O'Reilly	UCC Demons	
November	Jonathan Grennell	Killester	
December	Dave Donnelly	DCU Saints	
January	Colin O'Reilly	UCC Demons	
February	Ioannis Liapakis	UCD Marian	
March	Jonathan Grennell	Killester	

=== Statistics leaders ===
Stats as of the end of the regular season

Category	Player	Team	Stat
Points per game	Michael Callaghan	Moycullen	26.2
Rebounds per game	Michael Callaghan	Moycullen	14.9
Assists per game	Scott Kinevane	UL Eagles	8.8
Steals per game	Dylan Cunningham	Moycullen	3.4
Blocks per game	Mati Rudak	Neptune	2.8

=== Regular season ===
- Player of the Year: Michael Bonaparte (Killester)
- U23 Player of the Year: Paul Dick (Belfast Star)
- Coach of the Year: Jonathan Grennell (Killester)
