= 2016–17 Irish Super League season =

- League: Super League
- Sport: Basketball
- Duration: 23 September 2016 – 19 March 2017 (Regular season); 25 March 2017 – 2 April 2017 (Champions Trophy)
- Games: 22
- Teams: 12

Regular season
- League champions: Templeogue
- Season MVP: Trae Pemberton (Tralee Warriors)
- Top scorer: Dillon Stith (Belfast Star) (27.4 ppg)

Tournaments
- Champions Trophy champions: Tralee Warriors
- Champions Trophy runners-up: Templeogue
- National Cup champions: Swords Thunder
- National Cup runners-up: Killester

Super League seasons
- ← 2015–16 2017–18 →

The 2016–17 Irish Super League season was the 44th running of Basketball Ireland's premier men's basketball competition. The season featured 12 teams from across the Republic of Ireland and Northern Ireland, with the regular season beginning on 23 September 2016 and ending on 19 March 2017. During the 2016 off-season, Basketball Ireland expanded its top flight men's league to 12 teams, with new team Tralee Warriors entering and Dublin side KUBS being granted promotion from the Men's Division One. With a first-place finish and a 20–2 win–loss record, Templeogue were crowned league champions for the first time in their history. 2017 National Cup honours went to Swords Thunder, who collected their first piece of silverware in the top flight league, while Tralee were crowned the winners of the season finale Champions Trophy tournament after defeating Templeogue in the final.

== Teams ==
Team	Stadium	City/Area	Last season
Belfast Star	Methodist College	Belfast	7th
DCU Saints	DCU Sports Complex	Glasnevin, Dublin	6th
Éanna	Coláiste Éanna	Rathfarnham, Dublin	10th
Killester	IWA Sports Hall	Clontarf, Dublin	2nd
KUBS	Carroll Arena	Greendale, Dublin	New
Moycullen	Kingfisher, NUIG	Galway	9th
Swords Thunder	ALSAA Sports Complex	Dublin Airport, Dublin	5th
Templeogue	Oblate Hall	Inchicore, Dublin	3rd
Tralee Warriors	Tralee Sports Complex	Tralee	New
UCC Demons	Mardyke Arena, UCC	Cork	1st
UCD Marian	UCD Sports Centre	Belfield, Dublin	4th
UL Eagles	PESS Building, UL	Limerick	8th

== Regular season ==
Pos	Team	Pld	W	L	PF	PA	PD	Pts	Qualification or relegation
1	Templeogue (C)	22	20	2	1906	1619	+287	60	
2	Swords Thunder	22	19	3	1902	1518	+384	57	
3	Tralee Warriors	22	17	5	1773	1590	+183	51	
4	UCD Marian	22	17	5	1871	1656	+215	51	
5	Killester	22	13	9	1683	1601	+82	39	
6	UCC Demons	22	12	10	1776	1827	−51	36	
7	Moycullen	22	9	13	1730	1784	−54	27	
8	DCU Saints	22	7	15	1628	1754	−126	21	
9	Éanna	22	6	16	1568	1746	−178	18	
10	Belfast Star	22	6	16	1564	1717	−153	18	
11	KUBS	22	5	17	1526	1731	−205	15	
12	UL Eagles (R)	22	1	21	1387	1771	−384	3	Relegated

Source: Basketball Ireland
(C) Champions; (R) Relegated

== Champions Trophy ==
=== Bracket ===
Quarter-finals
4	UCD Marian	80
Ulster University Elks**	56
3	Tralee Warriors	82
Maree*	67

Semi-finals
1	Templeogue	71
4	UCD Marian	64
2	Swords Thunder	64
3	Tralee Warriors	66

Final
Templeogue	73
Tralee Warriors	74

*National League Division 1 champions.

**National League Division 1 runners-up.

=== Quarter-finals ===
25 March 2017
15:00 GMT

Ulster University Elks	56–80	UCD Marian
Pts: Marty McDonald (18)		Pts: Tied (19)

Methodist College, Belfast

25 March 2017
19:00 GMT

Maree	67–82	Tralee Warriors
Pts: Eoin Rockall (18)		Pts: Trae Pemberton (31)

Calasanctius College, Oranmore

Source: Basketball Ireland, Basketball Ireland

=== Semi-finals ===
1 April 2017
16:00 GMT

Box Score

Templeogue	71–64	UCD Marian
Scoring by quarter: 20–21, 14–10, 15–19, 22–14
Pts: Jason Killeen (21); Rebs: Jason Killeen (14); Asts: Tied (3)		Pts: Conor Meany (17); Rebs: Mike Garrow (12); Asts: Scott Kinevane (9)

LYIT, Letterkenny

1 April 2017
18:00 GMT

Box Score

Swords Thunder	64–66	Tralee Warriors
Scoring by quarter: 15–18, 12–18, 16–16, 21–14
Pts: Alex Dolenko (13); Rebs: José María Gil Narbón (10); Asts: Alex Calvexe (4)		Pts: Trae Pemberton (24); Rebs: Goran Pantovic (14); Asts: Kieran Donaghy (5)

LYIT, Letterkenny

Source: Basketball Ireland Basketball Ireland

=== Final ===
YouTube

2 April 2017
16:00 GMT

Box Score Report Report

Templeogue	73–74 (OT)	Tralee Warriors
Scoring by quarter: 16–18, 20–16, 14–17, 16–15, Overtime: 7–8
Pts: Michael Bonaparte (22); Rebs: Michael Bonaparte (14); Asts: Stephen James (6)		Pts: Trae Pemberton (21); Rebs: Goran Pantovic (18); Asts: Kieran Donaghy (8)

LYIT, Letterkenny
MVP: Kieran Donaghy

== National Cup ==
=== Round 1 (2 legs) ===
22 October 2016 (Series 1)

Moycullen	72–71	Belfast Star

NUIG Kingfisher, Galway

22 October 2016 (Series 2)

UCD Marian	95–68	UL Eagles

UCD Sports Centre, Dublin

22 October 2016 (Series 3)

Tralee Warriors	61–55	Swords Thunder

Tralee Sports Complex, Tralee

22 October 2016 (Series 4)

KUBS	72–65	Éanna

Carroll Arena, Dublin

22 October 2016 (Series 5)

Killester	69–70	DCU Saints

IWA-Clontarf, Dublin

22 October 2016 (Series 6)

Templeogue	96–87	UCC Demons

Oblate Hall, Dublin

29 October 2016 (Series 2)

UL Eagles	62–69	UCD Marian
UCD Marian win Series 2 on aggregate (164–130).

UL Arena, Limerick

29 October 2016 (Series 3)

Swords Thunder	77–64	Tralee Warriors
Swords Thunder win Series 3 on aggregate (132–125).

ALSAA, Dublin

29 October 2016 (Series 4)

Éanna	53–68	KUBS
KUBS win Series 4 on aggregate (140–118).

Coláiste Éanna, Dublin

29 October 2016 (Series 5)

DCU Saints	68–84	Killester
Killester win Series 5 on aggregate (153–138).

DCU Sports Complex, Dublin

30 October 2016 (Series 6)

UCC Demons	85–94	Templeogue
Templeogue win Series 6 on aggregate (190–172).

Mardyke Arena, Cork

19 November 2016 (Series 1)

Belfast Star	80–84	Moycullen
Moycullen win Series 1 on aggregate (156–151).

Methodist College, Belfast

=== Round 2 (1 leg) ===
Winner of Series 5 vs Winner of Series 4

26 November 2016

Killester	84–62	KUBS

IWA-Clontarf, Dublin

Winner of Series 6 vs Winner of Series 3

7 December 2016

Templeogue	81–88	Swords Thunder

National Basketball Arena, Dublin

=== Semi-finals ===
Winner of Series 1 vs Winner of Game 2, Round 2

7 January 2017
16:00 GMT

Moycullen	77–85	Swords Thunder

Neptune Stadium, Cork

Winner of Game 1, Round 2 vs Winner of Series 2

7 January 2017
20:00 GMT

Killester	81–69	UCD Marian

Neptune Stadium, Cork

=== Final ===
YouTube

28 January 2017
20:00 GMT

Box Score Report

Killester	51–72	Swords Thunder
Scoring by quarter: 15–17, 12–16, 13–20, 11–19
Pts: Cian Nihill (16); Rebs: Jermaine Turner (16); Asts: Ciaran Roe (4)		Pts: Justin Goldsborough (14); Rebs: José María Gil Narbón (8); Asts: Isaac Westbrooks (7)

National Basketball Arena, Dublin
MVP: José María Gil Narbón

Source: Basketball Ireland

== Awards ==
=== Player of the Month ===
Month	Player	Team	Ref
October	Lorcan Murphy	Templeogue	
November	Lorcan Murphy	Templeogue	
December	Dillon Stith	Belfast Star	
January	José María Gil Narbón	Swords Thunder	
February	Trae Pemberton	Tralee Warriors	
March	Trae Pemberton	Tralee Warriors	

=== Coach of the Month ===
Month	Player	Team	Ref
October	Mark Keenan	Templeogue	
November	Dave Baker	Swords Thunder	
December	Mark Keenan	Templeogue	
January	Dave Baker	Swords Thunder	
February	Mark Bernsen	Tralee Warriors	
March	Mark Bernsen	Tralee Warriors	

=== Statistics leaders ===
Stats as of the end of the regular season

Category	Player	Team	Stat
Points per game	Dillon Stith	Belfast Star	27.4
Rebounds per game	Mārtiņš Provizors	DCU Saints	16.7
Assists per game	Scott Kinevane	UCD Marian	9.7
Steals per game	Michael Garrow	UCD Marian	5.4
Blocks per game	Jacob Lawson	UCC Demons	3.2

=== Regular season ===
- Player of the Year: Trae Pemberton (Tralee Warriors)
- Young Player of the Year: Ryan Leonard (Tralee Warriors)
- Coach of the Year: Mark Bernsen (Tralee Warriors)
- All-Star First Team:
  - Trae Pemberton (Tralee Warriors)
  - José María Gil Narbón (Swords Thunder)
  - Lorcan Murphy (Templeogue)
  - Jermaine Turner (Killester)
  - Michael Bonaparte (Templeogue)
- All-Star Second Team:
  - Dillon Stith (Belfast Star)
  - Mike Garrow (UCD Marian)
  - Kevin Foley (KUBS)
  - Jason Killeen (Templeogue)
  - Isaac Westbrooks (Swords Thunder)
- All-Star Third Team:
  - Kieran Donaghy (Tralee Warriors)
  - Corbin Jackson (KUBS)
  - Keelan Cairns (Belfast Star)
  - Mārtiņš Provizors (DCU Saints)
  - Ryan Leonard (Tralee Warriors)
