= 2015–16 Irish Premier League season =

- League: Premier League
- Sport: Basketball
- Duration: 3 October 2015 – 6 March 2016 (Regular season); 12 March 2016 – 20 March 2016 (Champions Trophy)
- Games: 18
- Teams: 10

Regular season
- League champions: UCC Demons
- Season MVP: Lehmon Colbert (UCC Demons)
- Top scorer: Duane Johnson (DCU Saints) (26.2 ppg)

Tournaments
- Champions Trophy champions: UCC Demons
- Champions Trophy runners-up: Killester
- National Cup champions: Templeogue
- National Cup runners-up: Swords Thunder

Premier League seasons
- ← 2014–15 2016–17 →

The 2015–16 Irish Premier League season was the 43rd running of Basketball Ireland's premier men's basketball competition. The season featured 10 teams from across the Republic of Ireland and Northern Ireland, with the regular season beginning on 3 October 2015 and ending on 6 March 2016. With a first-place finish and a 16–2 win–loss record, UCC Demons were crowned back-to-back league champions, while 2016 National Cup honours went to Templeogue, who collected their first piece of silverware. In the season finale Champions Trophy tournament, Demons took out the title for the fourth straight year.

== Teams ==
Team	Stadium	City/Area	Last season
Belfast Star	Methodist College	Belfast	6th
DCU Saints	DCU Sports Complex	Glasnevin, Dublin	8th
Éanna	Coláiste Éanna	Rathfarnham, Dublin	New
Killester	IWA Sports Hall	Clontarf, Dublin	4th
Moycullen	Kingfisher, NUIG	Galway	New
Swords Thunder	ALSAA Sports Complex	Dublin Airport, Dublin	2nd
Templeogue	Oblate Hall	Inchicore, Dublin	3rd
UCC Demons	Mardyke Arena, UCC	Cork	1st
UCD Marian	UCD Sports Centre	Belfield, Dublin	5th
UL Eagles	PESS Building, UL	Limerick	9th

== Regular season ==
=== Standings ===
#	Irish Premier League Regular Season Standings				
#	Team	W	L	PCT	PTS
1	UCC Demons	16	2	89	48
2	Killester	14	4	78	42
3	Templeogue	14	4	78	42
4	UCD Marian	10	8	56	30
5	Swords Thunder	9	9	50	27
6	DCU Saints	7	11	39	21
7	Belfast Star	6	12	33	18
8	UL Eagles	6	12	33	18
9	Moycullen	5	13	28	15
10	Éanna	3	15	17	9

Source: Basketball Ireland

== Champions Trophy ==
=== Bracket ===
Quarter-finals
4	UCD Marian	101
KUBS**	67
3	Templeogue	86
Maree*	73

Semi-finals
1	UCC Demons	75
4	UCD Marian	71
2	Killester	94
3	Templeogue	76

Final
UCC Demons	82
Killester	77

*National League Division 1 champions.

**National League Division 1 runners-up.

=== Quarter-finals ===
12 March 2016
16:30 GMT

Maree	73–86	Templeogue
Pts: Cathal Finn (18)		Pts: Michael Bonaparte (34)

Calasanctius College, Oranmore

12 March 2016
20:00 GMT

KUBS	67–101	UCD Marian
Pts: Jonathan Riles (19)		Pts: Dustan Moreira (24)

Carroll Arena, Greendale, Dublin

Source: Basketball Ireland

=== Semi-finals ===
19 March 2016
15:00 GMT

Box Score Report

Killester	94–76	Templeogue
Scoring by quarter: 26–21, 24–24, 19–18, 25–13
Pts: Jermaine Turner (25); Rebs: Jermaine Turner (16); Asts: Ciaran Roe (6)		Pts: Michael Bonaparte (28); Rebs: Michael Bonaparte (13); Asts: Tied (5)

The Watershed, Kilkenny

19 March 2016
17:00 GMT

Box Score Report

UCC Demons	75–71	UCD Marian
Scoring by quarter: 23–18, 19–19, 22–22, 11–12
Pts: Lehmon Colbert (35); Rebs: Lehmon Colbert (17); Asts: Kyle Hosford (5)		Pts: Dustan Moreira (17); Rebs: Dustan Moreira (11); Asts: Barry Drumm (8)

The Watershed, Kilkenny

Source: Basketball Ireland, Basketball Ireland

=== Final ===
YouTube

20 March 2016
16:00 GMT

Box Score Report

UCC Demons	82–77	Killester
Scoring by quarter: 16–15, 24–26, 26–14, 16–22
Pts: Lehmon Colbert (27); Rebs: Lehmon Colbert (16); Asts: Colin O'Reilly (10)		Pts: Paul Dick (22); Rebs: Paul Dick (12); Asts: Tied (6)

The Watershed, Kilkenny
MVP: Lehmon Colbert

== National Cup ==
=== Round 1 (2 legs) ===
13 November 2015 (Series 1)

UL Eagles	53–82	UCC Demons

UL Arena, Limerick

14 November 2015 (Series 2)

UCD Marian	116–85	DCU Saints

UCD Sports Centre, Dublin

14 November 2015 (Series 3)

Moycullen	70–80	Templeogue

NUIG Kingfisher, Galway

14 November 2015 (Series 4)

Swords Thunder	78–59	Éanna

ALSAA, Dublin

14 November 2015 (Series 5)

Belfast Star	86–74	Killester

Methodist College, Belfast

4 December 2015 (Series 1)

UCC Demons	88–67	UL Eagles
UCC Demons win Series 1 on aggregate (170–120).

Mardyke Arena, Cork

5 December 2015 (Series 2)

DCU Saints	67–80	UCD Marian
UCD Marian win Series 2 on aggregate (196–152).

DCU Sports Complex, Dublin

5 December 2015 (Series 3)

Templeogue	79–78	Moycullen
Templeogue win Series 3 on aggregate (159–148).

Oblate Hall, Dublin

5 December 2015 (Series 4)

Éanna	86–92	Swords Thunder
Swords Thunder win Series 4 on aggregate (170–145).

Coláiste Éanna, Dublin

5 December 2015 (Series 5)

Killester	100–51	Belfast Star
Killester win Series 5 on aggregate (174–137).

IWA-Clontarf, Dublin

=== Round 2 (1 leg) ===
Winner of Series 2 vs Winner of Series 4

18 December 2015

Swords Thunder	80–70	UCD Marian

ALSAA, Dublin

=== Semi-finals ===
Winner of Series 1 vs Winner of Round 2

8 January 2016

UCC Demons	82–103	Swords Thunder

Mardyke Arena, Cork

Winner of Series 5 vs Winner of Series 3

9 January 2016

Killester	59–61	Templeogue

Mardyke Arena, Cork

=== Final ===
30 January 2016
20:00 GMT

Box Score Report

Swords Thunder	75–78	Templeogue
Scoring by quarter: 16–24, 23–4, 12–29, 24–21
Pts: Isaac Westbrooks (15); Rebs: Dan Nelms (13); Asts: Isaac Westbrooks (7)		Pts: Michael Bonaparte (21); Rebs: Jason Killeen (10); Asts: Sean Flood (5)

National Basketball Arena, Dublin
MVP: Michael Bonaparte

Source: Basketball Ireland, Comortais

== Awards ==
=== Player of the Month ===
Month	Player	Team	Ref
October	Michael Bonaparte	Templeogue	
November	Lehmon Colbert	UCC Demons	
December	Duane Johnson	DCU Saints	
January	Michael Bonaparte	Templeogue	
February	Jermaine Turner	Killester	

=== Coach of the Month ===
Month	Player	Team	Ref
October	Mark Keenan	Templeogue	
November	Colin O'Reilly	UCC Demons	
December	Neal McCotter	Belfast Star	
January	Mark Keenan	Templeogue	
February	Brian O'Malley	Killester	

=== Statistics leaders ===
Stats as of the end of the regular season

Category	Player	Team	Stat
Points per game	Duane Johnson	DCU Saints	26.2
Rebounds per game	Duane Johnson	DCU Saints	18.7
Assists per game	Isaac Westbrooks	Swords Thunder	9.1
Steals per game	Alexander Zurn	UCD Marian	4.6
Blocks per game	Alexander Zurn	UCD Marian	3.6

=== Regular season ===
- Player of the Year: Lehmon Colbert (UCC Demons)
- Young Player of the Year: Sean Flood (Templeogue)
- Coach of the Year: Brian O'Malley (Killester)
- All-Star First Picks:
  - Michael Bonaparte (Templeogue)
  - Lehmon Colbert (UCC Demons)
  - Duane Johnson (DCU Saints)
  - Jermaine Turner (Killester)
  - Shawn Vanzant (Belfast Star)
- All-Star Second Picks:
  - Staats Battle (UL Eagles)
  - Paul Dick (Killester)
  - Sean Flood (Templeogue)
  - Dan James (UCD Marian)
  - Isaac Westbrooks (Swords Thunder)
- All-Star Third Picks:
  - Paul Cummins (Templeogue)
  - Conor Grace (Templeogue)
  - Jason Killeen (Templeogue)
  - Dustan Moreira (UCD Marian)
  - Mārtiņš Provizors (DCU Saints)
