= 2014–15 Irish Premier League season =

- League: Premier League
- Sport: Basketball
- Duration: 4 October 2014 – 15 March 2015 (Regular season); 21 March 2015 – 29 March 2015 (Champions Trophy)
- Number of games: 18
- Number of teams: 10

Regular season
- League champions: UCC Demons
- Season MVP: Colin O'Reilly (UCC Demons)
- Top scorer: Ricky Taylor (Belfast Star) (26.2 ppg)

Tournaments
- Champions Trophy champions: UCC Demons
- Champions Trophy runners-up: Templeogue
- National Cup champions: UCC Demons
- National Cup runners-up: UCD Marian

Premier League seasons
- ← 2013–14 2015–16 →

The 2014–15 Irish Premier League season was the 42nd running of Basketball Ireland's premier men's basketball competition. The season featured 10 teams from across the Republic of Ireland and Northern Ireland, with the regular season beginning on 4 October 2014 and ending on 15 March 2015. In 2014–15, UCC Demons created history in Irish basketball by becoming the first side ever to remain undefeated for an entire season. They claimed the end-of-season Champions Trophy on 29 March 2015 to add to their League and Cup titles in a campaign that saw them win 24 games in a row. In a thrilling Champions Trophy final in Galway, Demons saw off Templeogue 85–73 behind the play of player-coach Colin O'Reilly.

== Teams ==
Team	Stadium	City/Area	Last season
Belfast Star	Methodist College	Belfast	6th
DCU Saints	DCU Sports Complex	Glasnevin, Dublin	4th
Dublin Inter	Mountview Y&C Club	Clonsilla, Dublin	8th
Killester	IWA Sports Hall	Clontarf, Dublin	1st
Neptune	Neptune Stadium	Cork	3rd
Swords Thunder	ALSAA Sports Complex	Dublin Airport, Dublin	New
Templeogue	Oblate Hall	Inchicore, Dublin	10th
UCC Demons	Mardyke Arena, UCC	Cork	2nd
UCD Marian	UCD Sports Centre	Belfield, Dublin	7th
UL Eagles	UL Arena	Limerick	5th

== Regular season ==
=== Standings ===
#	Irish Premier League Regular Season Standings					
#	Team	W	L	PCT	BP	PTS
1	UCC Demons	18	0	100	0	54
2	Swords Thunder	13	5	72	0	39
3	Templeogue	11	7	61	1	34
4	Killester	11	7	61	1	34
5	UCD Marian	9	9	50	4	31
6	Belfast Star	7	11	39	6	27
7	Neptune	7	11	39	1	22
8	DCU Saints	6	12	33	2	20
9	UL Eagles	5	13	28	4	19
10	Dublin Inter	3	15	17	3	12

Source: Comortais

== Champions Trophy ==
=== Bracket ===
Quarter-finals
4	Killester	75
Moycullen*	72
3	Templeogue	84
Maree**	61

Semi-finals
1	UCC Demons	73
4	Killester	71
2	Swords Thunder	73
3	Templeogue	81

Final
UCC Demons	85
Templeogue	73

*National League Division 1 champions.

**National League Division 1 runners-up.

=== Quarter-finals ===
21 March 2015
19:45 GMT

Maree	61–84	Templeogue
Pts: Padraig Burke (17)		Pts: Conor Grace (20)

Calasanctius College, Oranmore

21 March 2015

Moycullen	72–75	Killester
Pts: Kyle Cunningham (14)		Pts: John Behan (16)

=== Semi-finals ===
28 March 2015
14:00 GMT

Box Score

UCC Demons	73–71	Killester
Scoring by quarter: 20–11, 14–27, 22–15, 17–18
Pts: Lehmon Colbert (21); Rebs: Lehmon Colbert (11); Asts: Kyle Hosford (5)		Pts: Ciaran Roe (17); Rebs: Jermaine Turner (16); Asts: Ciaran Roe (7)

NUIG Kingfisher, Galway

28 March 2015
16:00 GMT

Box Score

Swords Thunder	73–81	Templeogue
Scoring by quarter: 16–21, 26–21, 13–18, 18–21
Pts: Tied (20); Rebs: Juan Torres (14); Asts: Isaac Westbrooks (5)		Pts: Jason Killeen (29); Rebs: Jason Killeen (16); Asts: Isaac Gordon (6)

NUIG Kingfisher, Galway

=== Final ===
YouTube

29 March 2015
16:00 GMT

Box Score

UCC Demons	85–73	Templeogue
Scoring by quarter: 22–23, 20–15, 20–15, 23–20
Pts: Colin O'Reilly (25); Rebs: Lehmon Colbert (10); Asts: Colin O'Reilly (3)		Pts: Lorcan Murphy (19); Rebs: Jason Killeen (8); Asts: Conor Grace (3)

NUIG Kingfisher, Galway
MVP: Colin O'Reilly

== National Cup ==
=== Round 1 (2 legs) ===
15 November 2014 (Series 1)

UCD Marian	95–77	Neptune

UCD Sports Centre, Dublin

15 November 2014 (Series 2)

UL Eagles	75–70	Dublin Inter

PESS Building, Limerick

15 November 2014 (Series 3)

Killester	63–88	UCC Demons

IWA-Clontarf, Dublin

15 November 2014 (Series 4)

DCU Saints	66–73	Templeogue

DCU Sports Complex, Dublin

16 November 2014 (Series 5)

Belfast Star	83–73	Swords Thunder

Methodist College, Belfast

6 December 2014 (Series 1)

Neptune	88–91	UCD Marian
UCD Marian win Series 1 on aggregate (186–165).

Neptune Stadium, Cork

6 December 2014 (Series 2)

Dublin Inter	73–71	UL Eagles
UL Eagles win Series 2 on aggregate (146–143).

Mountview Y&C Club, Dublin

6 December 2014 (Series 3)

UCC Demons	74–64	Killester
UCC Demons win Series 3 on aggregate (162–127).

Mardyke Arena, Cork

6 December 2014 (Series 4)

Templeogue	85–76	DCU Saints
Templeogue win Series 4 on aggregate (158–142).

Oblate Hall, Dublin

6 December 2014 (Series 5)

Swords Thunder	74–62	Belfast Star
Swords Thunder win Series 5 on aggregate (147–145).

ALSAA, Dublin

=== Round 2 (1 leg) ===
Winner of Series 4 vs Winner of Series 5

17 December 2014

Swords Thunder	82–59	Templeogue

ALSAA, Dublin

=== Semi-finals ===
Winner of Series 1 vs Winner of Series 2

9 January 2015

UCD Marian	81–70	UL Eagles

Mardyke Arena, Cork

Winner of Series 3 vs Winner of Round 2

9 January 2015

UCC Demons	95–70	Swords Thunder

Mardyke Arena, Cork

=== Final ===
24 January 2015
20:00 GMT

Report

UCD Marian	65–91	UCC Demons
Pts: Neil Baynes (20)		Pts: Lehmon Colbert (25)

National Basketball Arena, Dublin
MVP: Lehmon Colbert

Source: Comortais

== Awards ==
=== Player of the Month ===
Month	Player	Team	Ref
October	Colin O'Reilly	UCC Demons	
November	Ricky Taylor	Belfast Star	
December	Michael Goj	Swords Thunder	
January	Lehmon Colbert	UCC Demons	
February	Conor Meany	UCD Marian	
March	Jason Killeen	Templeogue	

=== Coach of the Month ===
Month	Player	Team	Ref
October	Colin O'Reilly	UCC Demons	
November	Dave Baker	Swords Thunder	
December	Ioannis Liapakis	UCD Marian	
January	Colin O'Reilly	UCC Demons	
February	Colin O'Reilly	UCC Demons	
March	Mark Keenan	Templeogue	

=== Statistics leaders ===
Stats as of the end of the regular season

Category	Player	Team	Stat
Points per game	Ricky Taylor	Belfast Star	26.2
Rebounds per game	Mārtiņš Provizors	DCU Saints	16.8
Assists per game	Isaac Westbrooks	Swords Thunder	9.6
Steals per game	Isaac Westbrooks	Swords Thunder	3.2
Blocks per game	Jason Killeen	Templeogue	2.4

=== Regular season ===
- Player of the Year: Colin O'Reilly (UCC Demons)
- Young Player of the Year: Ciaran Roe (Killester)
- Coach of the Year: Colin O'Reilly (UCC Demons)
- All-Star First Picks:
  - G: Kyle Hosford (UCC Demons)
  - G: Conor Meany (UCD Marian)
  - F: Ricky Taylor (Belfast Star)
  - F: Colin O'Reilly (UCC Demons)
  - C: Lehmon Colbert (UCC Demons)
- All-Star Second Picks:
  - G: Isaac Westbrooks (Swords Thunder)
  - G: Roy Downey (Neptune)
  - F: Michael Goj (Swords Thunder)
  - F: Juan Torres (Swords Thunder)
  - C: Jason Killeen (Templeogue)
- All-Star Third Picks:
  - G: Isaac Gordon (Templeogue)
  - G: Kevin Lacey (Swords Thunder)
  - F: Ciaran O'Sullivan (UCC Demons)
  - F: Michael Bonaparte (Neptune)
  - C: Jermaine Turner (Killester)
