= 2019–20 Irish Super League season =

- League: Super League
- Sport: Basketball
- Duration: 21 September 2019 – 8 March 2020 (Regular season)
- Games: 21
- Teams: 12

Regular season
- League champions: Belfast Star
- Season MVP: Delaney Blaylock (Belfast Star)
- Top scorer: Mike Bonaparte (DCU Saints) (24.6ppg)

Tournaments
- Champions Trophy champions: N/A
- Champions Trophy runners-up: N/A
- National Cup champions: Templeogue
- National Cup runners-up: Éanna

Super League seasons
- ← 2018–19 2020–21 →

The 2019–20 Irish Super League season was the 47th running of Basketball Ireland's premier men's basketball competition. The season featured 12 teams from across the Republic of Ireland and Northern Ireland. The regular season began on 21 September 2019 and was scheduled to end on 14 March 2020. However, on 11 March 2020, Basketball Ireland suspended the league with one round to go due to the COVID-19 pandemic. As a result, Belfast Star were declared the season champions.

== Teams ==
Team	Stadium	City/Area	Last season
Belfast Star	De La Salle College	Belfast	5th
DCU Saints	DCU Sports Complex	Glasnevin, Dublin	6th
Dublin Lions	Coláiste Bríde	Clondalkin, Dublin	New
Éanna	Coláiste Éanna	Rathfarnham, Dublin	New
Killester	IWA Sports Hall	Clontarf, Dublin	4th
Killorglin	Killorglin Sports Complex	Killorglin	9th
Maree	Calasanctius College	Oranmore	8th
Moycullen	Kingfisher, NUIG	Galway	10th
Neptune	Neptune Stadium	Cork	11th
Templeogue	Nord Anglia International School	Leopardstown, Dublin	2nd
Tralee Warriors	Tralee Sports Complex	Tralee	1st
UCD Marian	UCD Sports Centre	Belfield, Dublin	3rd

== League ==
The 2019–20 season was cut short by one round due to the COVID-19 pandemic, with Tralee Warriors initially finishing on top of the standings with a 17–4 record. However, due to Tralee committing an unintentional rule violation by playing an illegal player in December 2019, they were stripped of two wins (six points) and thus Belfast Star were declared the season champions.

=== Standings ===
Pos	Team	Pld	W	L	PF	PA	PD	Pts	
1	Belfast Star	21	16	5	1777	1605	+172	48	Qualification for Champions Trophy
2	Tralee Warriors	21	15	6	1635	1401	+234	45	Qualification for Champions Trophy
3	Éanna	21	14	7	1659	1541	+118	42	Qualification for Champions Trophy
4	UCD Marian	21	14	7	1625	1540	+85	42	Qualification for Champions Trophy
5	Templeogue	21	13	8	1800	1650	+150	39	Qualification for Champions Trophy
6	DCU Saints	21	10	11	1632	1676	−44	30	Qualification for Champions Trophy
7	Killester	21	10	11	1635	1687	−52	30	
8	Killorglin	21	10	11	1600	1716	−116	30	
9	Neptune	21	9	12	1801	1842	−41	27	
10	Maree	21	7	14	1583	1708	−125	21	
11	Moycullen	21	7	14	1540	1632	−92	21	Relegation to Division 1
12	Dublin Lions	21	1	20	1469	1758	−289	3	Relegation to Division 1

Updated to match(es) played on 8 March 2020. Source: Basketball Ireland

=== Results ===
Home \ Away	BEL	DCU	DUB	EAN	KIL	KLG	MAR	MOY	NEP	TEM	TW	UCD
Belfast Star	—	85–69	91–71	81–59	90–83	77–69	77–61	76–68	79–77	94–92	84–81	85–78
DCU Saints		—	87–81	70–55	75–83	85–70	72–73	78–91	74–80	89–79	60–104	82–73
Dublin Lions	61–102	70–78	—	54–76	67–70	76–93		63–48	82–96	59–76	70–76	53–75
Éanna	71–84	88–62	92–76	—	73–86	74–61	81–75	79–61	98–88		87–70	90–76
Killester	81–73	89–95	72–60	74–94	—	83–70	87–70	57–69	102–98	64–87	63–91	
Killorglin	81–79	79–77	76–64	71–90	88–79	—	87–84	87–84	101–100	54–67	79–74	64–87
Maree	59–76	73–78	87–84	76–64	81–84	73–78	—	87–79	80–89	83–71	67–87	77–89
Moycullen	96–89	64–87	89–83	81–82	69–60		58–70	—	68–71	75–70	61–79	66–71
Neptune	89–84	77–86	100–84	112–107	70–82	88–71	92–99	85–107	—	79–95		79–75
Templeogue		85–76	96–82	101–87	98–89	108–79	97–68	90–80	91–79	—	81–82	85–68
Tralee Warriors	93–86	103–78	96–54	80–77*	82–64	81–63	100–84	89–63	98–76	77–68	—	72–73
UCD Marian	87–95	75–73	82–75	82–92	97–83	86–79	78–56	79–73	79–76		76–86*	—

Updated to match(es) played on 8 March 2020. Source: Basketball Ireland
Legend: Blue = home team win; Red = away team win.

*Later declared 0–20 losses for Tralee Warriors due to playing an illegal player. As a result, Tralee Warriors dropped from 17–4 to 15–6, while UCD Marian and Éanna both moved from 13–8 to 14–7.

== National Cup ==
=== Round 1 ===
25 October 2019

Killorglin	60–83	Tralee Warriors

Killorglin Sports Complex, Killorglin

26 October 2019

Maree	75–90	Belfast Star

Calasanctius College, Oranmore

26 October 2019

Templeogue	82–62	UCD Marian

Nord Anglia International School, Dublin

26 October 2019

DCU Saints	68–57	Dublin Lions

St. Vincent's C.B.S., Dublin

=== Round 2 ===
30 November 2019

Belfast Star	63–78	Éanna

De La Salle College, Belfast

30 November 2019

Templeogue	95–82	Moycullen

Nord Anglia International School, Dublin

30 November 2019

DCU Saints	79–100	Neptune

St. Vincent's C.B.S., Dublin

30 November 2019

Tralee Warriors	76–64	Killester

Tralee Sports Complex, Tralee

=== Semi-finals ===
YouTube

11 January 2020
16:00 GMT

Report

Éanna	78–63	Tralee Warriors
Pts: Stefan Zečević (24)		Pts: Tied (14)

Neptune Stadium, Cork

YouTube

11 January 2020
20:00 GMT

Report

Templeogue	78–75	Neptune
Pts: Jason Killeen (21)		Pts: Nil Sabata (18)

Neptune Stadium, Cork

=== Final ===
25 January 2020
20:00 GMT

Report Box score

Éanna	68–78	Templeogue
Scoring by quarter: 19–24, 12–20, 23–19, 14–15
Pts: Joshua Wilson (16); Rebs: Stefan Zečević (12); Asts: Tied (4)		Pts: Lorcan Murphy (33); Rebs: Jason Killeen (9); Asts: Neil Randolph (6)

National Basketball Arena, Dublin
MVP: Lorcan Murphy

== Awards ==
=== Player of the Month ===
Month	Player	Team	Ref
October	Stefan Zečević	Éanna	
November	Stefan Zečević	Éanna	
December	Delaney Blaylock	Belfast Star	
January	Lorcan Murphy	Templeogue	
February	Delaney Blaylock	Belfast Star	
March			

=== Coach of the Month ===
Month	Player	Team	Ref
October	Darren McGovern	Éanna	
November	Lehmon Colbert	Neptune	
December	Adrian Fulton	Belfast Star	
January	Mark Keenan	Templeogue	
February	Adrian Fulton	Belfast Star	
March			

=== Statistics leaders ===
Stats as of the end of the regular season

Category	Player	Team	Stat
Points per game	Mike Bonaparte	DCU Saints	24.6
Rebounds per game	Mike Bonaparte	DCU Saints	15.8
Assists per game	Paul Dick	Tralee Warriors	9.0
Steals per game	Jonathan Lawton	Tralee Warriors	4.3
Blocks per game	Oisin Kerlin	Templeogue	2.3

=== Regular season ===
- Player of the Year: Delaney Blaylock (Belfast Star)
- Young Player of the Year: CJ Fulton (Belfast Star)
- Coach of the Year: Adrian Fulton (Belfast Star)
- All-Star First Team:
  - Delaney Blaylock (Belfast Star)
  - Lorcan Murphy (Templeogue)
  - Stefan Zečević (Éanna)
  - Paul Dick (Tralee Warriors)
  - CJ Fulton (Belfast Star)
- All-Star Second Team:
  - Mike Bonaparte (DCU Saints)
  - Mike Garrow (UCD Marian)
  - Allan Thomas (Killorglin)
  - Nil Sabata (Neptune)
  - Joshua Wilson (Éanna)
- All-Star Third Team:
  - Jason Killeen (Templeogue)
  - Jonathan Lawton (Tralee Warriors)
  - Darin Johnson (Maree)
  - Neil Randolph (Templeogue)
  - Tomas Fernandez (Killester)
