= 2017–18 Irish Super League season =

- League: Super League
- Sport: Basketball
- Duration: 15 September 2017 – 17 March 2018 (Regular season); 19 March 2018 – 24 March 2018 (Champions Trophy)
- Number of games: 21/22/23
- Number of teams: 12

Regular season
- League champions: UCD Marian
- Season MVP: Dee Proby (DCU Saints)
- Top scorer: Dee Proby (DCU Saints) (32.4 ppg)

Tournaments
- Champions Trophy champions: Tralee Warriors
- Champions Trophy runners-up: Templeogue
- National Cup champions: Templeogue
- National Cup runners-up: UCD Marian

Super League seasons
- ← 2016–17 2018–19 →

The 2017–18 Irish Super League season was the 45th running of Basketball Ireland's premier men's basketball competition. The season featured 12 teams from across the Republic of Ireland and Northern Ireland, with the regular season beginning on 15 September 2017 and ending on 17 March 2018 with UCD Marian claiming their first title in 40 years. Templeogue were victorious in the National Cup, while Tralee Warriors defended their Champions Trophy title.

== Teams ==
| Team | Stadium | City/Area | Last season |
|---|---|---|---|
| Belfast Star | Methodist College | Belfast | 10th |
| DCU Saints | DCU Sports Complex | Glasnevin, Dublin | 8th |
| Éanna | Coláiste Éanna | Rathfarnham, Dublin | 9th |
| Killester | IWA Sports Hall | Clontarf, Dublin | 5th |
| KUBS | Carroll Arena | Greendale, Dublin | 11th |
| Maree | Calasanctius College | Oranmore | New |
| Moycullen | Kingfisher, NUIG | Galway | 7th |
| Swords Thunder | ALSAA Sports Complex | Dublin Airport, Dublin | 2nd |
| Templeogue | Oblate Hall | Inchicore, Dublin | 1st |
| Tralee Warriors | Tralee Sports Complex | Tralee | 3rd |
| UCC Demons | Mardyke Arena, UCC | Cork | 6th |
| UCD Marian | UCD Sports Centre | Belfield, Dublin | 4th |

== Regular season ==
| Pos | Team | Pld | W | L | PF | PA | PD | Pts | Relegation |
|---|---|---|---|---|---|---|---|---|---|
| 1 | UCD Marian | 23 | 18 | 5 | 1863 | 1646 | +217 | 54 | |
| 2 | Killester | 23 | 17 | 6 | 1964 | 1692 | +272 | 51 | |
| 3 | Templeogue | 22 | 16 | 6 | 1939 | 1802 | +137 | 48 | |
| 4 | Tralee Warriors | 22 | 16 | 6 | 1761 | 1621 | +140 | 48 | |
| 5 | Swords Thunder | 22 | 14 | 8 | 1807 | 1575 | +232 | 42 | |
| 6 | UCC Demons | 22 | 13 | 9 | 1965 | 1852 | +113 | 39 | |
| 7 | Belfast Star | 21 | 9 | 12 | 1555 | 1535 | +20 | 27 | |
| 8 | Moycullen | 21 | 9 | 12 | 1649 | 1676 | −27 | 27 | |
| 9 | DCU Saints | 22 | 8 | 14 | 1738 | 1950 | −212 | 24 | |
| 10 | Maree | 22 | 6 | 16 | 1685 | 1954 | −269 | 18 | |
| 11 | Éanna | 22 | 4 | 18 | 1642 | 1823 | −181 | 12 | Relegated to Division I |
| 12 | KUBS | 22 | 2 | 20 | 1490 | 1932 | −442 | 6 | Relegated to Division I |

Source: Basketball Ireland

=== Regular season play-off final ===
A regular season play-off final was scheduled after Killester and UCD Marian finished joint first at the top of the table with 17 wins and five losses.

YouTube

17 March 2018
18:00 GMT

Preview Report

| Killester | 71–72 | UCD Marian |
| Pts: Luis Filiberto (27) | | Pts: Mike Garrow (19) |

National Basketball Arena, Dublin

== Champions Trophy ==
=== Bracket ===
Quarter-finals
4 | Tralee Warriors | 78
5 | Swords Thunder | 71
3 | Templeogue | 90
6 | UCC Demons | 77

Semi-finals
1 | UCD Marian | 78
4 | Tralee Warriors | 82
2 | Killester | 73
3 | Templeogue | 75

Final
Tralee Warriors | 73
Templeogue | 61

=== Quarter-finals ===
19 March 2018

Details Report

| Templeogue | 90–77 | UCC Demons |
| Pts: Neil Randolph (21) | | Pts: Lehmon Colbert (26) |

National Basketball Arena, Dublin

19 March 2018

Details Report

| Tralee Warriors | 78–71 | Swords Thunder |
| Pts: Goran Pantovic (19) | | Pts: Isaac Westbrooks (20) |

National Basketball Arena, Dublin

=== Semi-finals ===
21 March 2018

Details Report

| Killester | 73–75 (OT) | Templeogue |
| Pts: Royce Williams (20) | | Pts: Mike Bonaparte (30) |

National Basketball Arena, Dublin

22 March 2018

Details Report

| UCD Marian | 78–82 | Tralee Warriors |
| Pts: Mike Garrow (22) | | Pts: Paul Dick & Goran Pantovic (18) |

UL Arena, Limerick

=== Final ===
YouTube

24 March 2018
19:00 GMT

Details Box Score Report

| Tralee Warriors | 73–61 | Templeogue |
Scoring by quarter: 14–17, 22–15, 18–13, 19–16
| Pts: Paul Dick (22); Rebs: Kieran Donaghy (9); Asts: Paul Dick (6) | | Pts: Jason Killeen (22); Rebs: Jason Killeen (11); Asts: Mike Bonaparte (7) |

WIT Arena, Waterford
MVP: Paul Dick

== National Cup ==
=== Round 1 ===
21 October 2017

| Swords Thunder | 70–75 | DCU SaintsDCU Saints |

ALSAA, Dublin

21 October 2017

| KUBS | 47–101 | UCC Demons |

Carroll Arena, Dublin

21 October 2017

| Templeogue | 90–81 | Belfast Star |

Oblate Hall, Dublin

22 October 2017

| Moycullen | 79–71 | Maree |

Coláiste Iognáid, Galway

=== Round 2 ===
9 December 2017

| DCU Saints | 53–87 | UCD Marian |

DCU Sports Complex, Dublin

9 December 2017

| Templeogue | 81–76 | Éanna |

Oblate Hall, Dublin

10 December 2017

| Moycullen | 60–82 | Killester |

Coláiste Iognáid, Galway

13 December 2017

| UCC Demons | 69–64 | Tralee Warriors |

Parochial Hall, Cork

=== Semi-finals ===
YouTube

6 January 2018
18:00 GMT

Box Score Report

| Killester | 77–91 | UCD Marian |
Scoring by quarter: 24–25, 23–19, 15–26, 15–21
| Pts: Royce Williams (24); Rebs: Royce Williams (7); Asts: Ciaran Roe (9) | | Pts: Mike Garrow (19); Rebs: Tied (7); Asts: Mike Garrow (6) |

Mardyke Arena, Cork

YouTube

6 January 2018
20:00 GMT

Box Score Report

| UCC Demons | 77–98 | Templeogue |
Scoring by quarter: 24–28, 17–14, 21–22, 15–34
| Pts: Lehmon Colbert (29); Rebs: Adrian O'Sullivan (9); Asts: Tied (5) | | Pts: Lorcan Murphy (22); Rebs: Jason Killeen (10); Asts: Michael Bonaparte (9) |

Mardyke Arena, Cork

=== Final ===
27 January 2018
20:00 GMT

Box Score Report Report

| UCD Marian | 62–68 | Templeogue |
Scoring by quarter: 9–16, 21–16, 15–18, 17–18
| Pts: Conor Meany (16); Rebs: Neil Baynes (10); Asts: Tied (3) | | Pts: Lorcan Murphy (23); Rebs: Jason Killeen (13); Asts: Mike Bonaparte (6) |

National Basketball Arena, Dublin
MVP: Lorcan Murphy

Source: Basketball Ireland

== Awards ==
=== Player of the Month ===
| Month | Player | Team | Ref |
|---|---|---|---|
| September | Dee Proby | DCU Saints | |
| October | Dee Proby | DCU Saints | |
| November | Mike Garrow | UCD Marian | |
| December | Mike Garrow | UCD Marian | |
| January | Lorcan Murphy | Templeogue | |
| February | Trae Pemberton | Tralee Warriors | |
| March | Trae Pemberton | Tralee Warriors | |

=== Coach of the Month ===
| Month | Player | Team | Ref |
|---|---|---|---|
| September | Darren O'Neill | Belfast Star | |
| October | Mark Bernsen | Tralee Warriors | |
| November | Ioannis Liapakis | UCD Marian | |
| December | Brian O'Malley | Killester | |
| January | Mark Keenan | Templeogue | |
| February | Brian O'Malley | Killester | |
| March | Ioannis Liapakis | UCD Marian | |

=== Statistics leaders ===
Stats as of the end of the regular season

| Category | Player | Team | Stat |
|---|---|---|---|
| Points per game | Dee Proby | DCU Saints | 32.4 |
| Rebounds per game | Dee Proby | DCU Saints | 19.3 |
| Assists per game | Scott Kinevane | UCD Marian | 8.6 |
| Steals per game | Dan James | UCD Marian | 3.8 |
| Blocks per game | Jason Killeen | Templeogue | 2.5 |

=== Regular season ===
- Player of the Year: Dee Proby (DCU Saints)
- Young Player of the Year: Eoin Rockall (Maree)
- Coach of the Year: Ioannis Liapakis (UCD Marian)
- All-Star First Team:
  - Ciaran Roe (Killester)
  - Adrian O'Sullivan (UCC Demons)
  - Royce Williams (Killester)
  - Dee Proby (DCU Saints)
  - Jason Killeen (Templeogue)
- All-Star Second Team:
  - Trae Pemberton (Tralee Warriors)
  - Conor Meany (UCD Marian)
  - Lorcan Murphy (Templeogue)
  - Mike Garrow (UCD Marian)
  - Luis Filiberto Hoyos (Killester)
- All-Star Third Team:
  - Isaac Westbrooks (Swords Thunder)
  - Neil Randolph (Templeogue)
  - Dan James (UCD Marian)
  - Kieran Donaghy (Tralee Warriors)
  - Lehmon Colbert (UCC Demons)
