= Lehmon Colbert =

American basketball player (born 1988)

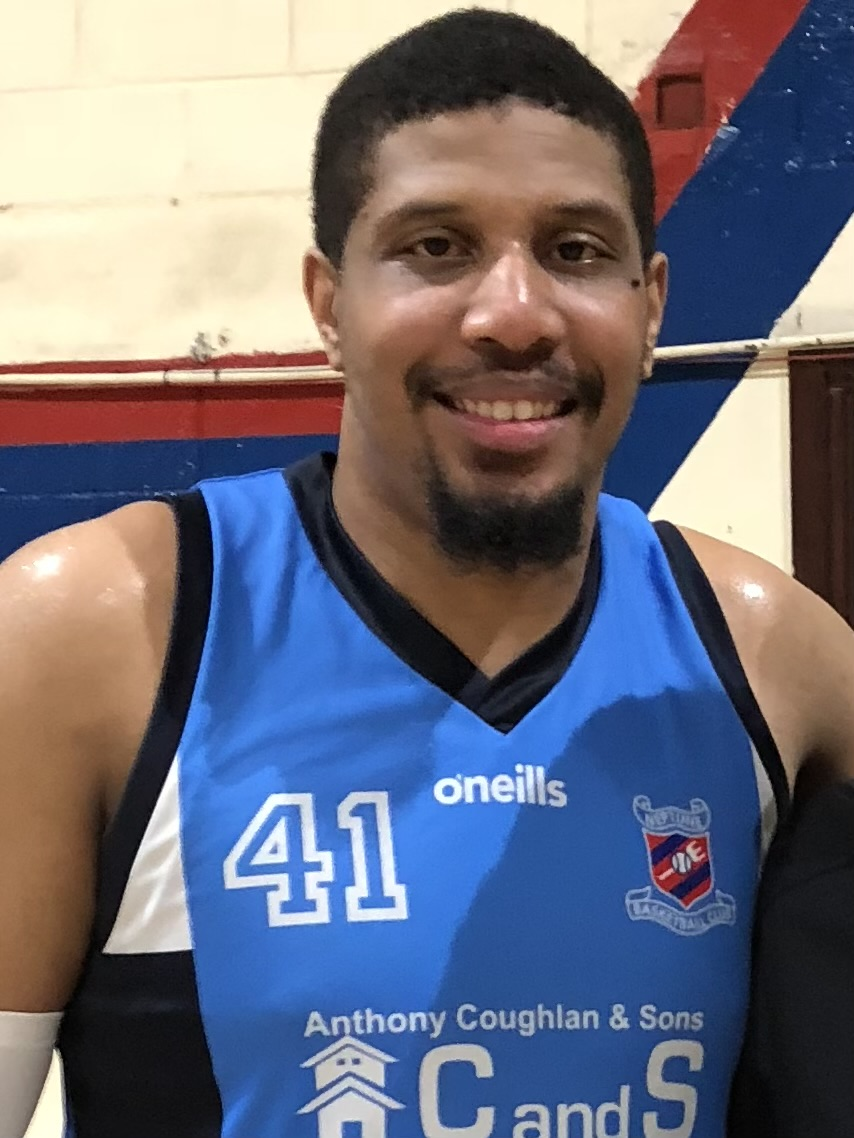
- Colbert with Neptune in 2018

Personal information
- Born: April 14, 1988 (age 38) Georgia, United States
- Listed height: 2.00 m (6 ft 7 in)

Career information
- High school: Crawford County (Roberta, Georgia)
- College: Jacksonville (2006–2010)
- NBA draft: 2010: undrafted
- Playing career: 2010–2020
- Position: Power forward / center

Career history

Playing
- 2010–2012: Plymouth Raiders
- 2013: Leñadores de Madera
- 2013–2016: UCC Demons
- 2015: →Hibernia
- 2017–2018: UCC Demons
- 2018–2020: Neptune

Coaching
- 2019–2020: Neptune

Career highlights
- 2× Irish League champion (2015, 2016); Irish League Player of the Year (2016); 2× Irish League All-Star First Team (2015, 2016); Irish League All-Star Third Team (2018); 3× Irish Champions Trophy winner (2014–2016); Irish Champions Trophy Final MVP (2016); 2× Irish National Cup winner (2014, 2015); 2× Irish National Cup Final MVP (2014, 2015); Second-team All-Atlantic Sun (2010); Atlantic Sun All-Freshman Team (2007)

Lehmon Colbert Jr. (born April 14, 1988) is an American former professional basketball player. He played college basketball for the Jacksonville Dolphins before playing professionally in England, Mexico and Ireland. With UCC Demons in the Irish Super League, he won two championships and multiple other trophies and was the league's Player of the Year in 2016. Between 2018 and 2020, he played for Neptune and served as player-coach in his second season.

== Early life ==
Colbert was born and raised in the state of Georgia. He initially leaned towards baseball before his height and strength saw him gravitate towards basketball.

== High school career ==
Colbert attended Crawford County High School in Roberta, Georgia. As a senior in 2005–06, he averaged 25 points, 13 rebounds, six assists, four steals and three blocks per game. He was named second-team all-state in Class 2A as a junior, and first-team all-state in Class 2A as a senior.

On April 12, 2006, Colbert signed a National Letter of Intent to play college basketball for Jacksonville University.

== College career ==
=== Freshman year (2006–07) ===
As a freshman at Jacksonville in 2006–07, Colbert played in all 29 games with 28 starting assignments. He was named to the Atlantic Sun All-Freshman Team after finishing second on the team in scoring (11.7 ppg) and rebounding (5.2 rpg). He scored in double figures 18 times, including the final three games of the season. He had two double-doubles – the first a 14-point, 10-rebound performance against Campbell on January 4; the final was a 17-point, 11-rebound outing against Lipscomb on February 26.

=== Sophomore year (2007–08) ===
As a sophomore in 2007–08, Colbert started all 31 games for the Dolphins, finishing third on the team in scoring (13.1) and second in rebound (6.3). He scored in double figures 24 times, going for 20 points or more three times. He scored a career-high 24 points against Belmont on February 7, hitting 10-of-16 from the floor while dishing out five assists. He had at least five assists in a game five times, including a career-high eight against ETSU on January 25. He had two double-doubles during the season, the first coming against Concordia on November 17 (12 points, 12 rebounds) and the other against Mercer on February 21 (17 points, 10 rebounds).

=== Junior year (2008–09) ===
As a junior in 2008–09, Colbert played in all 32 games with 31 starting assignments, finishing second on the team in scoring and rebounding, averaging 11.8 points and 6.2 rebounds per game. He scored in double figures 22 times, going for 20 or more in a game twice, and became the 26th member of the school's 1,000-point club. He scored a career-high 28 points against Stetson on January 23, hitting 9-of-12 from the floor and 5-for-5 from behind the arc. He had two double-doubles, coming in back-to-back games – the first was a 15-point, 11-rebound performance against Florida Gulf Coast on January 25, followed by a 16-point, 11-rebound outing against ETSU on January 30. He had a career-high 13 rebounds in the A-Sun championship game against ETSU on March 7.

=== Senior year (2009–10) ===
Colbert suffered a knee injury early in his senior season. As a result, he missed five games throughout the season. Despite this, on March 2, 2010, Colbert made his first All-Conference team, placing on the Second Team.

The Dolphins came up short in their bid to win the Atlantic Sun Conference tournament and earn a berth in the NCAA Tournament. But by gaining a share of the regular season title along with Belmont, Lipscomb and Campbell and then advancing further in the A-Sun Tournament than any of the other three co-champions, JU was able to gain a berth in the NIT for the second year in a row.

In 28 games (26 starts) for the Dolphins in 2009–10, Colbert averaged 12.1 points, 6.8 rebounds and 1.5 assists in 28.5 minutes per game.

Over four seasons at Jacksonville, Colbert and teammate Ben Smith were the most prolific 1-2 scoring threat in school history. Smith finished his career with 1,971 points, the second-highest point total ever for a Dolphins player, while Colbert wound up in 13th with 1,460 points.

=== College statistics ===
Year	Team	GP	GS	MPG	FG%	3P%	FT%	RPG	APG	SPG	BPG	PPG
2006–07	Jacksonville	29	28	28.7	.500	.361	.595	5.2	1.1	.6	.5	11.7
2007–08	Jacksonville	31	31	31.0	.470	.250	.678	6.3	2.6	.7	.5	13.1
2008–09	Jacksonville	32	31	26.7	.457	.415	.688	6.2	1.7	.5	.6	11.8
2009–10	Jacksonville	28	26	28.5	.444	.283	.647	6.8	1.5	.6	.5	12.1
Career		120	116	28.7	.467	.330	.658	6.1	1.8	.6	.5	12.2

== Professional career ==
=== Plymouth Raiders (2010–2012) ===
==== 2010–11 season ====
After college, Colbert was aware that his chance of becoming an NBA player was slim to none. Despite this, he committed to a basketball career by hiring an agent and moving overseas.

On August 27, 2010, Colbert signed with the Plymouth Raiders of the British Basketball League. His athleticism and versatility set him apart from other small forwards in the BBL during the 2010–11 season, with his ability to play both small forward and power forward an impressive trait that coach Gavin Love exploited. Colbert was one of the top rookies in the BBL in 2010–11. He averaged 15 points and nearly seven rebounds a game, while handing out just over three assists and averaging just under a steal per game. He shot 60% from the floor and 32% from the three-point line, demonstrating his versatility. Plymouth reached the end-of-season playoffs, before falling to the Cheshire Jets in the first round.

==== 2011–12 season ====
On May 26, 2011, Colbert re-signed with the Raiders for the 2011–12 season. Colbert helped the Raiders reach the final of both the BBL Cup and the BBL Trophy, losing both to the Newcastle Eagles. In the Cup final on January 15, 2012, Colbert scored 25 points.

In 83 games for Plymouth over two seasons, Colbert averaged 14.5 points, 7.0 rebounds and 3.0 assists per game.

=== Mexico (2013) ===
"Luckily I got two years with Plymouth in England but last year I didn't get a job, so I had to go to Mexico… that was strange, very, very crazy. I wouldn't wish it on anybody. You had to be sober down there. It's a dangerous country. I saw police coming out of the back of pick-up trucks with Tommy Guns."

— Colbert, January 2014

After failing to secure a contract for the 2012–13 season, Colbert played in Mexico in 2013 with Leñadores de Madera of the LiMeBa Liga. He averaged 28.4 points, 10.0 rebounds, 6.1 assists, 1.0 steals and 1.2 blocks per game.

=== UCC Demons (2013–2018) ===
==== 2013–14 season ====
In September 2013, Colbert signed with UCC Demons for the 2013–14 Irish Premier League season. Player-coach Colin O'Reilly recruited Colbert after the two knew each other from their time in England.

On January 24, 2014, Colbert helped Demons defeat Dublin Inter 82–64 in the National Cup final, earning MVP honors behind a 21-point effort. He went on to help Demons finish the regular season in second place with a 16–2 record before winning the end-of-season Champions Trophy tournament with a 79–60 win over Killester in the final. In the final, Colbert recorded 16 points, 12 rebounds, four assists, one steal and two blocks. In 18 regular-season games, he averaged 19.8 points, 11.0 rebounds, 2.6 assists and 1.1 blocks per game.

==== 2014–15 season ====
Colbert returned to UCC Demons for the 2014–15 season. On January 24, 2015, Colbert helped Demons defeat UCD Marian 91–65 in the National Cup final, earning MVP honors for the second straight year behind a game-high 25 points. Two weeks later, he was named Player of the Month for January.

UCC Demons finished the regular season in first place with a perfect 18–0 record, garnering their seventh league title. In 18 games, Colbert averaged 22.6 points, 10.2 rebounds, 2.7 assists and 1.0 steals per game. On March 26, 2015, he was named an inaugural Premier League All-Star First Pick alongside teammates Kyle Hosford and Colin O'Reilly. Three days later, he recorded 23 points and 10 rebounds in Demons' Champions Trophy final win over Templeogue. The win created history in Irish basketball as Demons became the first side ever to remain undefeated for an entire season – a campaign that saw them win 24 games in a row.

==== 2015–16 season ====
Colbert returned to UCC Demons for the 2015–16 season. Between October and December, he competed for Hibernia in the 2015–16 FIBA Europe Cup. In Hibernia's fourth game of the tournament, Colbert recorded 20 points and 10 rebounds against the Bakken Bears. In six games, he averaged 13.3 points, 5.3 rebounds, 1.7 assists and 1.2 steals per game.

UCC Demons won their second consecutive league title in 2015–16 after finishing the regular season in first place with a 16–2 record. Colbert appeared in all 18 games for the third straight year, averaging career highs of 23.4 points and 12.3 rebounds, as well as 2.8 assists and 1.1 blocks in 34.3 minutes per game. On March 19, 2016, he recorded 35 points and 17 rebounds in Demons' 75–71 Champions Trophy semi-final win over UCD Marian. The next day, he recorded 27 points and 16 rebounds in Demons' 82–77 Champions Trophy final win over Killester, as he claimed game MVP honors and his third Champions Trophy title in three seasons. In June 2016, he was named Men's Premier League Player of the Year. He was also named a Premier League All-Star First Pick for the second year in a row.

==== 2017–18 season ====
After sitting out the 2016–17 season in the United States, Colbert returned to UCC Demons for the 2017–18 season. He was unable to play in the team's first two games of the season however due to his work permit still being processed. He made his season debut on October 1 against Swords Thunder. Colbert helped Demons reach the National Cup semi-finals, but despite his game-high 29 points, they were defeated 98–77 by Templeogue on January 6. Throughout the season, he had four games with 30 points or more, including a season-high 35 in his season debut. UCC Demons finished in sixth place with a 13–9 record. In 20 games, Colbert averaged 22.75 points, 10.05 rebounds, 2.55 assists, 1.4 steals and 1.15 blocks per game. He was subsequently named to the All-Star Third Team.

=== Neptune (2018–2020) ===
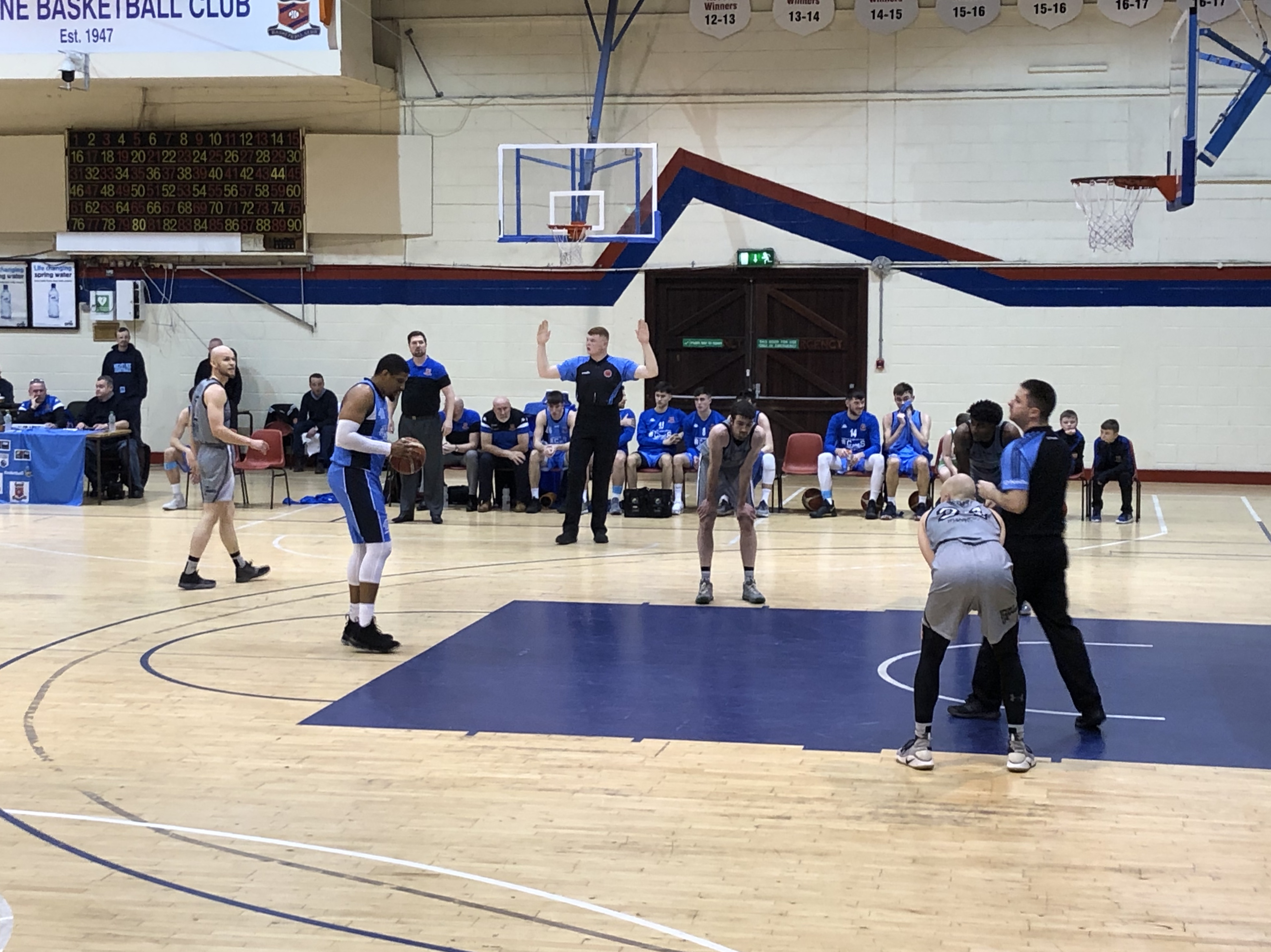
Colbert in December 2018, at the free throw line for Neptune

After four seasons with UCC Demons, Colbert was ready to commit to a fifth season before it became clear to him that he wasn't in the coach's plans. As a result, Colbert joined cross-town rivals Neptune for the 2018–19 season. On November 24, 2018, he had 21 points and 20 rebounds against UCD Marian. On December 8, he had 30 points and 15 rebounds against Swords Thunder. On February 16, 2019, he had 20 rebounds against Belfast Star. Neptune finished on the bottom of the table with a 4–16 record. In 21 games, he averaged 17.9 points, 10.95 rebounds, 1.9 assists and 1.33 blocks per game.

For the 2019–20 season, Colbert was appointed player-coach of Neptune. He missed time as a player in November due to an elbow injury, but made up for it by being named Super League Coach of the Month for November. On February 1, he scored a season-high 24 against Éanna. Neptune recorded a 9–12 record in 2019–20 to finish ninth, as Colbert averaged 16.2 points, 8.8 rebounds, 2.4 assists and 1.1 blocks in 17 games.

Colbert parted ways with Neptune in July 2020.

== Personal ==
Colbert is the youngest of six children to mother Irene and father Lehmon Sr., who died when Colbert was 18. His daughter, Kyla, was born in 2011.
