= 2012–13 Irish SuperLeague season =

- League: SuperLeague
- Sport: Basketball
- Duration: 28 September 2012 – 9 March 2013 (Regular season); 15 March 2013 – 23 March 2013 (Champions Trophy)
- Number of games: 21
- Number of teams: 8

Regular season
- League champions: UL Eagles
- Season MVP: Ger Noonan (Neptune)
- Top scorer: Patrick Sullivan (Moycullen) (23.3 ppg)

Tournaments
- Champions Trophy champions: UCC Demons
- Champions Trophy runners-up: DCU Saints
- National Cup champions: Neptune
- National Cup runners-up: UL Eagles

SuperLeague seasons
- ← 2011–12 2013–14 →

The 2012–13 Irish SuperLeague season was the 40th running of Basketball Ireland's premier men's basketball competition. The season featured 8 teams from across the Republic of Ireland, with the regular season beginning on 28 September 2012 and ending on 9 March 2013. With a first-place finish and a 16–5 win–loss record, UL Eagles were crowned league champions for the second straight year. Neptune were crowned National Cup champions for the first time in 21 years, while UCC Demons won the inaugural season finale Champions Trophy tournament.

== Teams ==
Team	Stadium	City/Area	Last season
DCU Saints	DCU Sports Complex	Glasnevin, Dublin	1st (North)
Dublin Inter	National Basketball Arena	Tallaght, Dublin	New
Killester	IWA Sports Hall	Clontarf, Dublin	2nd (North)
Moycullen	Kingfisher, NUIG	Galway	4th (South)
Neptune	Neptune Stadium	Cork	2nd (South)
UCC Demons	Mardyke Arena, UCC	Cork	1st (South)
UCD Marian	UCD Sports Centre	Belfield, Dublin	3rd (North)
UL Eagles	UL Arena	Limerick	3rd (South)

== Regular season ==
=== Standings ===
#	Irish SuperLeague Regular Season Standings				
#	Team	W	L	PCT	PTS
1	UL Eagles	16	5	76	53
2	Neptune	13	8	62	47
3	UCC Demons	13	8	62	47
4	DCU Saints	11	10	52	43
5	Killester	10	11	48	41
6	Moycullen	8	13	38	37
7	UCD Marian	8	13	38	37
8	Dublin Inter	5	16	24	29

Source: SportsNewsIRELAND

== Champions Trophy ==
=== Bracket ===
Semi-finals
1	UL Eagles	75
4	DCU Saints	83
2	Neptune	74
3	UCC Demons	79

Final
DCU Saints	62
UCC Demons	73

=== Semi-finals ===
15 March 2013
18:45 GMT

Report

Neptune	74–79	UCC Demons
Pts: Darren Townes (15)		Pts: Ciaran O'Sullivan (23)

Mardyke Arena, Cork

15 March 2013
20:45 GMT

Report

UL Eagles	75–83	DCU Saints
Pts: Robert Taylor (18)		Pts: Mārtiņš Provizors (13)

Mardyke Arena, Cork

Source: RTE

=== Final ===
23 March 2013
19:00 GMT

Stats

DCU Saints	62–73	UCC Demons
Pts: Keith Anderson (13)		Pts: Ciaran O'Sullivan (18)

National Basketball Arena, Dublin
MVP: Shane Coughlan

Source: RTE

== National Cup ==
=== Semi-finals ===
11 January 2013
19:00 GMT

Preview Stats

UCC Demons	71–76	Neptune
Pts: Kenton Walker (27)		Pts: Darren Townes (21)

Neptune Stadium, Cork

11 January 2013
21:00 GMT

Preview Stats

UL Eagles	58–50	UCD Marian
Pts: Neil Campbell (15)		Pts: Thomas Viglianco (14)

Neptune Stadium, Cork

=== Final ===
25 January 2013
20:45 GMT

Preview Report Report

UL Eagles	65–85	Neptune
Pts: Neil Campbell (18)		Pts: Michael McGinn (28)

National Basketball Arena, Dublin
MVP: Michael McGinn

== SuperLeague Select Team ==
=== Ireland vs England ===
In January 2013, the SuperLeague Select Team travelled to Birmingham, England to play against the England Select Team in the BBL Cup Final curtain-raiser. The match took place at the National Indoor Arena on Sunday 13 January, with tip off at 12:30pm.

==== Team ====
- Shane Coughlan (UCC Demons)
- Niall O'Reilly (UCC Demons)
- Robert Taylor (UL Eagles)
- Jason Killeen (UL Eagles)
- Rob Lynch (UL Eagles)
- Neil Campbell (UL Eagles)
- Darren Townes (Neptune)
- Michael McGinn (Neptune)
- Ger Noonan (Neptune)
- Mindaugas Tamušauskas (Dublin Inter)
- Keith Anderson (DCU Saints)
- Mike Westbrooks (Killester)
- Cian Nihill (reserve player) (Moycullen)

Head Coach: Mark Keenan (UL Eagles)
Assistant Coaches: Jerome Westbrooks (Killester) and John King

==== Game data ====
Highlights Replay

13 January 2013
12:30 GMT

Report Box Score

England Select	80–83	SuperLeague Select
Scoring by quarter: 21–20, 26–26, 17–14, 16–23
Pts: Tayo Ogedengbe (33); Rebs: Mike Tuck (12); Asts: Devan Bailey (6)		Pts: Mindaugas Tamušauskas (17); Rebs: Jason Killeen (12); Asts: Robert Taylor (4)

National Indoor Arena, Birmingham

== Awards ==
=== Player of the Month ===
Month	Player	Team
October	Pat Glover	DCU Saints
November	Robert Taylor	UL Eagles
December	Shane Coughlan	UCC Demons
January	Michael McGinn	Neptune
February	Dan James	UCD Marian
March	Shane Coughlan	UCC Demons

=== Coach of the Month ===
Month	Player	Team	Ref
October	Paul Kelleher	UCC Demons	
November	Mark Keenan	UL Eagles	
December	Mark Scannell	Neptune	
January	Mark Scannell	Neptune	
February	Salva Camps	Moycullen	
March	Dave Donnelly	DCU Saints	

=== Statistics leaders ===
Category	Player	Team	Stat
Points per game	Patrick Sullivan	Moycullen	23.3
Rebounds per game	John Galvin	UCD Marian	17.4
Assists per game	Ger Noonan	Neptune	8.2
Steals per game	Robert Taylor	UL Eagles	2.7
Blocks per game	John Galvin	UCD Marian	2.9

=== Regular season ===
- Player of the Year: Ger Noonan (Neptune)
- Young Player of the Year: Keith Anderson (DCU Saints)
- Coach of the Year: Mark Scannell (Neptune)
