= Tralee Tigers =

Tralee Tigers was an Irish basketball team based in Tralee, County Kerry. The team competed in the SuperLeague and were champions in 1995–96, 2003–04 and 2007–08. They also won the Irish National Championship in 2001–02, and won two National Cup titles in 2005 and 2007. The team folded following the 2008–09 season.

Tralee Tigers' biggest star was dual Gaelic footballer and basketball player Kieran Donaghy. Donaghy helped Tralee win the 2005 National Cup and was named the player of the year. In 2008, Donaghy and Micheal Quirke carried Tralee on their backs with both Americans fouled out to beat a stacked Killester team in the league final. Donaghy scored 22 points in the final, a day after scoring 24 points in the semi-final against Neptune. In January 2015, both Donaghy and Quirke, as well as John Teahan, were ranked in the top 25 of Ireland's greatest ever male basketball players.
