= CJ Fulton =

Irish basketball player (born 2002)

No. 6 – Kangoeroes Basket Mechelen
- Position: Point guard
- League: BNXT League

Personal information
- Born: 24 June 2002 (age 24) Belfast, Northern Ireland
- Listed height: 6 ft 2 in (1.88 m)
- Listed weight: 185 lb (84 kg)

Career information
- High school: St Malachy's College (Belfast, Northern Ireland)
- College: Lafayette (2021–2023); Charleston (2023–2025)
- NBA draft: 2025: undrafted
- Playing career: 2018–present

Career history
- 2018–2020: Belfast Star
- 2025–2026: Iowa Wolves
- 2026–present: Kangoeroes Basket Mechelen

Career highlights
- Irish Super League champion (2020); Third-team All-CAA (2025); Third-team All-Patriot League (2023); Patriot League All-Freshman team (2022); Irish Super League All-Star First Team (2020); 2× Irish Super League Young Player of the Year (2019, 2020)
- Stats at NBA.com
- Stats at Basketball Reference
Medals
Men's basketball
Representing Ireland
FIBA European Championship for Small Countries
| Gold medal – first place | 2021 Dublin | Team |

Christopher "CJ" Fulton (born 24 June 2002) is an Irish professional basketball player for Kangoeroes Basket Mechelen of the BNXT League. He played college basketball with the Lafayette Leopards and the Charleston Cougars.

== Early life and youth career ==
Christopher Fulton was born in Belfast, Northern Ireland to parents Adrian and Jackie Fulton on 24 June 2002. His father Adrian played basketball for the Irish National Team and the Belfast Star, and currently serves as the Star's head coach. His grandfather, Danny Fulton, served as the head coach of the National Team and the Belfast Star, winning two Super League titles with the latter. His great-grandfather, Bertie Fulton, was the first footballer from Northern Ireland to ever compete at the Olympic Games, as he represented Great Britain at the 1936 Summer Olympics.

Fulton played basketball for St Malachy's College in Belfast, winning nine National Championships (2014–20) and two Finals MVP's (2018 and 2019) with the school. He spent his senior year at The Winchendon School in Boston, Massachusetts so NCAA basketball coaches could watch him play.

While still in school, Fulton played two seasons for the Belfast Star in the Irish Super League from 2018 to 2020. He was named Young Player of the Year for the 2018–19 season, in which he averaged 9.2 points and 5.4 assists per game. Fulton was again named Young Player of the Year for the 2019–20 season, after improving to average 17.5 points and 7.5 assists per game, winning an All-Star First Team Selection and the league championship at the end of the season.

== College career ==
=== Lafayette Leopards ===
Fulton received a scholarship to play for the Lafayette Leopards in Easton, Pennsylvania to begin his collegiate career. During his freshman year, he averaged 7.3 points and 3.3 assists per game, earning a spot on the Patriot League All-Rookie Team. Fulton improved his scoring and ball handling for his sophomore year, ultimately averaging 10.4 points and 5.0 assists per game en route to a Third Team All-Patriot League selection. His career 4.2 assists per game and 24.7 assist percentage both rank fourth in Lafayette program history.

=== Charleston Cougars ===
Fulton transferred to the Charleston Cougars in Charleston, South Carolina for his junior year. His 4.1 points and 4.1 assists per game helped the 2023–24 Cougars reach the NCAA Tournament for the second year in a row, while he led the nation with a 4.1 to 1.0 assist-to-turnover ratio. Fulton averaged 7.8 points and a career-high 6.5 assists per game during his senior season, once again leading the nation with a 5.0 to 1.0 assist-to-turnover ratio and earning a spot on the All-CAA Third Team. Fulton dished out his 500th career assist during an 87–85 victory over Northeastern on 18 January 2025, and would later earn his 600th during the penultimate game of the season. He graduated with the program records for most career assists per game (5.3) and the highest career assist percentage (30.2) in Charleston basketball history.

During four years of collegiate basketball Fulton played under five different head coaches; Fran O'Hanlon, Mike Jordan, and Mike McGarvey at Lafayette, along with Pat Kelsey and Chris Mack at Charleston.

== Professional career ==
=== Iowa Wolves (2025–2026) ===
After going undrafted in the 2025 NBA draft, Fulton joined the Minnesota Timberwolves for the 2025 NBA Summer League. On 24 September 2025, he signed an Exhibit 10 contract to play for the Timberwolves or their G League affiliate, the Iowa Wolves. He became the first player developed in Ireland, and the second born in Ireland, to sign a contract with an NBA team. On 6 November 2025, Fulton was named to the Iowa Wolves opening night roster. He averaged 2.2 points, 1.2 assists, and 0.9 rebounds across 18 games off of the bench.

=== Kangoeroes Basket Mechelen (2026–present) ===
On July 2, 2026, Fulton signed with Kangoeroes Basket Mechelen of the BNXT League.

== National team career ==
Fulton represented Ireland's U16 national team at the 2017 and 2018 FIBA U16 European Championships, as well as the U18 national team at the 2019 FIBA U18 European Championship. He made his official senior national team debut during the 2021 FIBA European Championship for Small Countries, where he averaged 4.5 points and 3.5 assists to help Ireland win the gold medal.

== Career statistics ==
Legend
| GP | Games played | GS | Games started | MPG | Minutes per game |
| FG% | Field goal percentage | 3P% | 3-point field goal percentage | FT% | Free throw percentage |
| RPG | Rebounds per game | APG | Assists per game | SPG | Steals per game |
| BPG | Blocks per game | PPG | Points per game | **Bold** | Career high |

=== College ===
| Year | Team | GP | GS | MPG | FG% | 3P% | FT% | RPG | APG | SPG | BPG | PPG |
|---|---|---|---|---|---|---|---|---|---|---|---|---|
| 2021–22 | Lafayette | 30 | 27 | 29.4 | **.445** | .368 | .737 | 3.9 | 3.3 | 1.4 | **0.1** | 7.3 |
| 2022–23 | Lafayette | 30 | 29 | **36.4** | .426 | **.387** | **.857** | **5.1** | 5.0 | **2.0** | **0.1** | **10.4** |
| 2023–24 | Charleston | **35** | 25 | 23.9 | .402 | .337 | .684 | 3.1 | 4.1 | 1.0 | 0.0 | 4.1 |
| 2024–25 | Charleston | 32 | **31** | 33.5 | .426 | .377 | .837 | 4.1 | **6.5** | 1.5 | 0.0 | 7.8 |
| Career | | 127 | 112 | 30.6 | .427 | .371 | .798 | 4.0 | 4.7 | 1.5 | 0.0 | 7.3 |
