= Irish Premier League =

Irish Premier League may refer to:

- NIFL Premiership, formerly the Irish Premier League, a Northern Ireland association football league
- Super League (Ireland), formerly the Premier League, an Irish basketball league

== See also ==
- League of Ireland Premier Division, a Republic of Ireland association football league
