= Shamrock Rovers Hoops =

- Founded: 1995
- Folded: 2010
- History: Denny Notre Dame; 1995–2000; Big Al's Notre Dame; 2000–2004; Shamrock Rovers Hoops; 2004–2010
- Arena: National Basketball Arena
- Location: Tallaght, Dublin, Ireland
- Team colors: Green & white

The Shamrock Rovers Hoops were an Irish basketball team based in Tallaght, Dublin. Rovers competed in the Superleague and played their home games at the National Basketball Arena. They were affiliated with Shamrock Rovers F.C., who were nicknamed The Hoops.

Originally known as Denny Notre Dame, the team won four consecutive National Cup titles between 1997 and 2000. Notre Dame also won the Irish National Championship in 2000. The team became known as Shamrock Rovers Hoops in 2004 and competed in the Superleague until 2010 when they withdrew from the 2010–11 season due to financial constraints.

== See also ==
- Basketball Ireland
- Shamrock Rovers F.C.
