= Templeogue Basketball Club =

Basketball club in Dublin in Ireland

- Founded: 1976
- Arena: TUD Tallaght
- Location: Dublin, Ireland
- Team colors: Red & white
- Website: TBC.ie

Templeogue Basketball Club is an Irish basketball club based in Dublin. The club's senior men's team has previously played in the Irish Super League.

== History ==
Templeogue Basketball Club was established in 1976 by a group of Past Pupils from Templeogue College. It was not until 2012 that a senior men's team entered one of Ireland's national competitions. For the 2012–13 season, Templeogue entered the National League Division 1 and made their debut on 29 September 2012 against Ulster Elks. After losing their season opener, they won their first match two weeks later. Between October and February, Templeogue remained unbeaten thanks to American import Isaac Gordon. They finished as Division 1 Northern Conference runners-up in 2012–13.

In 2013, Templeogue were admitted into the Premier League for the 2013–14 season. The team recruited Conor and Daniel James from UCD Marian to team up with their younger brother Stephen. Their first season in the top league ended with just one win in eighteen games.

The 2014–15 season saw Templeogue's Premier League team climb the ladder. After starting their campaign with three straight defeats, Templeogue bounced back to finish the regular season in third place with an 11–7 record. Their strong form at the back end of the season saw coach Mark Keenan and centre Jason Killeen win Coach and Player of the Month respectively for March 2015. They went on to reach the Champions Trophy final, where they were defeated 85–73 by UCC Demons.

In 2015–16, Templeogue were undefeated over their first 10 games, but stumbled over their final eight to finish the regular season in third place with a 14–4 record. Their form over the first half of the season saw them reach the National Cup final. There they defeated Swords Thunder 78–75 to claim the first national trophy in club history. The Final MVP was awarded to small forward Michael Bonaparte after he scored 21 points.

In 2016–17, Templeogue won their first league title after finishing first on the regular-season table with a 20–2 record. They went on to reach the Champions Trophy final, where they lost to Tralee Warriors.

In 2017–18, Templeogue reached the National Cup final for the second time in three years, where they defeated UCD Marian 68–62 behind 23 points from MVP Lorcan Murphy. They went on to reach their third Champions Trophy final in four years, but were once again defeated by Tralee Warriors.

In 2018–19, Templeogue were triumphant at last in the Champions Trophy tournament, defeating Belfast Star 77–62 in the final to win their first Champions Trophy title.

In 2019–20, Templeogue reached the National Cup final for the third time in five years, where they defeated Éanna 78–68 behind 33 points from MVP Lorcan Murphy.

Following the 2024–25 season, after 12 years in the Super League, Templeogue were relegated to Division One.
