= Union Carquefou-Sainte Luce Basket =

French basketball club

- Leagues: NM2
- Location: Sainte-Luce-sur-Loire, Nantes, France
- Team colors: Blue and White
- President: Jean-Claude Guibert
- Vice-president(s): Daniel Guichard
- Website: asvel.com
Home	Away

Union Carquefou-Sainte Luce Basket are a French basketball club based in the town of Sainte-Luce-sur-Loire, near Nantes in western France. The team plays in the NM2 division, which is the fourth tier of French basketball.

== Notable players ==
- James Wade (2008–2009)
