= Jason Killeen =

Irish basketball player

Limerick Sport Eagles
- Position: Centre
- League: National League Division 1

Personal information
- Born: 22 January 1985 (age 41) Limerick, Ireland
- Listed height: 210 cm (6 ft 11 in)

Career information
- High school: Notre Dame Academy (Middleburg, Virginia)
- College: Winthrop (2004–2007); Augusta (2007–2009)
- NBA draft: 2009: undrafted
- Playing career: 2009–present

Career history
- 2009–2010: Union Carquefou-Sainte Luce
- 2010: Westports KL Dragons
- 2010–2011: Cheshire Jets
- 2011–2013: UL Eagles
- 2013–2014: Beyssac Beaupuy Marmande
- 2014–2020; 2021–2022: Templeogue
- 2022–present: Limerick Sport Eagles

Career highlights
- 3× National League champion (2012, 2013, 2017); 3× National Cup champion (2012, 2016, 2018); Champions Trophy champion (2019); 2× National League Player of the Year (2012, 2019); 2× National League All-Star First Team (2018, 2019); 2× National League All-Star Second Team (2015, 2017); 2× National League All-Star Third Team (2016, 2020)

Jason Noel Killeen (born 22 January 1985) is an Irish professional basketball player. Between 2004 and 2009, Killeen played college basketball in the United States for Winthrop and Augusta State. He played 14 years with the Irish national team.

== Early life ==
Killeen was born in Limerick, Ireland.

== Professional career ==
Killeen spent his first season out of college in France, playing for Union Carquefou-Sainte Luce in 2009–10.

In October 2010, Killeen had a one-game stint with the Westports KL Dragons before joining the Cheshire Jets in early December 2010. He lasted a month with the Jets, appearing in just four games for the club.

Killeen joined his hometown team UL Eagles for the 2011–12 season and helped them win the league championship and national cup. He returned to Eagles in 2012–13 and helped the team win back-to-back titles.

In July 2013, Killeen signed with Beyssac Beaupuy Marmande for the 2013–14 season, returning to France for a second stint. He scored 329 points for the team.

In July 2014, Killeen signed with Templeogue for the 2014–15 season, returning to the Premier League for a second stint. He continued on with Templeogue in 2015–16, but missed the first half of the season due to a knee injury. On 30 January 2016, he helped Templeogue win their maiden National Cup trophy with a 78–75 win over Swords Thunder in the final.

In April 2019, Killeen was named Super League Player of the Year after leading Templeogue to the Champions Trophy title.

Killeen parted ways with Templeogue following the 2021–22 season.

Killeen is set to play for the Limerick Sport Eagles in the National League Division 1 in 2022–23.

== National team career ==
Killeen debuted for the Irish national basketball team in 2007. He helped the team win the 2021 FIBA European Championship for Small Countries. He subsequently retired from international basketball after 14 years playing or Ireland.
