= Limerick Sport Eagles =

- League: Super League
- History: Burger King Limerick; 1999–2004; Limerick Lions; 2004–2009; UL Eagles; 2009–2017; UL Sport Eagles; 2018–2020; Limerick Sport Eagles; 2021–present
- Arena: UL Sport Arena
- Location: Limerick, Ireland
- Team colors: Blue & White
- Championships: 2 (2012, 2013)

Limerick Sport Eagles is an Irish basketball team based in Limerick. The team competes in the Super League and plays its home games at the University of Limerick's Sport Arena.

== History ==
=== Early years ===
Prior to the late 1990s, Limerick's presence in the Irish National League was represented by Marathon Basketball Club. In 1999, Marathon's National League team became known as Burger King Limerick.

In 2002, Burger King Limerick celebrated their first-ever Irish Cup title after defeating Star of the Sea in the final. A year earlier, American Cleotis Brown was named Basketball Ireland Foreign Player of the Year.

In 2004, Marathon Basketball Club was renamed Limerick Lions Basketball Club, and thus, Burger King Limerick became Limerick Lions.

=== UL Eagles ===
In 2009, Limerick Lions Basketball Club parted ways with the National League team. As a result, the University of Limerick absorbed the team and rebranded it as UL Eagles.

In February 2012, UL Eagles won their first National Cup title since 2002 after defeating UCC Demons in the final. Eagles went on to win a historic National League title in March 2012, and backed that up in 2013 by defending their title. In February 2015, long-time servant of the team, Welshman Matt Hall, announced his retirement after 15 years of playing in Limerick.

After finishing last in the Super League table in 2016–17, UL Eagles were demoted to the Basketball Ireland Men's Division One National League for the 2017–18 season. However, in September 2017, the team withdrew from the National League entirely. The team returned as the UL Sport Eagles in the National League Division One in the 2018–19 season. They continued in Division One as UL Sport Eagles in the 2019–20 season.

=== Limerick Sport Eagles ===
In 2020, the team was renamed Limerick Sport Eagles. The 2020–21 Division One season did not go ahead due to the COVID-19 pandemic. The Limerick Sport Eagles continued in Division One in the 2021–22 season. In 2022–23, the team reached the Division One final.

== Achievements ==
- 2× Irish National League champions: 2012, 2013
- 2× Irish National Cup champions: 2002, 2012
