= Super League (Ireland) =

Premier men's basketball league in Ireland

Domino's Men's Super League
- Sport: Basketball
- Founded: 1973; 53 years ago
- First season: 1973–74
- No. of teams: 12
- Countries: Republic of Ireland (11 teams); Northern Ireland (1 team)
- Continent: Europe
- Most recent champion: Ballincollig (2nd title)
- Most titles: Neptune (11 titles)
- Relegation to: National League Division 1
- Website: Basketball Ireland

The Men's Super League (known as the Domino's Men's Super League for sponsorship purposes) is the top-tier men's basketball league in Ireland. The league has 13 teams (12 in the Republic of Ireland and one in Northern Ireland). The league is an active member of Basketball Ireland, which is recognised by FIBA (also known as the International Basketball Federation) as the national governing body for basketball in Ireland. Neptune holds the record for most league titles, having won the competition 11 times.

== Teams ==
Locations of Super League teams
Locations of Super League teams in Dublin

Team	Arena	City/Area
Ballincollig	MTU Arena; Parochial Hall	Cork
Belfast Star	De La Salle College; Newforge Sports Complex	Belfast
Éanna	Coláiste Éanna	Dublin
Killester	IWA Sports Hall; Oblate Hall	Dublin
Killorglin	Killorglin Sports Complex	Killorglin
Limerick Celtics	UL Arena; Crescent College	Limerick
Neptune	Neptune Stadium	Cork
Sligo All-Stars	Mercy College; Summerhill College	Sligo
St. Vincent's	St. Vincent's C.B.S.	Dublin
Tralee Warriors	MTU Tralee; Castleisland Community Centre	Tralee
UCC Demons	Mardyke Arena; Parochial Hall	Cork
UCD Marian	UCD Sports Centre; Oatlands College	Dublin

== History ==
=== Early years ===
In 1973, the Irish Basketball Association established a national basketball competition for men with two divisions. This saw many Dublin-based clubs enter their Men's A team into the top flight league, with the likes of Killester, St. Vincent's Dublin and Marian competing for supremacy against Cork-based clubs Blue Demons and Neptune. After six seasons, Kerry-born Killarney player Paudie O'Connor felt that Irish basketball was short of quality. O'Connor wanted to add glamour to the game and make it more appealing, believing showmanship and skills such as slam dunking would bring basketball to a new level in Ireland. Despite objections from the governing body and other clubs across the country, the first American players, Greg Huguley and Cornel Benford, arrived in Killarney in September 1979. Two months later, Brian Ulmer replaced Benford and St. Vincent's Killarney went on to clinch the national league title in the 1979–80 season. The addition of Americans transformed the Irish game. As a result, the league brought in regulations to limit the number of foreign-born players to two and thus prevent the full professionalisation of the league, as had happened in Britain.

=== A golden era ===
O'Connor went back to the States in 1981 and recruited Arnold Vesey and Tony Andre, the latter becoming Irish basketball's first superstar. The pair helped Killarney win their second title in three years, and their success paved the way for further American success in the top flight league. Both Cork teams, Blue Demons and Neptune, began recruiting Americans as a result of Killarney's rise, and Neptune found one of their best-ever imports – Terry Strickland. Strickland helped Neptune become the ultimate powerhouse throughout the 1980s, as they won four titles in a row between 1984–85 and 1987–88. Blue Demons and Neptune had a fierce rivalry during the 1980s – every title between 1980–81 and 1990–91 was won by one of those sides (except 1981–82). Terry Strickland of Neptune and Jasper McElroy of Blue Demons led their sides to success, but had fierce competition coming up against the likes of Kelvin Troy and Mario Elie (Killester), Dave Hopla (St. Gall's), and Deora Marsh (Ballina).

While the local Irish players were all amateurs, the American imports had to register as professionals. To afford such players, sponsors were a big part of every club. The IBA promoted a scheme whereby investors put money into clubs, and in return, the players will be walking billboards for their brand. However, there were instances when the lack of big sponsors and talent led to clubs struggling to keep up with the increased competition. Marian were champions in 1978, but the new semi-professional era of the league saw them get left behind, and following the 1982–83 season, the team was relegated from the top flight league. They had a very successful campaign in Division 2 in 1983–84, finishing a close second behind Liam McHale's Ballina, and earned promotion back to the top flight. However, following the 1985–86 season, Marian were relegated for a second time, returning again for the 1987–88 season.

In 1986 and 1987, plans were implemented to reduce the number of imports a team can have. 80% of the clubs agreed that the number should be reduced from two to one, and with the support of the IBA, the ruling came into play for the 1988–89 season. There was a very negative reaction to the change in Cork, as they felt they were being unjustly treated and punished for being successful. The two main arguments made for the change was to give local Irish players more opportunities and to cut costs, with it becoming too expensive to pay two imports for some clubs. As a result of the change, the hype of Irish basketball began to wear down and the public became disinterested in the sport throughout the 1990s.

=== Post-halcyon ===
Neptune continued to be the dominant team throughout the 1990s and early 2000s. Belfast's Star of the Sea began to challenge them in the late 1990s as they collected three National Championships between 1996 and 1998, and won two league titles in 1998 and 1999.

In 1998, the league's long association with sponsor Budweiser came to an end, and thus ESB became the new sponsor. In addition, a new format was introduced for the 1998–99 season. A relaunch of the league was inevitable with the change of sponsor but the IBA also took the opportunity to devise yet another new format, which resulted in the expansion of the Superleague to 14 teams – effectively, an amalgamation of the two men's national league divisions from 1997–98.

Due to the 2001 foot-and-mouth outbreak, the 2000–01 season was abandoned in March 2001. The 2001 title was originally not awarded to any team, despite the fact that Killester were leaders at the time of abandonment. The National Championships, due to be held on 24/25 March, were also abandoned. The following month, an IBA panel declared that Killester were the winners for 2001.

In 2003, North and South Conferences were introduced into the league. As a result, the league champion would be determined by the team who made it through to and won the grand final. Prior to 2003–04, the league title was awarded to the team who finished on top of the ladder and the runner-up was who finished second on the ladder; a post-season tournament was then held to determine a National Champion. Past National Champions include St. Vincent's (1995, 1999 and 2003), Star of the Sea (1996–98), Notre Dame (2000) and Tralee Tigers (2002). In 2012–13, the league reverted to the old model and removed conferences, re-establishing league champions as the top of the ladder finishers, and established a Champions Trophy tournament for the final two weeks of the season.

=== New era ===
In 2013, Basketball Ireland rebranded the competition and changed the name from SuperLeague to Premier League. Over the next three seasons, UCC Demons won seven of the nine trophies, including going unbeaten in the 2014–15 season.

In 2015, Basketball Ireland's representative team Hibernia played in the FIBA Europe Cup. The team's roster was filled with Premier League players.

In 2016, Basketball Ireland renamed the competition "Super League" for the 2016–17 season.

== Roll of honour ==
Season	League winner	National Cup winner
1973–74	Blue Demons	Not yet established
1974–75	Killester	Not yet established
1975–76	Killester	Not yet established
1976–77	Killester	Not yet established
1977–78	Marian	Not yet established
1978–79	St. Vincent's Dublin	Not yet established
1979–80	St. Vincent's Killarney	Not yet established
1980–81	Blue Demons	Not yet established
1981–82	Killarney	Not yet established
1982–83	Neptune	Not yet established
1983–84	Blue Demons	St. Vincent's Dublin
1984–85	Neptune	Neptune
1985–86	Neptune	Blue Demons
1986–87	Neptune	Killester
1987–88	Neptune	Neptune
1988–89	Blue Demons	Corinthians
1989–90	Neptune	Neptune
1990–91	Neptune	Ballina
1991–92	Ballina	Neptune
1992–93	North Monastery	St. Vincent's Dublin
1993–94	St. Vincent's Dublin	St. Vincent's Dublin
1994–95	Neptune	North Monastery
1995–96	Tralee Tigers	Ballina
1996–97	Neptune	Notre Dame
1997–98	Star of the Sea	Notre Dame
1998–99	Star of the Sea	Notre Dame
1999–2000	Neptune	Notre Dame
2000–01	Killester	Killester
2001–02	Waterford Crystal	Limerick
2002–03	Neptune	UCC Demons
2003–04	Tralee Tigers	UCC Demons
2004–05	UCC Demons	Tralee Tigers
2005–06	St. Vincent's Dublin	UCC Demons
2006–07	Killester	Tralee Tigers
2007–08	Tralee Tigers	Killester
2008–09	UCC Demons	UCC Demons
2009–10	Killester	Killester
2010–11	Killester	UCD Marian
2011–12	UL Eagles	UL Eagles
2012–13	UL Eagles	Neptune
2013–14	Killester	UCC Demons
2014–15	UCC Demons	UCC Demons
2015–16	UCC Demons	Templeogue
2016–17	Templeogue	Swords Thunder
2017–18	UCD Marian	Templeogue
2018–19	Tralee Warriors	Killester
2019–20	Belfast Star	Templeogue
2020–21	Season cancelled due to COVID-19 pandemic	
2021–22	Tralee Warriors	Tralee Warriors
2022–23	Ballincollig	Maree
2023–24	Éanna	UCC Demons
2024–25	UCC Demons	Killester
2025–26	Ballincollig	Ballincollig

Champions Trophy
Season	Winner	Runner-up
2012–13	UCC Demons	DCU Saints
2013–14	UCC Demons	Killester
2014–15	UCC Demons	Templeogue
2015–16	UCC Demons	Killester
2016–17	Tralee Warriors	Templeogue
2017–18	Tralee Warriors	Templeogue
2018–19	Templeogue	Belfast Star
2019–20	Cancelled due to COVID-19 pandemic	

Team	League titles	Winning years
Neptune	11	1983, 1985, 1986, 1987, 1988, 1990, 1991, 1995, 1997, 2000, 2003
UCC Demons	9	1974, 1981, 1984, 1989, 2005, 2009, 2015, 2016, 2025
Killester	8	1975, 1976, 1977, 2001, 2007, 2010, 2011, 2014
DCU Saints	3	1979, 1994, 2006
Tralee Tigers	3	1996, 2004, 2008
Belfast Star	3	1998, 1999, 2020
UCD Marian	2	1978, 2018
Killarney	2	1980, 1982
UL Eagles	2	2012, 2013
Tralee Warriors	2	2019, 2022
Ballincollig	2	2023, 2026
Ballina	1	1992
North Monastery	1	1993
Waterford Crystal	1	2002
Templeogue	1	2017
Éanna	1	2024

Team	National Cup titles	Winning years
UCC Demons	8	1986, 2003, 2004, 2006, 2009, 2014, 2015, 2024
Killester	6	1987, 2001, 2008, 2010, 2019, 2025
Neptune	5	1985, 1988, 1990, 1992, 2013
Notre Dame	4	1997, 1998, 1999, 2000
DCU Saints	3	1984, 1993, 1994
Templeogue	3	2016, 2018, 2020
Ballina	2	1991, 1996
UL Eagles	2	2002, 2012
Tralee Tigers	2	2005, 2007
Corinthian	1	1989
North Monastery	1	1995
UCD Marian	1	2011
Swords Thunder	1	2017
Tralee Warriors	1	2022
Maree	1	2023
Ballincollig	1	2026

Team	Champions Trophy titles	Winning years
UCC Demons	4	2013, 2014, 2015, 2016
Tralee Warriors	2	2017, 2018
Templeogue	1	2019

Source: Basketball Ireland
