= UCC Demons =

- Leagues: Super League
- History: Super League: Blue Demons; 1973–1993, 1998–2002; UCC Demons; 2002–2019; 2022–
- Arena: Mardyke Arena, UCC
- Location: Cork, Ireland
- Team colors: Blue, white, red
- Championships: 9 (1974, 1981, 1984, 1989, 2005, 2009, 2015, 2016, 2025)
- Website: BlueDemonsBC.com

UCC Demons are an Irish basketball team based in Cork. The team competes in the Super League and plays its home games at Mardyke Arena. The team is a division of Blue Demons Basketball Club and is directly associated with the University College Cork.

== History ==
=== Early years ===
In 1959, a youth club known as De Paul Boys Club was established in Sunday's Well, Cork as a means for boys to play indoor sports between September and April. In 1966, a men's team entered the senior ranks of Cork Basketball. The team was built off the basis of De Paul, with most of the players in the inaugural team having come through the juvenile level with De Paul. Thus, Blue Demons Basketball Club was established. The name "Blue Demons" was the preferred choice as it was the nickname of the DePaul University college basketball team in Chicago, who were very generous in their support of the fledgling De Paul Boys Club. The year 1968 was a significant year for Blue Demons with participation in the first National Club Competition. The National Club Competition was the forerunner of the National League, which began in 1973.

=== National League titles ===
Blue Demons were the inaugural winners of the National League in 1973–74. With their early success, they were able to organise one of the first significant international tournaments in Ireland. The Major Extra Size International Basketball Tournament attracted teams from England, Scotland, France, Belgium, Yugoslavia, Iceland and Canada. The tournament was held in the Parochial Hall in Cork and exposed the local teams and fans to the next level of basketball. By the early 1980s, the recruitment of American imports saw the league expand and grow in popularity. Basketball in Cork was huge as a result, with arch rivals Neptune and Blue Demons fighting out for supremacy throughout the 1980s. Behind the likes of Jasper McElroy and Anthony Jenkins, Blue Demons won three National League titles between 1981 and 1989.

=== Five-year National League hiatus ===
A form slump between 1989–90 and 1992–93 saw Blue Demons withdraw from the top flight National League in 1993. It was determined by then Club Chairman Barry Deasy that continuing their participation at senior national level would jeopardise the future of the club and make it impossible to maintain their juvenile and junior structure. In 1997, the club entered an intermediate squad in the Sprite National Cup to test their strength and standards in the hope of re-entering the National League in 1998. Behind Americans Lafelle McGilvery (27ppg) and John Owens (29ppg), as well as Shane Coughlan, Shane McCarthy and Noel Browne (vital members of Blue Demons' 1996 U19 Cup title), the team had victories over Limerick and St Gall's before meeting their match against Cup holders Denny Notre Dame. Their successful five-year focus on junior basketball saw Blue Demons win the 1998 Club of the Year award courtesy of the Irish Basketball Association.

=== Return to action ===
In 1998, Blue Demons Basketball Club re-entered a team into the National League. In 2002, the club teamed up with the University College Cork, and as a result, the National League team became known as "UCC Demons". Three years later, Demons won their first title since 1989. In 2009, Demons claimed their sixth National League title and fifth National Cup title.

=== O'Reilly-Colbert era ===
The 2012–13 season saw Demons begin a dominant legacy in the National League, as they won the inaugural Champions Trophy title. The following season saw them acquire the services of Irish international Colin O'Reilly, who joined as player/coach, and American import Lehmon Colbert. The pair guided Demons to their sixth National Cup title and a second consecutive Champions Trophy title.

In 2014–15, UCC Demons created history in Irish basketball by becoming the first side ever to remain undefeated for an entire season. They claimed the end-of-season Champions Trophy to add to their League and Cup titles in a campaign that saw them win 24 games in a row. For the season, O'Reilly was named both Player and Coach of the Year.

In 2015–16, Demons won their eighth league title and their fourth consecutive Champions Trophy crown. For the season, Colbert was named Player of the Year.

Both O'Reilly and Colbert left UCC Demons in 2016, and as a result, the team finished in sixth place in 2016–17. The pair returned to the team for the 2017–18 season.

In June 2019, following the exodus of a number of players, UCC Demons withdrew from the Super League after they were unable to secure enough talent for the 2019–20 season.

=== Return to Super League ===
In June 2021, UCC Demons were revived and joined the National League Division One for the 2021–22 season. They won the 2022 President's Cup and the 2022 Division One championship. They were subsequently promoted back into the Super League for the 2022–23 season. In 2024, the team won their eighth National Cup.

In the 2024–25 season, UCC Demons won the Super League championship with a 94–92 win over Killester in the final.

== Achievements ==
- 9× Irish National League champions: 1974, 1981, 1984, 1989, 2005, 2009, 2015, 2016, 2025
- 8× Irish National Cup champions: 1986, 2003, 2004, 2006, 2009, 2014, 2015, 2024
- 4× Irish Champions Trophy champions: 2013, 2014, 2015, 2016

== Notable past players ==
- (United States) Lehmon Colbert
- (Australia) / (Republic of Ireland) Damian Matacz
- (Republic of Ireland) Colin O'Reilly
- (United States) M. J. Randolph
- (United States) Seventh Woods
