= UCD Marian =

- Leagues: Super League
- Arena: UCD Sports Centre
- Location: Belfield, Dublin, Ireland
- Team colors: Yellow & blue
- Championships: 2 (1978, 2018)
- Website: UCDMarian.com

UCD Marian is an Irish basketball team based in Dublin that competes in the Super League. The team is a division of UCD Marian Basketball Club and is directly associated with the University College Dublin.

== History ==
=== Early years ===
Marian Basketball Club was founded in 1968 when a group of pupils and past-pupils of Marian College, Ballsbridge entered a team in the Dublin Minor Basketball League. That team included Paul Meany, Ken McIntyre, Sean Conroy, Michael Meany and Fran Ryan. The team won the Dublin Minor Championship, and two years later, the club also entered a team in the Dublin Senior League. This team absorbed an existing team called the Shannon Dodgers, which featured Dublin-based past pupils of St. Marys College, Athlone, another Marist Brothers school. These included Bill Doyle and Lonan McHugo. In 1970, the club won the Dublin Senior Championship with Paul Meany, Ken McIntyre, Sean Conroy, Michael Meany and Fran Ryan all featuring.

In 1972, New York native Brian Berman, who was studying medicine at the College of Surgeons, and had played college basketball at Columbia University, joined the team. Under player-coach Paul Meany, Marian won their first national title, the National Cup.

=== National League ===
In 1973–74, Marian entered the inaugural National League with the Men's A team in Division One and the Men's B team in Division Two. After finishing runners-up behind Killester for three straight years between 1975 and 1977, Marian were crowned champions of the National League in 1978 after defeating St. Vincent's Dublin in the final. 1978 also saw Marian compete in the Federation Cup for British and Irish teams.

The 1979–80 season marked a sea change in Irish basketball as it was the first time paid players were recruited from overseas. St Vincent's Killarney brought over two American players and re-shaped the top flight league. The league brought in regulations to limit the number of foreign born players to two and thus prevent the full professionalisation of the league as had happened in Britain.

For the 1981–82 season, Canadian coach Bruce Patterson took the reins, while Irish international John O'Connor joined from Killester. Tom Hinga, a 6'5" forward from Colorado, became the first paid player for Marian. A mid-table finish in 1982 meant the club had to seriously raise sponsorship and finance to compete in the new semi-professional era. The Irish Basketball Association (IBA) promoted a scheme whereby American investors put money into clubs, including Marian. George Murphy from Chicago was the principal investor in the club. The club also acquired sponsorship from Yoplait, and as a result, the National League team was called Team Yoplait for the next four seasons (1982–86). Unfortunately, results on court were not so good and the team was relegated from the top flight at the end of the 1982–83 season.

Team Yoplait had a very successful campaign in Division Two in 1983–84, finishing a close second behind Liam McHale's Ballina, and winning promotion back to the top flight. With renewed vigour and healthy funding, the club faced into the 1984–85 season with confidence. Fran Ryan took over as coach, while guard Dan Trant and forward Alvis Rogers were brought in. The season came to a disappointing end with Team Yoplait just missing out on a top four place. More significantly, the club had run up a significant debt and a serious rethink of the viability of the National League team was undertaken in 1985.

As a result of a club-structural rethink, the men's national league team was separated from the club, financially and management wise. For the 1985–86 season, Mike Smith and William Milteer were recruited, and Yoplait were retained as sponsors. In January 1986, Team Yoplait reached the semi-finals of the National Cup. There they faced the league-leading Neptune, but were defeated. The team's league form continued to disappoint, as they battled with Ballina and Sporting Belfast for two relegation spots. A bottom-two finish saw Marian relegated for the second time in four seasons.

For the 1986–87 season, Paul Meany came back as coach and Fran Ryan returned as point guard. At Christmas, three players left the squad and seven defeats left Marian struggling to make the Division Two top four playoffs. They were promoted back to the top flight league for the 1987–88 season.

In January 2011, UCD Marian claimed a historic National Cup final win over defending cup champions Killester. The win was the team's first major victory since 1978. Marian made it back to the National Cup final in 2015, where they lost to UCC Demons. In January 2018, UCD Marian returned to the National Cup final, where they were defeated 68–62 by Templeogue. Two months later, they ended a 40-year championship drought as they were crowned Basketball Ireland Men's Super League champions for 2017–18.

Following the 2022–23 season, UCD Marian were relegated to the National League Division One. After winning the 2023–24 Division One, the team was promoted back to the Super League for the 2024–25 season.

== Notable past players ==
- (United States) / (Republic of Ireland) Jermaine Turner
