= Neptune Basketball Club =

- Founded: 1947
- Arena: Neptune Stadium
- Location: Cork, Ireland
- Team colours: Blue and white
- Main sponsor: Energywise Ireland
- Head coach: Ciarán Kiveney (as of 2025)

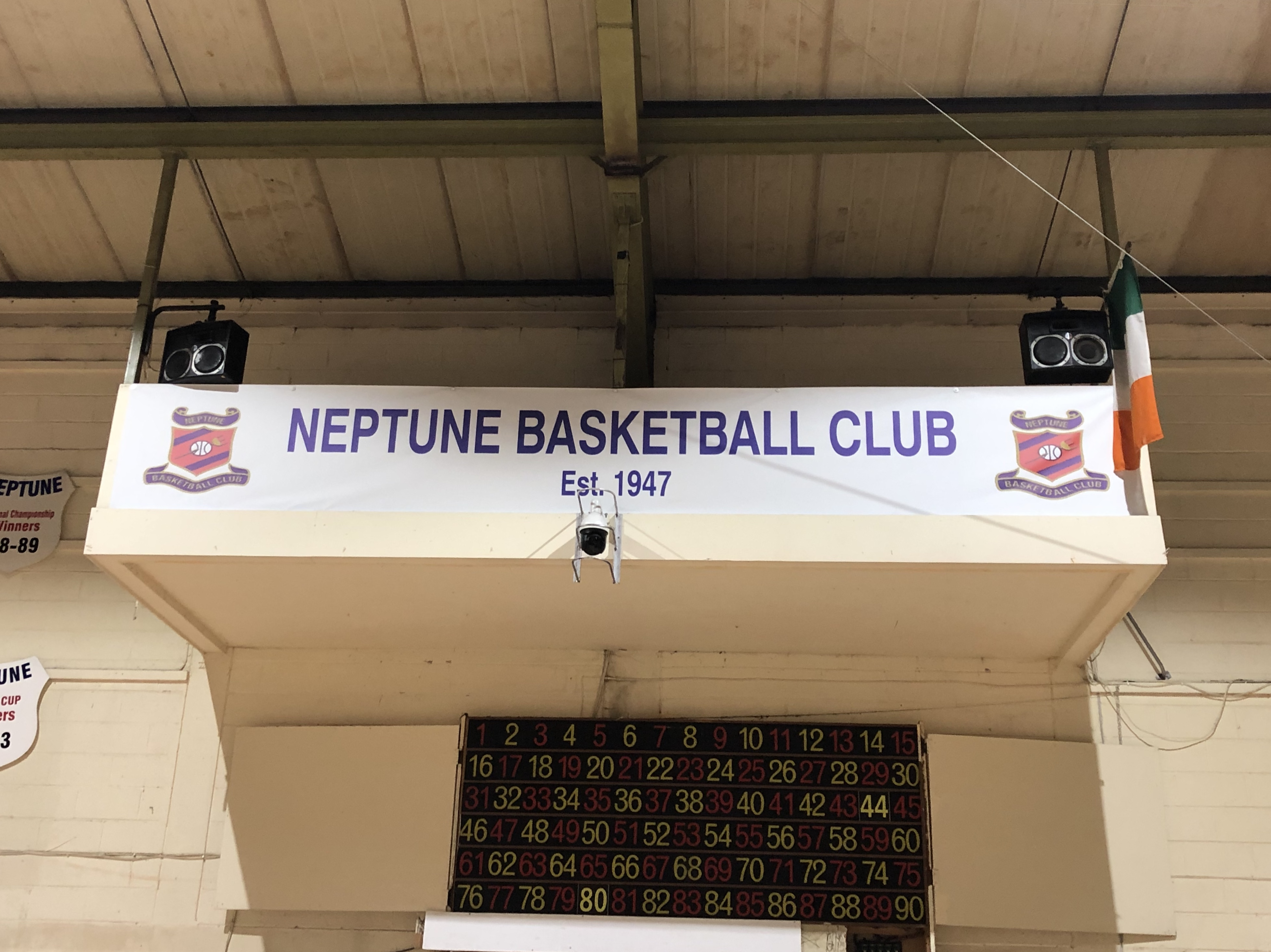
Banner at Neptune Stadium

Neptune Basketball Club is an Irish basketball club based in Cork. Founded in 1947 following input from members of the Irish Defence Forces in developing citizen's clubs, Neptune is the oldest and most successful basketball club in Ireland. Based at Neptune Stadium, Neptune is the only basketball club in Ireland with its own stadium.

== History ==
The club's senior men's representative team has won the Irish National League title 11 times. Known as Burgerland Neptune throughout the 1980s and 1990s, the team won seven championships between 1983 and 1991 thanks to American import Terry Strickland and the support of Irish investor Jackie Solan. Neptune won a further four titles between 1995 and 2003. In the 2012–13 season, Neptune won their fifth National Cup title and first since 1992.

In July 2015, Neptune withdrew from the Premier League following a major loss of player personnel, deciding instead to join the second-tiered National League Division 1 for the 2015–16 season. Neptune continued on in Division 1 for the 2016–17 season and subsequently won the 2017 Hula Hoops Presidents Cup. In March 2018, they were promoted back into Basketball Ireland's Men's Super League. After initially being relegated back down to Division 1 following the 2018–19 season, the withdrawal of cross-town rival UCC Demons led to Neptune remaining in the Super League for the 2019–20 season.

In the 2021–22 season, Neptune reached the final of both the National Cup and the League playoffs.

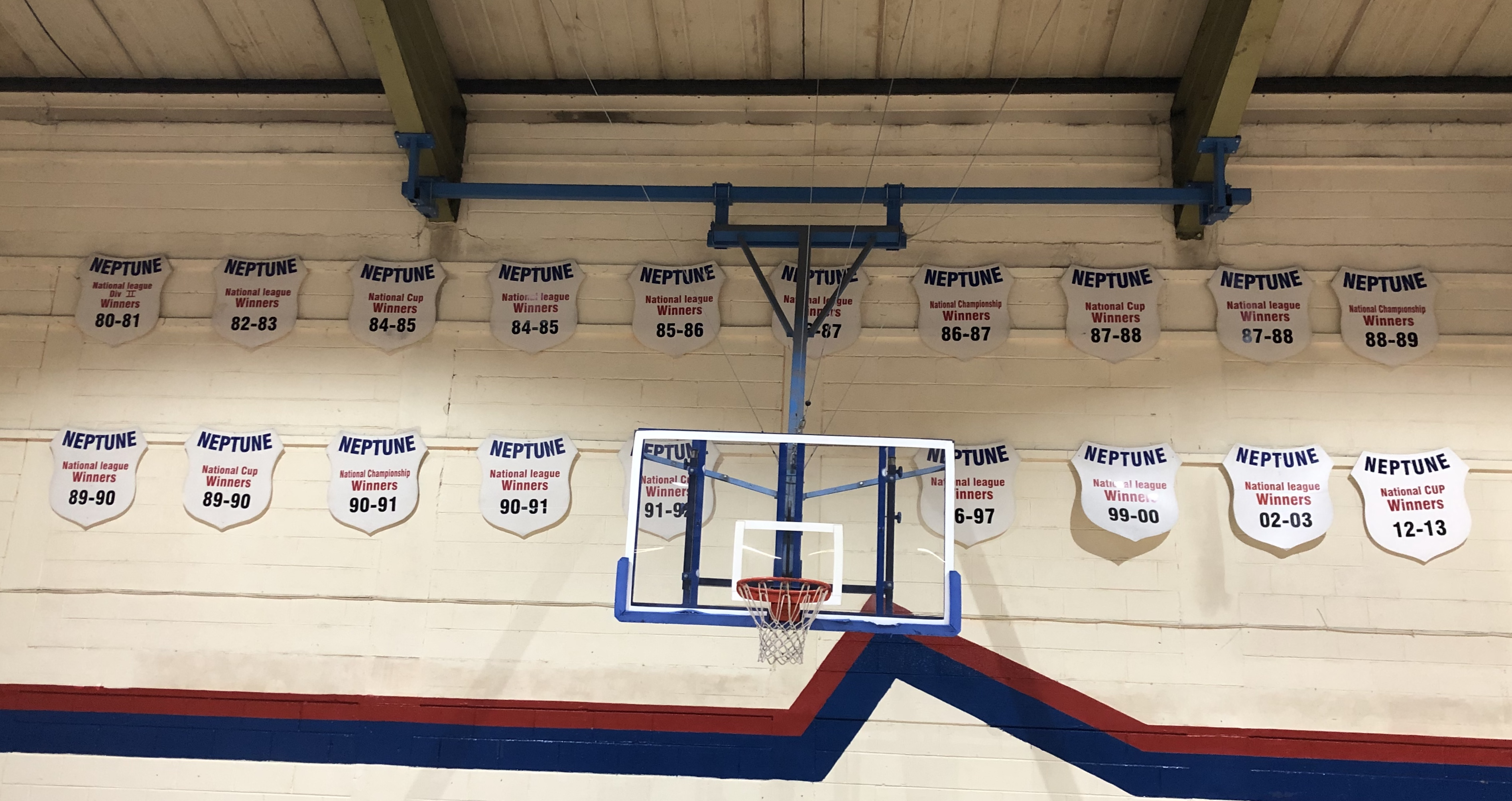
Neptune's championship banners

== Achievements ==
- 11× Irish Men's National League champions: 1983, 1985, 1986, 1987, 1988, 1990, 1991, 1995, 1997, 2000, 2003
- 5× Irish Men's National Cup champions: 1985, 1988, 1990, 1992, 2013

== Notable players ==
- (United States) Lehmon Colbert
- (United States) Pete Strickland
