= Belfast Star =

Basketball team in Belfast, Northern Ireland

- Leagues: Super League
- History: Super League; 1983–2012, 2013–present
- Arena: Newforge Sports Complex; De La Salle College
- Location: Belfast, Northern Ireland
- Team colors: Blue & white
- Championships: 3 (1998, 1999, 2020)

Belfast Star is a basketball team based in Belfast, Northern Ireland. The team competes in the Super League and plays its home games at Newforge Sports Complex and De La Salle College. It is the only team in the Super League based in Northern Ireland.

== History ==
In 1964, Dr. Liam Conlon founded Star of the Sea Youth Club. Primarily a football club, Conlon wanted to encourage participation in other sports, so future Star president Bill McCotter became involved at the forefront of basketball development at the club. By the late 1960s/early 1970s, a Star of the Sea men's basketball team was playing in the Ulster League. In 1982–83, Dave Shehadi – an American from Bucknell University – became player-coach and this boost for the club resulted in the team entering the All-Ireland League in 1983–84 with John Copeland, a 6'9” Californian who played at UNLV, as the professional.

Star's best known American was Javan Dupree, who arrived in 1985 and played for the next 15 years before retiring. He was a vital part of the team's dominance in the late 1990s. In 1996, Star won their first of three consecutive National Championships. They also won back-to-back All-Ireland League titles in 1998 and 1999.

The team was known as Sx3 Star (2001–03) and MDS Star (2003–06) throughout the early 2000s. In 2007, Star of the Sea Basketball Club changed their name to Belfast Star Basketball Club. Prior to the 2012–13 season, Belfast Star withdrew from the Irish National League. They were able to re-enter the league for the 2013–14 season.

In March 2020, Belfast Star were declared the champions of the 2019–20 Super League season, thus winning their first league title since 1999.

On 12 March 2022, Belfast Star withdrew from the 2021–22 Super League season after having played an American-based player who was incorrectly registered at the start of the season.

== Achievements ==
- 3 Irish National League titles: 1998, 1999, 2020
- 3 Irish National Championships: 1996, 1997, 1998
