= Killester Basketball Club =

Local sports club in Dublin, Ireland

- Founded: 1967
- Arena: IWA Sports Hall
- Location: Clontarf, Dublin, Ireland
- Team colors: Orange & black
- Website: killester.com
Home	Away

Killester Basketball Club is an Irish basketball club based in Dublin. The club's senior men's team play in the Super League and play its home games at IWA Sports Hall in Clontarf.

== History ==
The club was established in 1967 by Michael Casey.

In 1973, Killester was an inaugural team in the Irish National League. Between 1975 and 1977, the team won three championships in a row. Between 2001 and 2014, they won five championships and three National Cup titles.

In the 2024–25 season, Killester won the National Cup for the first time since 2019. They went on to reach the 2024–25 Super League final, where they lost to UCC Demons.

== Notable past players ==
- (United States) Mario Elie
- (United States) / (Republic of Ireland) Jermaine Turner

== Women's team ==
In 1978, Killester entered the inaugural season of the women's competition, going on to win the 1978–79 and 1979–80 women's league championships. In 2002 and 2005, the women's team won National Cup titles. In 2023–24 and 2024–25, the women's team won back-to-back league championships.
