= St. Vincent's Basketball Club =

Basketball team in Dublin, Ireland

- Leagues: Super League
- Founded: 1973; 53 years ago as St. Vincent's
- History: St. Vincent's; 1973–2007; 2022– DCU Saints; 2007–2022
- Arena: St. Vincent's C.B.S.
- Location: Dublin, Ireland
- Team colours: Blue & yellow
- Championships: 3 (1979, 1994, 2006)
Home	Away

St. Vincent's Basketball Club is an Irish basketball club based in Dublin. The club's senior men's team competes in the Super League.

== History ==
Basketball was first introduced in a school yard of St. Vincent's C.B.S. by Brother O'Farrell in 1958. The sport took off in 1961, and in September 1962, St. Vincent's Basketball Club registered with the ABBA. The Irish National League was created in 1973, with St. Vincent's winning their first league title in 1979. The team won two more league titles in 1993–94 and 2005–06. The team also won National Cup titles in 1984, 1993 and 1994. In 1999, the team won their fifth National Championship.

For the 2000–01 season, the team was known as O'Hagan Saints. For the 2002–03 season, the team was known as Irish Travel Partner Saints. Then between 2004 and 2006, the team donned they name of Roma St. Vincent's. The team became known as DCU Saints for the 2007–08 season after moving out of the gymnasium of St. Vincent's C.B.S. and into the Dublin City University Sports Complex. The team returned to St. Vincent's C.B.S. for the 2022–23 season.

== Achievements ==
- 3× Irish National League champions: 1979, 1994, 2006
- 3× Irish National Cup champions: 1984, 1993, 1994
