= Irish Wheelchair Association =

Disability charity

The Irish Wheelchair Association (IWA) is a charity in Ireland that works with people with physical disabilities. Founded in 1960. by 2016 it reportedly had approximately 2,000 registered volunteers across its 32 volunteer branches. The IWA's objectives are to advocate for the rights of people with physical disabilities by influencing public policy, the provision of different services, and support to its members.

The first chairman of the Irish Wheelchair Association was Fr. Leo Close CM, a paraplegic athlete and wheelchair user.

The IWA provided resource and outreach services to 2,064 people in 57 locations in 2016.
