= Basketball Ireland =

Governing body for basketball on the island of Ireland

- Sport: Basketball
- Jurisdiction: Ireland; Northern Ireland
- Abbreviation: BI
- Founded: 1945
- Affiliation: FIBA
- Headquarters: National Basketball Arena, Dublin
- President: Margaret Miley
- Chairman: Seamas Donnelly
- CEO: John Feehan

Official website
- ireland.basketball

Basketball Ireland (BI; Irish: Cispheil Éireann) is the national governing body for the sport on the island of Ireland. Part of FIBA Europe, the European governing body, and of FIBA, the World governing body, BI is responsible for the promotion and administration of basketball throughout Ireland and for Irish international participation. The organisation was founded in 1945 as the Amateur Basketball Association of Ireland (ABAI). The name of the organisation changed from the original ABAI to the Irish Basketball Association (IBA) in 1980.

BI operates as a conduit with Government Departments, particularly the Department of Transport, Arts, Tourism & Sport who have significantly funded BI in the past. BI is also the main conduit for the Irish Sports Council who provide significant funding.

BI positions itself as a service centre for all levels of the game, facilitating all aspects of promoting and running the sport. At national level, BI acts under the direction of the Board of Basketball Ireland whose remit includes financial governance and business strategy formation. BI also supports the National Council, the body on which every facet of the sport is represented, which acts as the sport policy formation and activation centre of the sport. BI seeks to promote the game, in all its forms, to supporters and prospective supporters by emphasising the great attributes of basketball.

== Competitions ==
National Leagues

Level	Men	Women
1	Super League; 12 teams	Super League; 9 teams
2	Division 1; 12 teams	Division 1; 8 teams

Cups

Men	Women
National	National
Senior National	Senior National
Intermediate Club Championship	Intermediate Club Championship
U20 National	U20 National
U18 National	U18 National
U18 Shield	U18 Shield

Other

- Schools League and Cup
- All-Ireland Club Championships (U14/U16 Boys and Girls)
- National Area Intermediate Competition
- College
- Wheelchair

== Senior national teams ==
In February 2010, Basketball Ireland deactivated both the senior men's and women's national teams due to a financial crisis within the organisation. The full effect of the financial crisis was a debt of €1.2m, which made the continued funding of the national program too much of a financial burden. In June 2014, it was announced that Basketball Ireland were readmitting the senior national teams to international play in 2015.

== See also ==
- Ireland men's national basketball team
- Ireland women's national basketball team
- Super League
