= List of schools in County Dublin =

This is a partial list of schools in County Dublin, listed by local authority. It includes currently operating primary and secondary schools that link to an internal Wikipedia article.

== Dublin ==
=== Primary schools ===
- Kildare Place National School, Rathmines
- St. Declan's School, Ballsbridge

=== Primary/Secondary schools ===
- St. Mary's College, Rathmines
- Sutton Park School, Sutton

=== Secondary schools ===
- Alexandra College, Milltown
- Ardscoil La Salle, Raheny
- Ardscoil Rís, Marino
- Belvedere College, Dublin 1
- Catholic University School, Dublin 2
- Chanel College, Coolock
- Coláiste Mhuire, Cabra
- Drimnagh Castle Secondary School, Drimnagh
- Gaelcholáiste Reachrann, Donaghmede
- Gonzaga College, Ranelagh
- The High School, Rathgar
- Holy Faith Secondary School, Clontarf
- Institute of Education, Dublin 2
- Kylemore College, Ballyfermot
- Loreto College, St Stephen's Green
- Manor House School, Raheny
- Marian College, Ballsbridge
- Mercy College, Coolock
- Mount Temple Comprehensive School, Clontarf
- Muckross Park College, Donnybrook
- O'Connell School, Dublin 1
- Ringsend Technical Institute, Ringsend
- St Aidan's C.B.S., Dublin 9
- St Conleth's College, Ballsbridge
- St Declan's College, Cabra West
- St. Joseph's C.B.S., Fairview
- St. Kevin's College, Glasnevin
- St Louis High School, Rathmines
- St Paul's College, Raheny
- St. Vincent's C.B.S., Glasnevin
- Sandford Park School, Ranelagh
- Stratford College, Rathgar
- Synge Street CBS, Dublin 8
- Terenure College, Terenure

== Dún Laoghaire–Rathdown ==
=== Primary schools ===
- Dalkey School Project, Glenageary
- Willow Park School

=== Primary/Secondary schools ===
- Lycée Français International Samuel Beckett, Clonskeagh/Foxrock
- John Scottus School, Rathmichael
- Nord Anglia International School Dublin, Leopardstown
- Rathdown School, Glenageary
- St Kilian's German School, Clonskeagh
- St. Raphaela's School, Stillorgan

=== Secondary schools ===
- Blackrock College, Williamstown
- Christian Brothers College, Monkstown Park
- Clonkeen College, Deansgrange
- Coláiste Eoin, Booterstown
- Coláiste Íosagáin, Booterstown
- De La Salle College Churchtown
- Dominican College Sion Hill, Blackrock
- Holy Child Killiney
- Loreto Abbey, Dalkey
- Loreto College, Foxrock
- Mount Anville Secondary School, Goalstown
- Newpark Comprehensive School, Blackrock
- Oatlands College, Mount Merrion
- St. Andrew's College, Booterstown
- St Benildus College, Stillorgan
- Wesley College, Ballinteer

== Fingal ==
=== Primary schools ===
- St Brigid's National School, Castleknock

=== Secondary schools ===
- Castleknock College, Castleknock
- Castleknock Community College, Castleknock
- Coolmine Community School, Coolmine
- Hartstown Community School, Hartstown
- Loreto College, Swords
- Malahide Community School, Malahide
- Maryfield College, Whitehall
- Pobalscoil Neasáin, Baldoyle
- Portmarnock Community School, Portmarnock
- St. Fintan's High School, Sutton
- St. Joseph's Secondary School, Rush

== South Dublin ==
=== Primary/Secondary Schools ===
- St. Michael's College, Dublin 4

=== Secondary schools ===
- Ashfield College, Dundrum
- Coláiste Bríde, Clondalkin
- Coláiste Cois Life, Lucan
- Coláiste Éanna, Ballyroan
- Coláiste Phádraig, Lucan
- Greenhills College, Greenhills
- The King's Hospital, Palmerstown
- Loreto High School Beaufort, Rathfarnham
- Moyle Park College, Clondalkin
- Pobalscoil Iosolde, Palmerstown
- Rockbrook Park School, Rathfarnham
- Sancta Maria College, Rathfarnham
- St. Columba's College, Whitechurch
- St Mac Dara's Community College, Templeogue
- Templeogue College, Templeogue

== See also ==
- List of schools in the Republic of Ireland
