= List of fee-charging schools in Ireland =

This is a list of private fee-charging schools in Ireland.

== Primary schools (some with pre-school also) ==
=== Leinster ===
- Headfort School, Kells, County Meath

==== Dublin ====
- The Childrens House Primary Montessori School, Stillorgan
- Alexandra College, Milltown (co-located with secondary)
- John Scottus School, Old Conna, Rathmichael (co-located with secondary)
- Loreto College (Junior School), St Stephen's Green (co-located with secondary)
- Lycée Francais d'Irlande, Foxrock
- Mount Anville Junior Montessori School, Stillorgan (co-located with secondary)
- Nord Anglia International School Dublin, Leopardstown (co-located with secondary)
- Rathdown School, Glenageary (co-located with secondary)
- Rathgar Junior School, Rathmines
- St Kilian's German School, Clonskeagh (co-located with secondary)
- Sutton Park School, Sutton (co-located with secondary)
- Willow Park School, Blackrock (co-located with Blackrock College)
- C.B.C. Monkstown Park, Dún Laoghaire

=== Munster ===
- Scoil Mhuire, Cork
- Christian Brothers College, Cork
- Hewitt College, Cork

== Secondary schools ==
In 2016, there were 51 fee-charging private second level schools in Ireland, which as of the academic year 2014/15, had 24,112 students enrolled. The distribution of the schools across the country was very uneven, with only one each in two provinces, and around 75% located in Dublin.

Annual day fees are typically between €4,000 to €7,000; however the cost of boarding can increase these fees significantly, up to more than €15,000 for the school year. In 2012, fee-charging schools in Ireland took in €121 million in fees out of a total revenue of €227 million.

=== Connacht ===
- Sligo Grammar School

=== Leinster ===
- Cistercian College, Roscrea
- Clongowes Wood College
- Drogheda Grammar School
- Dundalk Grammar School
- Leinster Senior College
- Newbridge College
- Wilson's Hospital School
- Kilkenny College

==== Dublin ====
- Alexandra College
- Ashfield College (Note: 5th and 6th year only)
- Belvedere College
- Blackrock College
- Castleknock College
- Catholic University School
- C.B.C. Monkstown
- The Dublin Academy of Education
- Gonzaga College
- The High School, Dublin
- Holy Child Killiney
- Institute of Education, Dublin (Note: 4th, 5th and 6th year only)
- John Scottus School
- The King's Hospital
- Loreto Abbey, Dalkey
- Loreto College, Foxrock
- Loreto College, St Stephen's Green
- Loreto High School Beaufort
- Lycée Français d'Irlande, Clonskeagh
- Mount Anville Secondary School
- Nord Anglia International School Dublin
- Mount Sackville Secondary School
- Rathdown School
- Rockbrook Park School
- Rosemont Secondary School
- St Andrew's College
- St Columba's College
- St Conleth's College
- St Gerard's School
- St Joseph of Cluny Secondary School
- St Kilian's German School
- St Mary's College
- St Michael's College
- Sandford Park School
- SEK International School Dublin
- Sutton Park School
- Terenure College
- The Teresian School
- Wesley College

=== Munster ===
- Bandon Grammar School
- Christian Brothers College, Cork
- Glenstal Abbey School
- Limerick Tutorial College
- Midleton College
- Newtown School, Waterford
- Presentation Brothers College, Cork
- Rockwell College
- Villiers School
- Scoil Mhuire, Cork
- Hewitt College, Cork

=== Ulster ===
- Monaghan Collegiate School

== See also ==
- Education in the Republic of Ireland
- List of schools in the Republic of Ireland
