= 2020–21 Irish Super League season =

- League: Super League
- Sport: Basketball
- Duration: Season that was scheduled: 17 October 2020 – 6 March 2021
- Teams: 12

Regular season

Super League seasons
- ← 2019–20 2021–22 →

The 2020–21 Irish Super League season was to be the 48th running of Basketball Ireland's premier men's basketball competition. The season was set to feature 12 teams from across the Republic of Ireland and Northern Ireland. In July 2020, it was announced that just for the 2020–21 season, teams would compete in a conference system. The season was set to begin on 17 October 2020, but on the eve of the season opener, all games were postponed indefinitely due to the ongoing COVID-19 pandemic. On 28 November 2020, the season was cancelled due to the Irish government's COVID-19 guidelines.

== Teams ==
Team	Stadium	City/Area	Last season
Ballincollig	Parochial Hall	Ballincollig, Cork	Div. 1 (promoted)
Belfast Star	De La Salle College	Belfast	1st
DCU Saints	DCU Sports Complex	Glasnevin, Dublin	6th
Éanna	Coláiste Éanna	Rathfarnham, Dublin	3rd
Killester	IWA Sports Hall	Clontarf, Dublin	7th
Killorglin	Killorglin Sports Complex	Killorglin	8th
Maree	Calasanctius College	Oranmore	10th
Moycullen	Kingfisher, NUIG	Galway	11th
Neptune	Neptune Stadium	Cork	9th
Templeogue	Nord Anglia International School	Leopardstown, Dublin	5th
Tralee Warriors	Tralee Sports Complex	Tralee	2nd
UCD Marian	UCD Sports Centre	Belfield, Dublin	4th

== League ==
The teams were split into North and South conferences. Teams were to play two home and away games against teams from their own Conference, and one match against teams from the opposing Conference, for a 16-game regular season. The conference lineups were announced on 7 July 2020.

=== Standings ===
==== North Conference ====
Pos	Team	Pld	W	L	PF	PA	PD	Pts	
1	Belfast Star	0	0	0	0	0	0	0	Qualification to semi-finals
2	DCU Saints	0	0	0	0	0	0	0	Qualification to semi-finals
3	Éanna	0	0	0	0	0	0	0	
4	Killester	0	0	0	0	0	0	0	
5	Templeogue	0	0	0	0	0	0	0	
6	UCD Marian	0	0	0	0	0	0	0	

Source: Basketball Ireland

==== South Conference ====
Pos	Team	Pld	W	L	PF	PA	PD	Pts	
1	Ballincollig	0	0	0	0	0	0	0	Qualification to semi-finals
2	Killorglin	0	0	0	0	0	0	0	Qualification to semi-finals
3	Maree	0	0	0	0	0	0	0	
4	Moycullen	0	0	0	0	0	0	0	
5	Neptune	0	0	0	0	0	0	0	
6	Tralee Warriors	0	0	0	0	0	0	0	

Source: Basketball Ireland

=== Results ===
Home \ Away	BAL	BEL	DCU	EAN	KIL	KLG	MAR	MOY	NEP	TEM	TW	UCD
Ballincollig	—											
Belfast Star		—										
DCU Saints			—									
Éanna				—								
Killester					—							
Killorglin						—						
Maree							—					
Moycullen								—				
Neptune									—			
Templeogue										—		
Tralee Warriors											—	
UCD Marian												—

First match(es) will be played: TBD. Source:
Legend: Blue = home team win; Red = away team win.
