= 2021–22 Irish Super League season =

- League: Super League
- Sport: Basketball
- Duration: 9 October 2021 – 13 March 2022 (Regular season); 19 March 2022 – 2 April 2022 (Playoffs)
- Number of teams: 12

Regular season
- Season MVP: Aaron Calixte (Tralee Warriors)
- Top scorer: Kason Harrell (Killester) (29.17ppg)
- National Cup champions: Tralee Warriors
- National Cup runners-up: Neptune

Playoffs
- Champions: Tralee Warriors
- Runners-up: Neptune

Super League seasons
- ← 2020–21 2022–23 →

The 2021–22 Irish Super League season was the 48th running of Basketball Ireland's premier men's basketball competition, following the cancellation of the 2020–21 season due to the COVID-19 pandemic. The season featured 12 teams from across the Republic of Ireland and Northern Ireland. Tralee Warriors were crowned National Cup and League champions.

== Teams ==
Team	Stadium	City/Area	2019–20 season
Ballincollig	Ballincollig Community School	Ballincollig, Cork	Div. 1 (promoted)
Belfast Star	De La Salle College	Belfast	1st
DCU Saints	DCU Sports Complex	Glasnevin, Dublin	6th
Éanna	Coláiste Éanna	Rathfarnham, Dublin	3rd
Killester	IWA Sports Hall	Clontarf, Dublin	7th
Killorglin	Killorglin Sports Complex	Killorglin	8th
Maree	Kingfisher, NUIG	Galway	10th
Moycullen	Kingfisher, NUIG	Galway	11th
Neptune	Neptune Stadium	Cork	9th
Templeogue	Nord Anglia International School	Leopardstown, Dublin	5th
Tralee Warriors	Tralee Sports Complex	Tralee	2nd
UCD Marian	UCD Sports Centre	Belfield, Dublin	4th

== Results ==
=== Regular season standings ===
==== North Conference ====
Pos	Team	Pld	W	L	PF	PA	PD	Pts	
1	Éanna	14	12	2	1228	1113	+115	36	Qualification to quarter-finals
2	Killester	14	9	5	1232	1139	+93	27	Qualification to quarter-finals
3	UCD Marian	14	6	8	1076	1060	+16	18	Qualification to quarter-finals
4	Templeogue	14	6	8	1080	1108	−28	18	Qualification to quarter-finals
5	DCU Saints	14	1	13	977	1239	−262	3	
6	Belfast Star*	0	0	0	0	0	0	0	Record expunged

Source: Basketball Ireland

*Belfast Star, with a 10–5 record, withdrew from the league before their final match of the regular season, due to a player registration error.

==== South Conference ====
Pos	Team	Pld	W	L	PF	PA	PD	Pts	
1	Ballincollig	15	14	1	1235	1035	+200	42	Qualification to quarter-finals
2	Tralee Warriors	15	10	5	1285	1199	+86	30	Qualification to quarter-finals
3	Neptune	15	9	6	1308	1217	+91	27	Qualification to quarter-finals
4	Maree	15	8	7	1282	1239	+43	24	Qualification to quarter-finals
5	Moycullen	15	3	12	1043	1214	−171	9	
6	Killorglin	15	2	13	1114	1297	−183	6	

Source: Basketball Ireland

=== Playoffs ===
==== Bracket ====
Quarter-finals
N1	Éanna	86
S4	Maree	77
S2	Tralee Warriors	88
N3	UCD Marian	71
S1	Ballincollig	85
N4	Templeogue	79
N2	Killester	84
S3	Neptune	90

Semi-finals
Éanna	57
Tralee Warriors	75
Ballincollig	75
Neptune	92

Final
Tralee Warriors	78
Neptune	72

==== Quarter-finals ====
19 March 2022

Éanna	86–77	Maree

Coláiste Éanna, Dublin

19 March 2022

Ballincollig	85–79	Templeogue

Ballincollig Community School, Cork

19 March 2022

Killester	84–90	Neptune

IWA Sports Hall, Dublin

19 March 2022

Tralee Warriors	88–71	UCD Marian

Tralee Sports Complex, Tralee

==== Semi-finals ====
26 March 2022

Report

Ballincollig	75–92	Neptune

Ballincollig Community School, Cork

27 March 2022

Report

Éanna	57–75	Tralee Warriors

Coláiste Éanna, Dublin

==== Final ====
YouTube

2 April 2022
19:00 GMT

Preview Report Report

Tralee Warriors	78–72	Neptune
Pts: Aaron Calixte (21)		Pts: Nil Sabata (21)

National Basketball Arena, Dublin
MVP: Aaron Calixte

== National Cup ==
=== Round 1 ===
30 October 2021

Belfast Star	69–98	Éanna

De La Salle College, Belfast

30 October 2021

DCU Saints	68–93	Killester

St. Vincent's C.B.S., Dublin

30 October 2021

Maree	85–83	Templeogue

NUIG Kingfisher, Galway

31 October 2021

Tralee Warriors	74–66	Ballincollig

Tralee Sports Complex, Tralee

=== Quarter-finals ===
4 December 2021

Maree	84–82	UCD Marian

Coláiste Bhaile Chláir, Galway

4 December 2021

Éanna	83–76	Killorglin

Coláiste Éanna, Dublin

4 December 2021

Killester	86–92	Neptune

IWA Sports Hall, Dublin

4 December 2021

Tralee Warriors	77–62	Moycullen

Tralee Sports Complex, Tralee

=== Semi-finals ===
YouTube

8 January 2022
17:00 GMT

Report

Éanna	70–79	Tralee Warriors
Pts: Romonn Nelson (17)		Pts: Nikola Roso (24)

Neptune Stadium, Cork

YouTube

8 January 2022
19:00 GMT

Report

Neptune	103–92	Maree
Pts: Cian Heaphy (23)		Pts: De'Ondre Jackson, Luka Kraljic (25)

Neptune Stadium, Cork

=== Final ===
YouTube

22 January 2022
18:00 GMT

Preview Report Box score

Neptune	75–88	Tralee Warriors
Scoring by quarter: 12–17, 16–26, 22–21, 25–24
Pts: Nil Sabata (21); Rebs: Colin O'Reilly (9); Asts: Roy Downey, Aleix Tarradellas (4)		Pts: Aaron Calixte, Daniel Jokubaitis (19); Rebs: Kieran Donaghy (11); Asts: Nikola Roso, Eoin Quigley (5)

National Basketball Arena, Dublin
MVP: Daniel Jokubaitis

Source: Basketball Ireland

== Awards ==
=== Player of the Month ===
Month	Player	Team	Ref
October	Aaron Calixte	Tralee Warriors	
November	Andre Nation	Ballincollig	
December	De'Ondre Jackson	Maree	
January	Daniel Jokubaitis	Tralee Warriors	
February	Andre Nation	Ballincollig	
March			

=== Coach of the Month ===
Month	Player	Team	Ref
October	John Dowling	Tralee Warriors	
November	Kieran O'Sullivan	Ballincollig	
December	Darren McGovern	Éanna	
January	John Dowling	Tralee Warriors	
February	Adrian Fulton	Belfast Star	
March			

=== Statistics leaders ===
Stats as of the end of the season (Note: Basketball Ireland's box scores and statistics records were of poor quality and reliability during the 2021–22 season.)

Category	Player	Team	Stat
Points per game	Kason Harrell	Killester	29.17
Rebounds per game	Tomas Fernandez Zerolo	Killester	13.08
Assists per game	Ciaran Roe	Killester	6.67
Steals per game	Eoin Quigley	Tralee Warriors	2.86
Blocks per game	James Claar	Belfast Star	2.17

=== Regular season ===
- Player of the Year: Aaron Calixte (Tralee Warriors)
- Young Player of the Year: Cian Heaphy (Neptune)
- Coach of the Year: John Dowling (Tralee Warriors)
- All-Star First Team:
  - Aaron Calixte (Tralee Warriors)
  - Andre Nation (Ballincollig)
  - Kason Harrell (Killester)
  - Nil Sabata (Neptune)
  - Roy Downey (Neptune)
- All-Star Second Team:
  - Daniel Jokubaitis (Tralee Warriors)
  - De'Ondre Jackson (Maree)
  - Jonathan Jean (UCD Marian)
  - Nikola Roso (Tralee Warriors)
  - Stefan Zečević (Éanna)
- All-Star Third Team:
  - Adrian O'Sullivan (Ballincollig)
  - Cian Heaphy (Neptune)
  - Eoin Quigley (Tralee Warriors)
  - Lorcan Murphy (Templeogue)
  - Milorad Sedlarevic (Ballincollig)
