= Bundle Day =

Bundle Day (in Swiss German Bündelitag) is an unofficial holiday in Switzerland on the last Saturday before the school year ends, when suitcases and "bundles" are packed for summer vacation.

The term "Bündelitag" probably had been used only in the region of Basel, but is nowadays widely spread across the germanophone regions of Switzerland since the holidays begin on the same date in most cantons. Although in a wider sense the term is also used for Saturdays off school before holidays in general, it is nationally used by media and calendars only before the summer vacation, because it marks its beginning in 11 cantons and therefore is the main travelling day in Switzerland. Depending on the holidays date determination the Bundle Day falls either on the last Saturday in June or on the first Saturday in July. In other cantons Bundle Day takes place simultaneously, but isn't nationally labelled "Bundle Day".

Since the five-day week has been introduced in most public schools the term has lost significance, because Saturdays are usually off school. Nonetheless Bundle Day as the first day of the summer vacation is still very popular and is often called an unofficial holiday, although it is not a public holiday.
