= Stefan Zečević =

Serbian basketball player

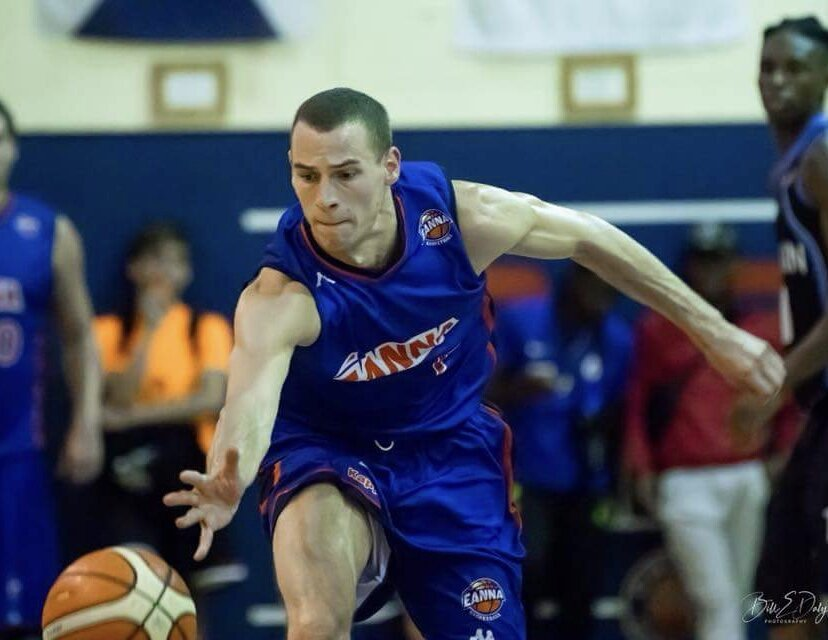
- Zečević with Eanna in 2018

No. 7 – Eanna
- Position: Shooting Guard / small forward
- League: Super League

Personal information
- Born: 3 April 1993 (age 33)
- Listed height: 6 ft 6 in (1.98 m)
- Listed weight: 200 lb (91 kg)

Career information
- High school: Asbury (Albertville, Alabama); Lee Academy (Lee, Maine)
- College: Bradley (2013–2014); Hill College (2014–2015); Keiser (2015–2017)
- NBA draft: 2017: undrafted
- Playing career: 2018–present

Career history
- 2018–2022: Éanna Basketball Club
- 2022–present: St. Vincent's Basketball Club

Career highlights
- Irish Super League All-Star First Team (2020); Irish Super League All-Star Second Team (2022); Irish National League Division 1 champion (2019)

Stefan Zečević (born 3 April 1993) is a Serbian professional basketball player for St. Vincent's Basketball Club of the Super League. Standing at 6 ft 6 in (1.98 m), he plays at the small forward position.

== Early life ==
Zečević hails from Kragujevac, Serbia. He played for the KK Radnički KG 06 junior team between 2009 and 2012.

== High school and college career ==
Zečević played high school basketball at Asbury High School in Albertville, Alabama. He attended Lee Academy prep school in Lee, Maine. Zečević played NCAA Division I college basketball at Bradley University in Peoria, Illinois, during the 2013–14 season. He transferred to Hill College in Hillsboro, Texas, where he played the 2014–15 season. Zečević played from 2015 to 2017 at Keiser University in West Palm Beach, Florida.

== Professional career ==
In August 2018, Zečević signed with Éanna Basketball Club for the 2018–19 Irish National League Division 1. He helped them win the championship and earn promotion to the Super League.

During the 2019–20 Irish Super League season, Zečević averaged 21.13 points, 9.26 rebounds and 2.43 assists per game. He was twice named Player of the Month and subsequently earned Super League All-Star First Team honours.

Zečević returned to Éanna in 2021. He went on to earn Super League All-Star Second Team honours in 2021–22.

In August 2022, Zečević signed with St. Vincent's Basketball Club for the 2022–23 basketball season.
