= Jonathan Williams (basketball, born 1996) =

American basketball player

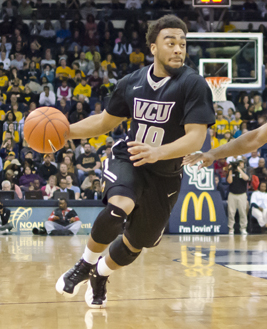
- Williams with the VCU Rams in 2014

Free agent
- Position: Point guard

Personal information
- Born: September 17, 1996 (age 29) Richmond, Virginia, U.S.
- Listed height: 6 ft 1 in (1.85 m)
- Listed weight: 200 lb (91 kg)

Career information
- High school: Saint Benedict's (Newark, New Jersey)
- College: VCU (2014–2018)
- NBA draft: 2018: undrafted
- Playing career: 2018, 2023–present

Career history
- 2018: Aris Leeuwarden
- 2023: Tralee Warriors
- 2024: Vevey Riviera Basket
- 2024–2025: Södertälje

Jonathan Leneze Williams (born September 17, 1996) is an American professional basketball player who last played for Södertälje of the Swedish Basketball League.

Standing at 6 ft 1 in (1.85 m), Williams plays as point guard for Tralee Warriors in the Irish Super League. He played college basketball for four seasons with the Virginia Commonwealth University Rams. In 2018, he played his first professional season for Aris Leeuwarden in the Netherlands. In August 2023, he signed with Tralee Warriors in the Irish Super League.

== College career ==
As a junior, Williams averaged 8.3 points and 3.1 assists per game but did not shoot the ball particularly well. In his final season with VCU, Williams averaged a career-high 9.3 points and 5.7 assists per game, which made him the assists leader of the Atlantic 10 Conference.

== Professional career ==
On July 14, 2018, Williams signed with Aris Leeuwarden of the Dutch Basketball League. On December 11, 2018, Williams left Aris after he asked for the termination of his contract to focus on recovery from injury. He played two games with Aris, in which he averaged 8 points and 2 rebounds per game.

In August 2023, he signed with Tralee Warriors in the Irish Super League. He made his debut on September 30, 2023, against Maigh Cuilinn.

Williams started the 2024–25 season with Vevey Riviera Basket in Switzerland. On December 28, 2024, he signed with Södertälje of the Swedish Basketball League.
