= De divisione naturae =

Book by Johannes Scotus

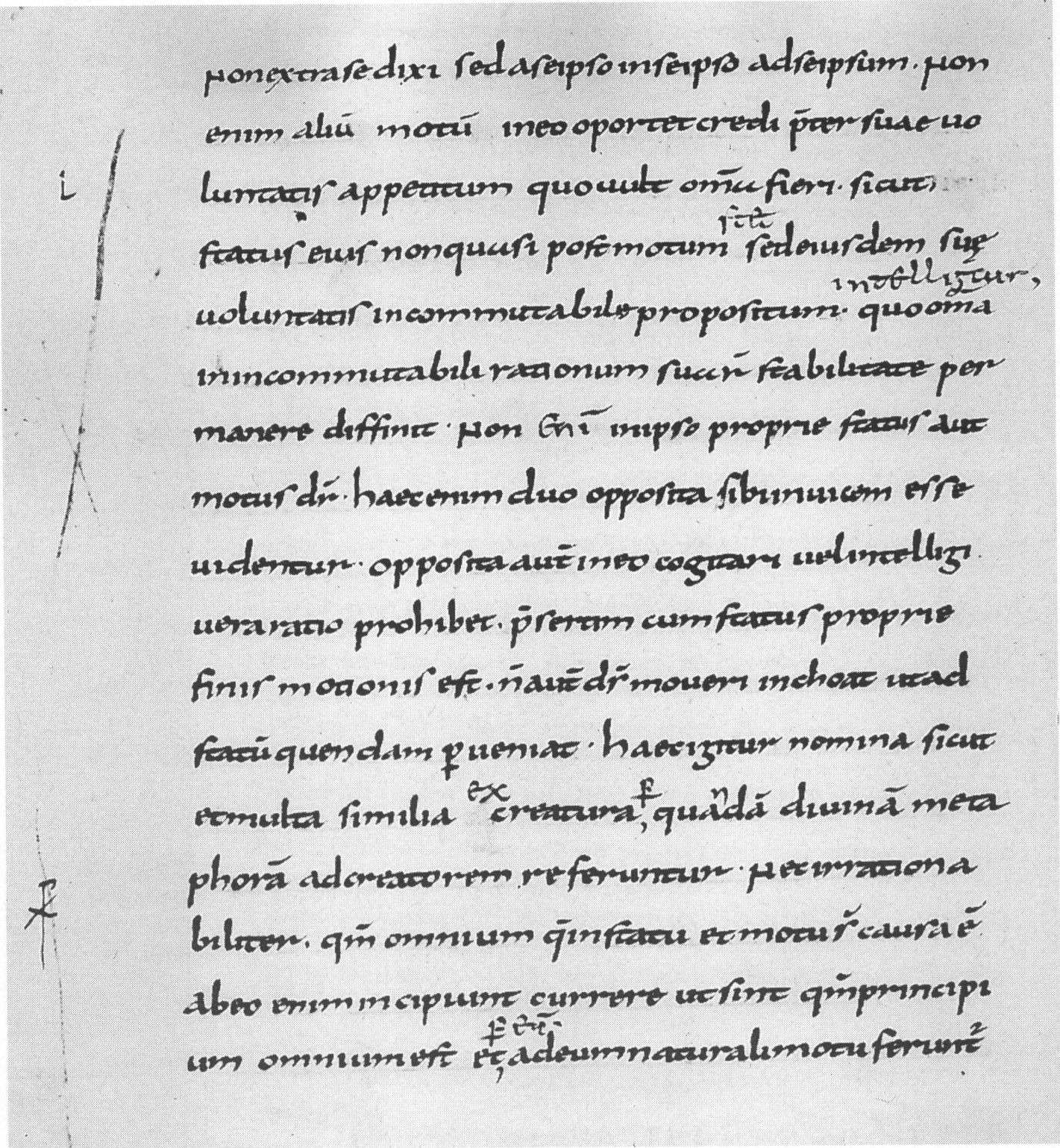
Eriugena, Periphyseon, Reims, 875

De Divisione Naturae ("The Division of Nature") is the title given by Thomas Gale to his edition (1681) of the work originally titled by 9th-century theologian Johannes Scotus Eriugena Periphyseon.

== Composition ==
The work was probably carried out beginning in the early 860s and completed around 866–67. This is based on a dedication in the book identifying as frater (brother) Wulfad, who was made a bishop in 866, making it unlikely that Eriugena would have used so casual a reference after that elevation. The work was not widely circulated in the author's lifetime. Eriugena was assisted by one, possibly two other persons in writing the book, based on the presence of margin notes indicating the penmanship of two separate persons. One of these is believed to have been Eriugena himself, while the script indicates that the second writer was a fellow Irishman.

== Four species of "Nature" ==
The work is arranged in five books. The original plan was to devote one book to each of the four divisions, but the topic of creation required expansion. The form of exposition is that of dialogue; the method of reasoning is the syllogism. Natura is the name for the universal, the totality of all things, containing in itself being and non-being. It is the unity of which all special phenomena are manifestations.

Eriugena develops a Neoplatonic cosmology according to which the infinite, transcendent and 'unknown' God, who is beyond being and non-being, through a process of self-articulation, procession, or 'self-creation', proceeds from his divine 'darkness' or 'non-being' into the light of being, speaking the Word who is understood as Christ, and at the same timeless moment bringing forth the Primary Causes of all creation... He treats of the essentially dialectical relation between Creator and created, where God expresses Himself in creation and creation culminates in return to the divine.

Within this nature, Eriugena distinguishes four species, although he theorizes that the distinction between beginning, middle and end is a result of the limits of human comprehension, and that the three are essentially one eternal process.

=== That which creates and is not created ===
The first of Eriugena's natures is God as the ground or origin of all things. Eriugena describes the "creation" of the world as really being a theophania, or showing forth of the Essence of God in the things created. Creation, for Eriugena, is a process of unfolding of the Divine Nature, wherein God reveals himself to the mind through the intellect, and to the senses through the created world.

=== That which is created and creates ===
Eriugena's second nature is the Platonic realm of primordial causes or ideas. These include goodness, wisdom, intuition (insight), understanding, virtue, greatness, power, and so on.

Eriugena holds that God the Father "created" these in God the Son, and that they in turn "create" by determining the generic and specific natures of concrete visible things. He describes them as, although created, identical with God, with their locus in God the Son, and therefore as being operative causes and not merely static types. Some critics interpret Eriugena as saying that the primordial causes are identical with God the Son; others, like the Catholic Encyclopedia, disagree.

=== That which is created and does not create ===
Eriugena describes his third nature as the place where the stream of reality, having set out from the first nature and passed through the second, enters the realm of space and time. Here the pure ideas take on the burden of matter and produce the appearance of reality, becoming subject to multiplicity, change, imperfection, and decay. In this, Eriugena attempts a reconciliation of Platonism with Aristotelian notions.

=== That which neither is created nor creates ===
The last of Eriugena's natures is God as the final end or goal of all things, that into which the world of created things ultimately returns. Eriugena describes the return to God as proceeding through the previous three steps in inverse order: elements become light, light becomes life, life becomes sense, sense becomes reason, reason becomes intellect, intellect becomes ideas in Christ, the Word of God, and through Christ returns to the oneness of God from which all the processes of nature began. For Eriugena, this "incorporation" in Christ takes place by means of divine grace in the Church, of which Christ is the invisible head.

== Commentary ==
French journalist and author Jean-Jacques Gabut says "Moreover, a certain pantheism, or rather pandeism, emerges from his work where Neo-Platonic inspiration perfectly complements the strict Christian orthodoxy." According to William Turner, professor of philosophy at Catholic University of America, the doctrine of the final return of all things to God shows very clearly the influence of Origen. In general, the system of thought outlined is a combination of neo-Platonic mysticism, emanationism, and pantheism which Eriugena strove in vain to reconcile with Aristotelian empiricism, Christian creationism, and theism. "The result is a body of doctrines loosely articulated, in which the mystic and idealistic elements predominate, and in which there is much that is irreconcilable with Catholic dogma."

Eriugena himself denied explicitly that he was a pantheist. "God is all in all. All things that are in God, even are God, are eternal...the creature subsists in God, and God is created in the creature in a wonderful and ineffable way, making himself manifest, invisible making himself visible...But the divine nature, he finally insists, because it is above being, is different from what it create within itself." Although Eriugena asserts the identity of God and creation, he explicitly rejects the view that God is the 'genus' or 'whole' (totum) of which the creatures are 'species' or 'parts'. Only metaphorically can it be said that God is a 'genus' or a 'whole'. Assertions concerning the immanence of God in creation are always balanced in Eriugena's writings by assertions of God's transcendence above all things."

De Divisione Naturae was condemned by a council at Sens by Honorius III (1225), for promoting the identity of God and creation, and by Pope Gregory XIII in 1585. In 1681, the long-lost work was found at Oxford University, and was immediately placed on the 'Index of Forbidden Books', a turn of events which likely actually spurred its popularity. Despite this result, Turner noted of Eriugena that "there can be no doubt that he himself abhorred heresy, was disposed to treat the heretic with no small degree of harshness..., and all through his life believed himself an unswervingly loyal son of the Church." Étienne Gilson also argued that Eriugena's alleged pantheism derived from a misunderstanding of the nature of "division" in the Periphyseon. Gilson writes that Eriugena's "nature" is not meant as a totality of which God and creatures are parts; or as a genus of which God and creatures would be species. He argues that God is not all things, nor are all things God, and that Eriugena explicitly calls such a division a monstrosity. (III, ro; 650 D). The division of nature signifies the act by which God expresses himself in hierarchical declension, and making himself known in a hierarchy of beings which are other than, and inferior to, him by being lesser grades of reality; "yet, in point of fact, Erigena only means that each and every creature is essentially a manifestation, under the form of being, of what is above being. The esse of a being is but a light radiated by the superesse, which is God."

In Main Currents of Marxism, the Polish philosopher Leszek Kołakowski identifies De divisione naturae as the archetype of Hegel's Phenomenology of Mind.

== Legacy ==
The Division of Nature has been described as a work which "synthesizes the philosophical accomplishments of fifteen centuries and appears as the final achievement of ancient philosophy." It is presented, like Alcuin's book, as a dialogue between Master and Pupil. Eriugena anticipates Thomas Aquinas, who said that one cannot know and believe a thing at the same time. Eriugena explains that reason is necessary to understand and interpret revelation. "Authority is the source of knowledge", but the reason of mankind is the norm by which all authority is judged.

== Sources ==
- Moran, Dermot. "John Scottus Eriugena". In Zalta, Edward N. (ed.). Stanford Encyclopedia of Philosophy. ISSN 1095-5054. OCLC 429049174.
