= Kieran Donaghy =

Gaelic footballer and basketball player

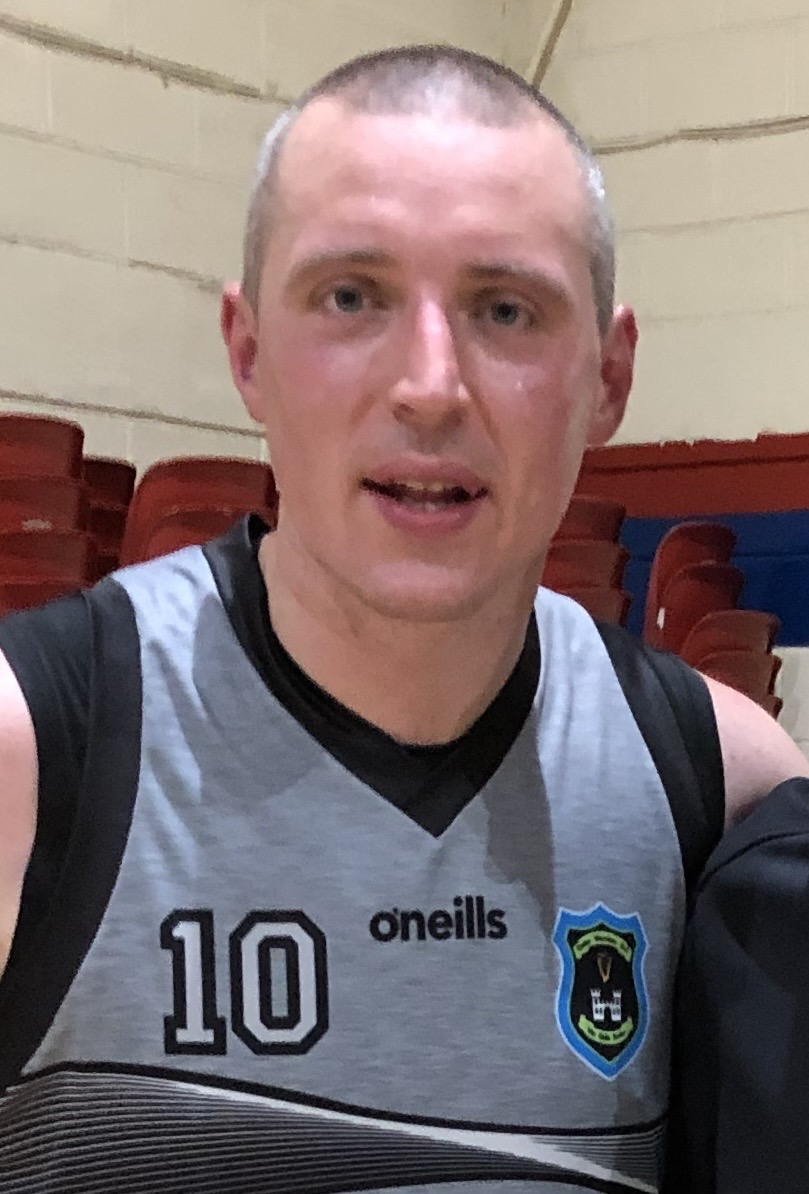
- Donaghy with Tralee Warriors in 2018

Personal information
- Native name: Ciarán Ó Duinneacha (Irish)
- Nickname: Star
- Born: 1 March 1983 (age 43) Kerry
- Occupation: Sales Manager
- Height: 1.96 m (6 ft 5 in)

Sport
- Sport: Gaelic football
- Position: Full Forward
Club
- Years: Club
- 2001–: Austin Stacks
Club titles
- Kerry titles: 2
- Munster titles: 1
Inter-county
| Years | County | Apps (scores) |
| 2004–2018 | Kerry | 60 (13–32) |
Inter-county titles
- Munster titles: 8
- All-Irelands: 4
- NFL: 3
- All Stars: 3

Kieran Donaghy (born 1 March 1983) is an Irish Gaelic football and hurling coach and former Gaelic football and basketball player. From Tralee club Austin Stacks, Donaghy played at senior level for the Kerry football team. Donaghy won four All-Ireland Senior Football Championship medals, eight Munster Championships and three National League titles with Kerry, and is the recipient of three All Stars Awards. He announced his retirement from inter-county football on 11 September 2018. Donaghy is also a long-time basketball player, with experience playing for Tralee Warriors in the Irish Super League.

== Inter-county ==
=== 2005 ===
Donaghy's emergence in 2006 was regarded as a "rags to riches story". In 2004, before he made his breakthrough on the Kerry senior side, Donaghy took part in the GAA reality TV show Underdogs on TG4. He played in a one-off game against Kerry while on the show. He made his Kerry debut against Dublin in 2005 and won a Munster Senior Football Championship (SFC) medal with the county that year. Donaghy previously played basketball for Tralee Tigers since a young age and represented his country at a number of underage levels.

=== 2006 ===
Donaghy began the 2006 Championship season as a midfield partner for Darragh Ó Sé and Kerry were crowned NFL champions. Donaghy began the Championship in the same position, as Kerry reached the Munster Championship final against old rivals Cork. Donaghy was sent off for two bookable offenses and he was banned for the subsequent replay, from which Cork emerged victorious. A round later in the Qualifiers against Longford, Donaghy was moved to the full forward position. It proved a very successful switch as he set up three goals, a number of points and scored a point himself. Against Armagh in the All-Ireland quarter-final, he scored a goal. Following alleged provocation that he was "only a basketball player" he goaded Armagh goalkeeper Paul Hearty in his celebrations after the goal - but later acknowledged his indiscretion. Kerry beat Cork in the semi-final and met Mayo in the All-Ireland final. Donaghy played a pivotal role in Kerry's winning by 4-15 to 3-05. He scored a 1-02 and set up another goal in the match. He later won an All Star award and was included in the GPA Team of the Year. He was named All Stars Footballer of the Year, GPA Footballer of the Year, Texaco Footballer of the Year and was hailed as the new Bomber Liston. He denied this, saying: "It's very flattering to be compared to him, but I'd need to play in a good few All-Ireland finals to be in the same league as him".

=== 2007 ===
Kerry won the 2007 Munster Championship, beating Cork in the final by two points. Donaghy set up Kerry's goal for Colm Cooper and got the score that put them ahead late in the game. Kerry then scraped past Monaghan in the All-Ireland quarter-final, to set up a semi-final clash with Dublin. After talisman Darragh Ó Sé went off injured, Donaghy was moved to midfield and did well against the much vaunted Ciarán Whelan. Kerry met Cork in the All-Ireland final, winning by 3-13 to 1-9 with Donaghy scoring two goals.

=== 2008 ===
During the 2008 NFL game against Mayo, Donaghy made a "middle finger" gesture to their fans who allegedly were throwing coins on to the field. He was punished with a one match suspension for the incident, and apologised. Kerry reached the 2008 NFL final, but were beaten by Derry. Then Cork beat Kerry in the 2008 Munster final. Kerry still managed to reach the All-Ireland final but came undone against Tyrone who won the game by four points. Donaghy managed a second All Star that year.

=== 2009 ===
On 11 July 2009, Donaghy was injured when he landed awkwardly during Kerry's victory over Longford in the football qualifiers. He left the ground on crutches. Scan results showed that he had suffered a broken bone in his foot and would likely to miss the rest of the 2009 Championship. Kerry went on to win the All-Ireland that year, beating Cork in the final.

=== 2010 ===
Kerry lost at the quarter-final stage for the first time since the creation of the back-door system, losing to Down 1-10 to 1-16.

=== 2011 ===
Kerry lost to Dublin in the 2011 All-Ireland final by a single point. In a tight game Donaghy kicked the equalising point late on before Stephen Cluxton kicked the winner in injury time.

=== 2012 ===
In the 2012 Championship Kerry fell to Donegal in the most unexpected of circumstances - an All-Ireland quarter-final in early August.

=== 2013 ===
Kerry would lose to old rivals Dublin in an epic semi-final in 2013. Injury would take its toll on Donaghy throughout the 2013 season and he would spend the majority of the season as an impact sub.

=== 2014 ===
In 2014 Donaghy went on to play a pivotal role in Kerry's 37th All-Ireland Football Championship. In the semi-final vs Mayo, he came on as a substitute in the closing minutes of a game that was felt by many to be beyond saving and was vital in assisting a goal that led to a draw. In the subsequent replay he scored a vital goal which helped Kerry to win a place in the Final. In the final against Donegal, after a tight 51 mins Donaghy capitalised on a Paul Durcan mistake on a kick out to put Kerry up 2-05 to 0-07. Kerry were able to hold on despite late pressure to achieve their 37th All-Ireland, with much of the credit going to the revived Donaghy. His post match interview became famous for the catchphrase "Well Joe Brolly what do you think of that?"

Following his club's victory in the 2014 Kerry Championship he was named Kerry Captain for 2015. He later went on to win the Munster Club championship with Austin Stacks.

=== 2015 ===
Kerry would reach the final again in 2015 losing to Dublin with Donaghy coming off the bench in the second half.

=== 2016 ===
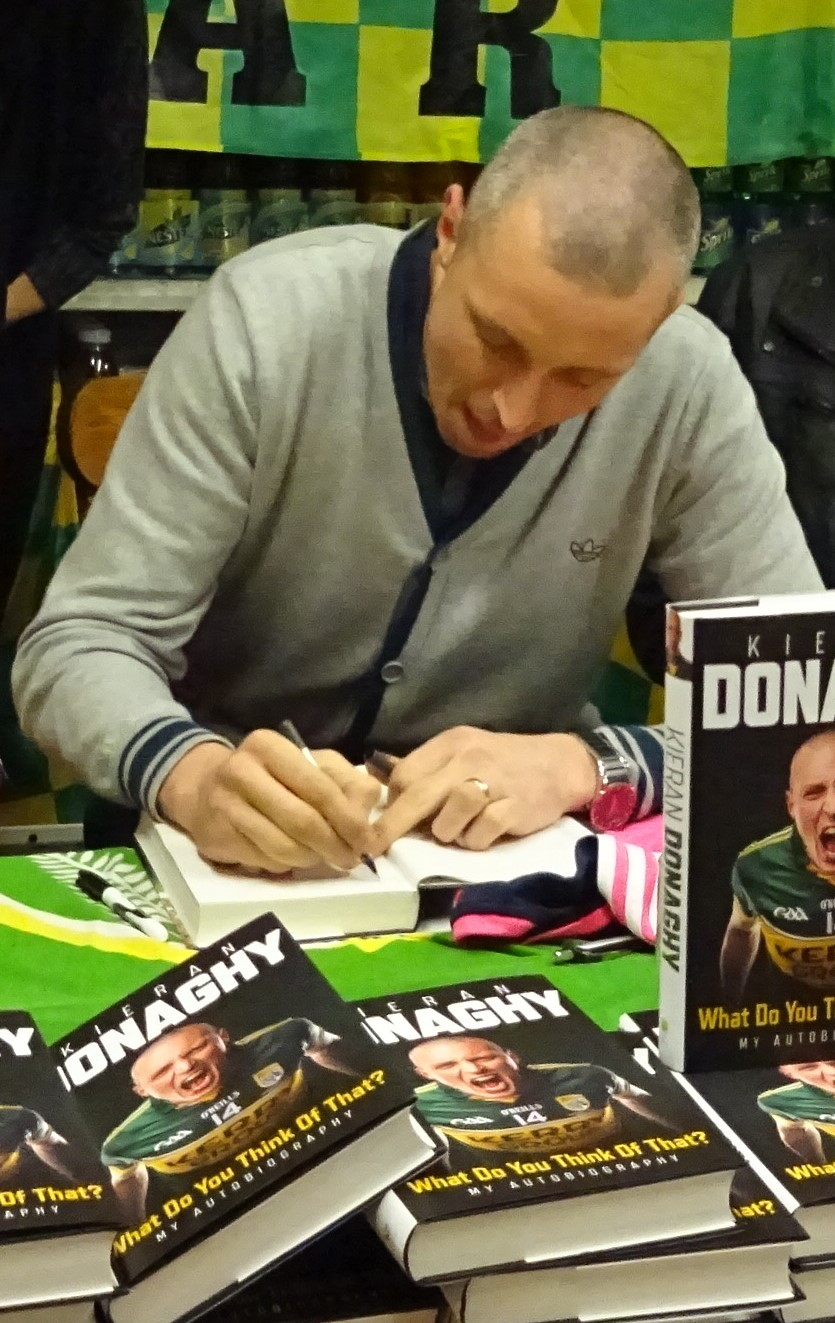
Donaghy signing his book in 2016

Donaghy would take part in the 2016 semi-final losing to Dublin. He released his autobiography What Do You Think of That on 20 October 2016.

=== 2017 ===
Donaghy received a red card in the closing minutes of Kerry's semi-final defeat to Mayo after an incident with Mayo's Aidan O'Shea.

=== Other ===
Donaghy won the Kerry Under 21 Football Championship with Tralee District in 2001, Austin Stacks in 2002 and lost the final with Stacks in 2003.

He played in losing County Senior Championship Finals in 2001, 2010 and 2013 with Austin Stacks.

Donaghy has represented Ireland in the International Rules Series in 2006 and 2008.

Donaghy has played for Munster in the Railway Cup.

== Basketball ==
In 2005, Donaghy won a National Cup title with Tralee Tigers and was named the player of the year. In 2008, he helped Tralee win the Superleague with 22 points in the final. In 2016, he joined Tralee Warriors for their first season in the Super League. On 2 April 2017, a late free throw by Donaghy ensured Tralee Warriors were crowned Champions Trophy winners in a 74–73 overtime win over league champions Templeogue. Donaghy was named MVP of the game after recording 15 points, 16 rebounds and a game-high eight assists. He re-joined Tralee Warriors for the 2017–18 season and the 2018–19 season. In March 2019, he helped Tralee Warriors win the Super League for the first time, as they finished on top of the table with a league-best 16–4 record. In the 2021–22 season, he helped Tralee Warriors win the Irish National Cup and the League championship. As a 39-year-old, he continued with Tralee in the 2022–23 season.

== Coaching ==
Donaghy had a role as a performance coach for the senior Galway county hurling team. He served as joint manager of the IT Tralee that competed in the 2020 Sigerson Cup. In December 2020, Kieran McGeeney announced Donaghy as a member of his Armagh county senior management backroom team, though his exact role was not outlined at the time. His involvement with Armagh was originally meant for one season, but he continued and was involved when Armagh won the 2024 All-Ireland SFC final. Donaghy left his role in July 2025, expressing gratitude to McGeeney for taking "a chance on a rookie coach".

== Media work ==
In 2019, Donaghy joined the Sky Sports GAA panel for their coverage of the All-Ireland Senior Football Championship.

Donaghy was the subject of an episode of Laochra Gael (S18 e1), which aired on TG4 on 5 March 2020.

== Personal life ==
Donaghy's father was from County Tyrone. He is a cousin of Siobhan Donaghy, who is a member of the Sugababes.

In January 2013, he married long-term girlfriend Hilary Stephenson at St Finian's Church in Waterville, County Kerry. They have two daughters Lola Rose (b.2015) and Indie (b.2017)
