= John Scotus Eriugena =

Irish Catholic philosopher and theologian (c. 800 – c. 877)

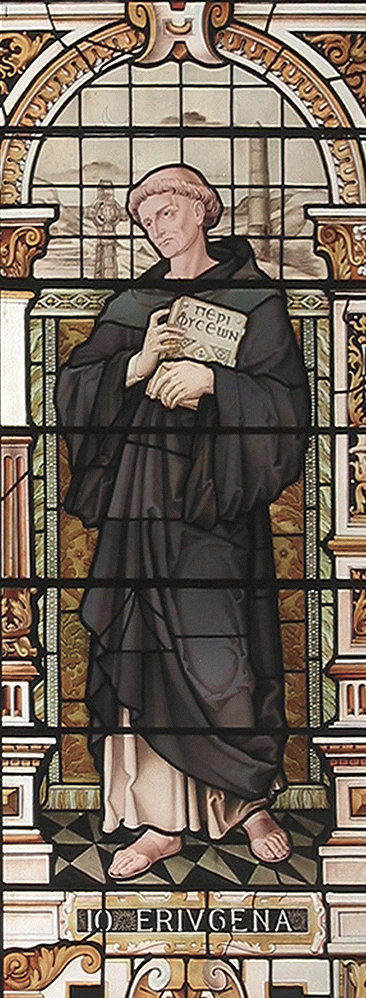
- Stained glass window in the chapel of Emmanuel College, Cambridge (1884) (Note: Depicted as an early Benedictine monk, holding his book De Divisione Naturae. Behind him, seen against the night-sky, are an Irish Round Tower and a Celtic cross.)
- Born: c. 800; Gaelic Ireland
- Died: c. 877 (age c. 77) probably West Francia or Kingdom of Wessex
- Other names: Johannes Scottus Eriugena, Johannes Scotus Erigena, Johannes Scottigena

Philosophical work
- Era: Medieval philosophy
- Region: Western philosophy
- School: Neoplatonism; Augustinianism
- Main interests: Free will, logic, metaphysics
- Notable ideas: Four divisions of nature, God's two books

John Scotus Eriugena, (Note: /dʒɒn ˈskoʊtəs ærˈjuːdʒənə/) also known as Johannes Scotus Erigena, (Note: /dʒoʊˈhæniːz ˈskoʊtəs ɪˈrɪdʒənə/; ecclesiastical Latin: [joˈannes ˈskotus eˈridʒena].) John the Scot or John the Irish-born (c. 800 – c. 877), was an Irish Neoplatonic philosopher, theologian and poet of the Early Middle Ages. Bertrand Russell dubbed him "the most astonishing person of the ninth century". The Stanford Encyclopedia of Philosophy states that he "is the most significant Irish intellectual of the early monastic period. He is generally recognized to be both the outstanding philosopher (in terms of originality) of the Carolingian era and of the whole period of Latin philosophy stretching from Boethius to Anselm".

He wrote a number of works, but is best known today for having written De Divisione Naturae ("The Division of Nature"), or Periphyseon, which has been called the "final achievement" of ancient philosophy, a work which "synthesizes the philosophical accomplishments of fifteen centuries". The principal concern of De Divisione Naturae is to unfold from φύσις (physis), which John defines as "all things which are and which are not", the entire integrated structure of reality. Eriugena achieves this through a dialectical method elaborated through exitus and reditus, that interweaves the structure of the human mind and reality as produced by the λόγος (logos) of God.

Eriugena is generally classified as a Neoplatonist, though he seems to have been influenced more by the anonymous and pseudepigraphic 6th century Christian author of the Corpus Areopagitica, rather than by the work of pagan philosophers such as Plotinus or Iamblichus. Relying exclusively on Christian theology and the Canon, Eriugena "reinvented the greater part of the theses of Neoplatonism".

He succeeded Alcuin of York (c. 735–804) as head of the Palace School at Aachen. Eriugena's predecessor, Alcuin, is well-known as the Magister recruited by Charlemagne to revive the study of the liberal arts--the trivium and quadrivium--whose transmission had fallen into a much deteriorated and low estate in the west.

He was one of the few Western European philosophers of his day who knew Greek, having studied it in Ireland. A later medieval tradition recounts that Eriugena was stabbed to death by his students at Malmesbury with their pens, although this may rather be allegorical.

== Name ==
The form "Eriugena" is used by John Scotus to describe himself in one manuscript. It means "Ireland (Ériu)-born". "Scottus" in the Middle Ages was the Latin term for "Irish or Gaelic", so his full name translates as "John, the Irish-born Gael". "Scotti" was the late Latin term for the Irish people, with Ireland itself being Scotia (or in the Medieval period "Scotia Major", to distinguish it from Scotia Minor, i.e. modern Scotland). The spelling "Scottus" has the authority of the early manuscripts until perhaps the 11th century. Occasionally he is also named "Scottigena" ("Irish-born") in the manuscripts.

According to Jorge Luis Borges, John's byname may therefore be construed as the repetitious "Irish Irish".

He is not to be confused with the later, Scottish philosopher John Duns Scotus.

== Life ==
Johannes Scotus Eriugena was educated in Ireland. He moved to France (about 845) at the invitation of Carolingian King Charles the Bald. He succeeded Alcuin of York (735–804), the leading scholar of the Carolingian Renaissance, as head of the Palace School. The reputation of this school increased greatly under Eriugena's leadership, and he was treated with indulgence by the king. Whereas Alcuin was a schoolmaster rather than a philosopher, Eriugena was a noted Greek scholar, a skill which, though rare at that time in Western Europe, was used in the learning tradition of Early and Medieval Ireland, as evidenced by the use of Greek script in medieval Irish manuscripts. He remained in France for at least thirty years, and it was almost certainly during this period that he wrote his various works. An early 9th century manuscript of De Divisione Naturae (shelfmarked 'Reims, Bibliothèque Municipale, MS 875') seems to contain marginal corrections of the text written in John Erigena's own hand.

The latter part of his life is unclear. There is a story that in 882 he was invited to Oxford by Alfred the Great, laboured there for many years, became abbot at Malmesbury, and was stabbed to death by his pupils with their styli. Whether this is to be taken literally or figuratively is not clear, and some scholars think it may refer to some other Johannes. William Turner says the tradition has no support in contemporary documents and may well have arisen from some confusion of names on the part of later historians.

He probably never left France, and the date of his death is generally given as 877. From the evidence available, it is impossible to determine whether he was a cleric or a layman; the general conditions of the time make it likely that he was a cleric and perhaps a monk.

== Theology ==
Eriugena's work is largely based upon Origen, St. Augustine of Hippo, Pseudo-Dionysius the Areopagite, St. Maximus the Confessor, and the Cappadocian Fathers. Eriugena's overall view of reality, both human and divine, was strongly influenced by Neoplatonism. He viewed the totality of reality as a "graded hierarchy" cosmology of gradual declensions from the Godhead, similar to Proclus, and likewise saw in all things a dual movement of procession and reversion: that every effect remains in its cause or constitutive principle, proceeds from it, and returns to it. According to Deirdre Carabine, both "ways" must be understood as intrinsically entwined and are not separate movements or processes.

"For the procession of the creatures and the return of the same are so intimately associated in the reason which considers them that they appear to be inseparable the one from the other, and it is impossible for anyone to give any worthy and valid account of either by itself without introducing the other, that is to say, of the procession without the return and collection and vice versa."

John Scotus Eriugena was also a devout Catholic. Pittenger argues that, too often, those who have written about him seem to have pictured John as one who spent his life in the endeavor to dress up his own personal Neoplatonism in a thin Christian garb, but who never quite succeeded in disguising his real tendency. "This is untrue and unfair. Anyone who has taken the trouble to read Erigena, and not merely to read about him, and more particularly one who has studied the De Divisione Naturae sympathetically, cannot question the profound Christian faith and devotion of this Irish thinker nor doubt his deep love for Jesus Christ, the incarnate Son of God. In the middle of long and some what arid metaphysical discussions, one comes across occasional passages such as the following, surely the cry of a passionately Christian soul: O Domine Jesu, nullum aliud praemium, nullam aliam beatitudinem, nullum aliud gaudium a te postulo, nisi ut ad purum absque ullo errore fallacis theoriae verba tua, quae per tuum sanctum Spiritum inspirata sunt, intelligam (Migne ed., ioioB)." The Greek Fathers were Eriugena's favourites, especially Gregory the Theologian, and Basil the Great. Of the Latins he prized Augustine most highly. The influence of these was towards freedom and not towards restraint in theological speculation. This freedom he reconciled with his respect for the teaching authority of the Church as he understood it.

=== On the Body and Blood of the Lord ===
The first of the works attributed to Eriugena during this period was a pseudepigraphal treatise on the Eucharist, On the Body and Blood of the Lord. In it, he seems to have advanced the doctrine that the Eucharist was merely symbolical or commemorative, an opinion for which Berengar of Tours was at a later date censured and condemned at the Council of Vercelli in 1050. As a part of his penance, Berengarius is said to have been compelled to publicly burn this treatise. We now know this treatise was not written by Eriugena, but written by Ratramnus of Corbie. An English translation survives as The Book of Ratramn.

=== De Divina Praedestinatione ===
Eriugena was considered orthodox by his authorities and a few years later was selected by Hincmar, archbishop of Reims, to defend the doctrine of liberty of will against the monk Gottschalk (Gotteschalchus), whose view of predestination followed that of Augustinianism. The Catholic Church condemned Gottschalk's at the Council of Quiersy 835. The treatise De Divina Praedestinatione composed for this occasion has been preserved, and it was probably from its content that Eriugena's orthodoxy became suspect. Eriugena argues the question of predestination entirely on speculative grounds, and starts with the bold affirmation that philosophy and religion are fundamentally one and the same. Even more significant is his handling of authority and reason. Eriugena offered a brief proof that there can be predestination only for the good, for all folk are summoned to be saints.

Augustine's view of predestination prefigured the debate as such: human beings cannot will what is good without the action of divine grace. Since they are dependent upon grace, it follows that human beings cannot save themselves; that means, some people are predestined to salvation.

Eriugena's view, as he sets it out in this "rather hastily written treatise", is that because God is simple and unchangeable, there can be nothing at all that can be predestined. Eriugena explains God's predestination as God's knowledge of the primordial causes. Carabine outlines Eriugena's argument against double-predestination as follows: God cannot predestine the human will, and people are blessed or punished because of their own free will. Since the free will of human beings can be misused, sins must be the fault of individuals. Sin and evil, and the fact that some souls are damned, cannot imply a change in God or a defect in God's power; if we accept the view of Gottschalk, God is responsible for sin and evil. Eriugena's way out of this difficult position is based on the Neoplatonic idea that God as good is simply existence and, therefore, the opposite of non-being. Evil and sin are negations that do not, in fact, exist and cannot be caused by God.

"In addition to the arguments based on the dialectical understanding of being and non-being and the unity of God's nature, Eriugena also invokes the principles of negative theology in his answer to Gottschalk's heresy. Foreknowledge and predestination imply temporal notions in God, who transcends time. Since God is simple and unchanging, ideas, signs, and language cannot properly signify the divine nature."

Thus, God cannot predestine any soul to damnation; rather, human sinfulness creates its own hell. This was, in brief, the case Eriugena presented to Hincmar for scrutiny. On one hand, against Gottschalk, Eriugena had followed Augustine in that the faults of the wicked and their resulting damnation are their own responsibility. But since Eriugena had denied the possibility of the predestination of the elect to eternal bliss, he had contradicted Augustine; for this reason, Hincmar ultimately rejected the treatise.

The work was warmly assailed by Drepanius Florus, canon of Lyons, and Prudentius, and was condemned by two councils: that The Council of Valence III 855, and that of Langres in 859. By the former council his arguments were described as Pultes Scotorum ("Irish porridge") and commentum diaboli ("an invention of the devil").

=== Translation of the Corpus Areopagiticum ===
At some point in the centuries before Eriugena, a legend had developed that Saint Denis, the first Bishop of Paris and patron saint of the important Abbey of Saint-Denis, was the same person as both the Dionysius the Areopagite mentioned in Acts 17.34, and Pseudo-Dionysius the Areopagite, a figure whose writings were not yet being circulated in the West in the ninth century. Accordingly, in the 820s ambassadors from the Byzantine emperor to the court of Louis the Pious donated to Louis a Greek manuscript of the Dionysian corpus, which was immediately given to the Abbey of Saint Denis in the care of Abbot Hilduin, who proceeded to direct a translation of the Dionysian corpus from Greek into Latin, based on this single manuscript.

Soon after, probably by the middle of the ninth century, Eriugena made a second Latin translation of the Dionysian corpus, and much later wrote a commentary on "The Celestial Hierarchy". This constitutes the first major Latin reception of the Areopagite. It is unclear why Eriugena made a new translation so soon after Hilduin's. It has often been suggested that Hilduin's translation was deficient; though this is a possibility, it was a serviceable translation. Another possibility is that Eriugena's creative energies and his inclination toward Greek theological subjects motivated him to make a new translation.

Eriugena's next work was a Latin translation of Dionysius the Areopagite undertaken under the patronage of Charles the Bald. A translation of the Areopagite's writings was not likely to alter the opinion already formed as to Eriugena's orthodoxy. Pope Nicholas I was offended that the work had not been submitted for approval before being given to the world, and ordered Charles to send Eriugena to Rome, or at least to dismiss him from his court. There is no evidence, however, that this order was carried out.

At the request of the Byzantine emperor Michael III (c. 858), Eriugena completed the translation into Latin of the works of Pseudo-Dionysius, adding his own commentary. With this translation, he continued in the tradition of St. Augustine and Boethius in introducing the ideas of Neoplatonism from the Greek into the Western European intellectual tradition, where they were to have a strong influence on Christian theology.

He also translated St. Gregory of Nyssa's De hominis opificio and St. Maximus Confessor's Ambigua ad Iohannem.

=== De Divisione Naturae ===
==== Scope of the work ====
Eriugena's magnum opus, De Divisione Naturae (On the Division of Nature) or Periphyseon, is arranged in five books. It has been called the "final achievement" of ancient philosophy, a work which "synthesizes the philosophical accomplishments of fifteen centuries." The form of exposition is that of a catechetical dialogue between a theologian and his pupil, and the method of reasoning is the ancient syllogistic. Nature (Natura in Latin or physis [φύσις] in Greek) is the name of the most comprehensive of all unities, that which contains within itself the most primary division of all things, that which is (being) and that which is not (nonbeing). It is presented, like Alcuin's book, as a dialogue between Master and Pupil. Eriugena anticipates St. Thomas Aquinas, who said that one cannot know and believe a thing at the same time. (Note: Quote by Norman Geisler: 'Although Aquinas does not actually separate faith and reason, he does distinguish them formally. We cannot both know and believe the same thing at the same time. For "whatever things we know with scientific knowledge properly so called we know by reducing them to first principles which are naturally present to the understanding. All scientific knowledge terminates in the sight of a thing which is present [whereas faith is always in something absent]. Hence, it is impossible to have faith and scientific knowledge about the same thing."')

Eriugena explains that reason is necessary to understand and interpret revelation. "Authority is the source of knowledge, but the reason of mankind is the norm by which all authority is judged."

Sergei N. Shushkov has challenged the dominant strains of Eriugena scholarship in pointing out these key points regarding the approach to the structure, internal progression and purpose of the De Divisione Naturae:

1. Rather than the specific divisions of Nature, the modes of interpreting being and non-being are to the true constitutive subject-matter of each book of the Periphyseon (hence, of the five parts of his system, yet four divisions).
2. The fourfold division of Nature is to be interpreted not as a basic structure of the system offered by Eriugena, but as a means of introducing dialectic to the body of theology through discourse and negation of St. Augustine's specific metaphysical hierarchy, indicating the way of resolution of the cardinally theological contradiction (God does and does not create at the same time).
3. Thus one should not associate Eriugena's work with exploration of the division of God's Nature but rather reinterpret it as an immense anti-division project to be understood as an important turn in the history of Christian thought entirely focused on the truth of God's unity and perfection, and the lived human life assenting to it.

==== The fourfold divisions of nature ====
The Latin title refers to these four divisions of nature:

1. Creating and not created.
2. Created and creating.
3. Created and not creating.
4. Not creating and not created.

The first is God as the ground or origin of all things; the second, Platonic ideas or forms as logoi, following St. Maximus and Augustinian exemplarism; the third, corporeal world of phenomena and formed matter world; and the last is God as the final end or goal of all things, and that into which the world of created things ultimately returns. The third division is the dialectical counterpart to the first, the fourth to the second. The inspiration of this division comes from Augustine's City of God, "The cause of things, therefore which makes but is not made, is God; but all other causes both make and are made." The first and fourth divisions are to be understood of God, regarded alternately as the efficient and sustaining cause of all as dependent upon Him, and the teleological end of all:

Let us then make an “analytical” or regressive collection of each of the two pairs of the four forms we have mentioned so as to bring them into a unity. The first, then, [and] fourth are one since they are understood of God [alone]. For He is the Principle of all things which have been created by Him, and the end of all things which seek Him so that in Him they may find their eternal and immutable rest. For the reason why the Cause of all things is said to create is that it is from it that the universe of those things which have been created after it (and) [by it] proceeds by a wonderful and divine multiplication into genera and species and individuals, and into differentiations and all those other features which are observed in created nature; but because it is to the same Cause that all things that proceed from it shall return when they reach their end, it is therefore called the end of all things and is said neither to create nor to be created. For once all things have returned to it nothing further will proceed from it by generation in place and time (and) genera and forms since in it all things will be at rest and will remain an indivisible and immutable One. For those things which in the processions of natures appear to be divided and partitioned into many are in the primordial causes unified and one, and to this unity they will return and in it they will eternally and immutably remain. But this fourth aspect of the universe, which, like the first also, is understood to exist in God alone, will receive a more detailed treatment in its proper place, as far as the Light of Minds shall grant (us). Now what is said of the first and fourth, that is to say, that neither the one nor the other is created since both the one and the other are One—for both are predicated of God—will not be obscure, I think, to any who use their intelligence aright. For that which has no cause either superior to or equal with itself is created by nothing. For the First Cause of all things is God, whom nothing precedes (nor) is anything understood (to be) in conjunction with Him which is not coessential with Him. Do you see, then, that the first and fourth forms of nature have been reduced to a unity?

These divisions are not to be understood as separated and within the nature of God, but rather they are not God at all but our thought of God because we are compelled, by the very constitution of our minds, to think of a beginning and an end. The second and the third divisions, however, do not merely exist in our thought, but in things themselves and are the things in themselves, in which causes and effects are actually divided. The second division represents the primordial causes, of which the Logos is the unity and the aggregate. All that we see divided and a multiplicity in nature is one in the primal causes. The third division represents the created universe; it is all that is known in generation, in time and in space. These divisions of Nature do not mean that God is the genus of the creature, or the creature a species of God, though Gregory Nazianzen does say, pars Dei sumus, which is a metaphorical use of language, to express the truth that in God we live and move and have our being, which Eriugena himself follows. The four divisions are an example of analysis descending from the most general to the most special, and then reversing the process, and resolving individuals into species, species into genera, genera into essences, and ‘essences into the wisdom of the Deity, from where all these divisions arose and where they end.

==== Modes of non-being ====
Next in importance to the fourfold division of Nature for the understanding of Eriugena's philosophy, is his fivefold division of non-being. It is fundamental to Erigena's scheme that Nature, as the general name for all things, comprises both the things which are and the things which are not. All that is perceived by the senses or understood by the intellect is said to be (esse). The five modes of non-being are as follows:

1. Non-being as the ineffable Godhead: All that by reason of the excellence of its nature (per excellentiam suae naturae) escapes the reach of the senses and of the intellect. The essence of all things belongs to this category. Whatever is known is a kind of accident of the underlying, unknown and unknowable substance. We know anything by quality and quantity, form, matter, difference, time and space. But the essence of it, to which these attach themselves, we cannot know. Since this essence cannot be known by us, it does not exist for us.
2. Non-being as the inaccessibility of the higher to the lower: Derived from the first mode of non-being, in the order of Nature, the affirmation of the higher existence is the denial of the lower, and the denial of the lower existence is the affirmation of the higher. Anything is, in so far as it is ‘known by itself or by what is above it; it is not, in so far as it cannot be comprehended by what is below it.
3. Non-being as all latent or seminal or potential existence: All men who will ever exist were potentially created in the first man; all plants that will ever exist now exist potentially in the seed of existing plants. But in this sense, actual existence is existence, and potential existence is non-existence.
4. Non-being as that which is phenomenal and material: All that exists by generation as a form of matter in space and time, and is liable to increase and decrease. All this is not, in the full sense of being. Only what is solely comprehended by the intellect is real being. All else is appearance and not reality.
5. Non-being as sin: This last mode of non-being belongs only to human nature. Man properly is in so far as he is in the image of God: in so far a he loses the image of God through sin, he is not. When is restored to him in Christ, he is again, as St. Paul the Apostle says: Who calleth the things that are not as though they were.

==== Cataphatic and apophatic theology ====
This dimension of Eriugena's theology consists largely of his direct intellectual inheritance from Pseudo-Dionysius the Areopagite. While the same predicate may rightly be affirmed and denied of God, the affirmation is metaphorical (metaphorice) yet truly indicative, the denial is literal (proprie). This depends upon the fact that every human thought involves a contrary, and God, as the Absolute, is beyond all oppositions, for he is the reconciliation and the resolution of contraries and tensions. Therefore, for Eriugena, God may be said to be essentia, as he is conceived to be the essence of all that is, yet strictly he is not essentia (of which the contrary is nihil) because God is beyond opposition, so he is more appropriately super-essentia. Similarly, he is more-than-good and more-than-goodness, more-than-eternal, and more-than-eternity. The use of phrases like these is the attempt to unite the affirmation and the negation in one statement, since the Absolute involves both the positive and the negative. But, as Eriugena sees it, every one of these attempts to express the nature of God by super- is really a negation. To say that God is superessential is not to say what he is, but what he is not. God indeed is beyond all words, and all thought, for he surpasses all intellect, and is better known by not knowing, and is more truly denied in all things than affirmed.

==== Theophany ====
It is therefore one of Eriugena's fundamental tenets that it is impossible to know God as He is. We know that He is, but not what He is. He is known to be only through the things He has created, that is, He is known only by theophany, as Dionysius the Areopagite before him argued. The sense which Eriugena attaches to this phrase is not particularly clear or consistent. It seems generally to mean every manifestation of God through the medium of the creation. But it is only the devout soul that is prepared to receive the higher manifestations, and it is only to such souls that these are given. The words of Maximus are quoted as a definition of theophany in the narrower sense. "As far as the human mind ascends in love, so far the divine wisdom descends in mercy." The "creation" of the world is in reality a theophania, or showing forth of the Essence of God in the things created. Just as He reveals Himself to the mind and the soul in higher intellectual and spiritual truth, so He reveals Himself to the senses in the created world around us. Creation is, therefore, a process of unfolding of the Divine Nature. Theophany, therefore, in this more restricted sense, is, on the part of man, an ascent to God in which every good desire and deed is a step, and on the part of God, a revelation of Himself to the human spirit in such fashion as our intelligence can understand.

==== The nature of God ====
God is ἄναρχος (ánarkhos), that is; without beginning, uncaused, the absolutely self-sufficient, uniquely possessing aseitas. The essence of God is incomprehensible, as is the οὐσία of all that exists. But as our human intellect, which is one and invisible in itself, yet manifests itself in words and deeds, and expresses its thought in letters, and figures, so the Divine Essence, which is far above the reach of our intellect, manifests itself in the created universe. In this sense, it may even be said to be created, in those things which are made by it and through it and in it. Eriugena is fundamentally following St. Paul the Apostle here in saying that the Divine Nature is made, where the Word of God is born in the heart. So the Divine Nature may, in this strictly qualified sense, be said to create itself inasmuch as it creates from itself the nature of things.

===== Filioque =====
While God is ἄναρχος, strictly speaking Eriugena argues, only the Father is ἄναρχος, since the Son and the Spirit have a principium in the Father and are generated and cospirated respectively. While Eriugena does rely on the Greeks even more so than the Western Fathers, and at times does show sympathy to Constantinople, he is a staunch defender of the theology of the filioque clause. Eriugena argues that, as the Holy Spirit proceeds from the Father through the Son, so the Son is born of the Father through the Holy Spirit both in the Incarnation and, in a much different sense, in baptism. Others, reading his works more closely, conclude that he was in fact criticizing the "double procession" interpretation of the Filioque in the carolingian theologians and aligning more with the Greek view. He declares that only the Father is cause and expirator of the Holy Spirit, but as the Father proceeds the Spirit while "in the bosom of the Son" the Spirit is contemplated to be "through the Son", but the Son doesn't expirate the Spirit (only the Father). Nonetheless, Eriugena believes that the Latin Fathers may have had a good reason to incorporate the "filioque" clause into the Creed, although he does not pretend to know what that reason was. The 12th century monk, William of Malmesbury, says that Eriugena was "a follower of the Greeks" and that "he introduced into his books much that is unacceptable to the ears of the Latins...".

==== Intersubjectivity ====
Moran refers to the communicating intelligences (i.e., the human merged with and in God) within Eriugena's theological schema as constituting an "intersubjective" domain of circular figuration which Eriugena inherits from Boethius: "Eriugena does not have a modern understanding of the self-enclosed isolated subject. Rather, he has the idea of a nous which as a 'circular' motion around God, and can come into a unity with Him." Likewise, Boethius’ description in the Consolation notes that the relation between Providence and Fate is as a set of concentric orbits around an axis, with Providence as the unmoved axis itself and Fate as occupying the outermost orbits, which must traverse ever longer distances around that center. For both Eriugena and Boethius, to the degree to which a soul can infuse itself with the Godhead, which is the omnipresent center, it can also be absorbed in its undivided, non-dual nature, and cease to experience the distension of being torn in multiple directions thus attaining beatitude.

Additionally, Moran argues that the notion of intersubjectivity is in Eriugena's philosophy, and it is "anti-hierarchical, bubble-like". Eriugena writes of a communion that occurs in the mind through intellectual penetration such that whenever the intellect knows something perfectly, it is "made in that thing and becomes one with it." Eriugena explication of his cosmological schema reveals how the traditional hierarchy of angels placed above the human is uniquely transfigured by Christian revelation and folded through the soul's proximity to the divine:

If you look more closely into the mutual relation and unity which exist between intelligible and rational natures, you will at once find that not only is the angelic nature established in the human but also the human is established in the angelic. For it is created in everything of which the pure intellect has the most perfect knowledge and becomes one with it. So closely indeed were the human and angelic natures associated, and so they would be now if the first man had not sinned, that the two would have become one. Even as it is this is beginning to happen in the case of the highest men, from whom are the firstborn among the celestial natures. Moreover the angel is made in man, through the understanding of angel which is in man, and man is in the angel through the understanding of man which is established in the angel. For, as I have said, he who has a pure understanding is created in that which he understands. So the intelligible and rational nature of the angel is created in the intelligible and rational nature of man, just as the nature of man is created in the nature of angel, through the mutual knowledge by which angel understands man and man angel.

Becoming-other through mutual embrace or absorption represents a medieval complication of the purely top-down hierarchies often representative of classical Neoplatonism. They are complicated insofar as, at one level of structure the hierarchy remains, but at another level, it is transcended and included in a wider notion of a single divine-self (i.e., network-refraction). A later medieval concordance is found with St. Thomas Aquinas, who in the thirteenth century wrote that, when a spiritual entity exists fully and completely in something, it contains that thing and is not contained by it. Gardiner notes how that is similar to Object-Orientated-Ontology, that in the relationship of knowing, a subject is brought into contact with an Other outside of the self, not in the interior of that Other, but rather in the interior of the relationship-with-that-Other-as-object.

==== Learned ignorance ====
In Eriugena's De Divisione Naturae, the most excellent part of our nature as moving is nous, and as essence it is οὐσία. All emanation or "division," and all return or "analysis" begins and ends in οὐσία. It is known only in this exitus-reditus process; immediately it is knowable neither generically nor in particulars. According to Wayne J. Hankey, the ambiguity that was in Boethius is absent from Eriugena, who is far more confident in his trinitarianism: οὐσία names the One, the Godhead shared between persons. The Divine "nothingness by excellence" is "beyond all things which are and which are not". By plunging into this divine nature, which is said not to be, "because of its ineffable excellence and incomprehensible infinity”, Eriugena follows Pseudo-Dionysius's apophaticism into its extremes towards "the ineffable and incomprehensible and inaccessible brilliance of the divine goodness, unknown to any intellect", and so beyond the activity of intellect. The mystical attainment of this ascent to God is through a learning of ignorance; a trained effort towards going beyond discursive thought. According to Trouillard, learned ignorance is essential to human dignity and its cosmic role:

God does not know himself. And the reason for this ignorance, is that God is nothing… God… remains… inaccessible to all thought and is communicable only as motion. Therefore we distinguish in God, so to speak, two levels: that of the Deity, which is an irremediably obscure centre, and that of God the Creator, who, by the rays which he projects, makes himself known through his creatures… Our spirit is in itself a silent spontaneity and, nonetheless, manifests itself to the outside and to itself by signs and figures… Because it is in the image of God our mind is nothingness, and this is why it expresses the totality of the universe. Becoming the meanings which it emits, it creates itself in them, and nevertheless however refuses to define itself by its own creations.

God is intimately woven to the human as the human is to Divinity. Eriugena came to understand human nature as more than being, "that in which all things could be found," but rather became; “that in which all things are created.” The human is the workshop of creation; as the imago Dei, the human is the image of the creator. It is the medium in which God knows and creates himself out of his own unknowing nothingness, precisely because, uniquely among beings, the human possesses all the forms of knowing and ignorance, including sensation. Donald Duclow explains the indissoluble marriage between the two:

Eriugena places the human being among the primordial causes within the divine Word. He further describes humanity as created in God's image and likeness, with two basic features: (1) a self-ignorance whereby humanity knows only that it is, not what it is; and (2) a self-knowledge that embraces all creation, visible and invisible. In the first, the human being reflects God's unknowable transcendence. In the second, the human being becomes – in Maximus's phrase – “the workshop of all things, officina omnium,” and faithfully mirrors God's creative Wisdom. Simultaneously transcending and embracing the whole created order, humanity thus becomes a precise image of its divine exemplar.

This is why Eriugena, while being a master of the dialectic of a Greek Rationalist flavour, is able to paradoxically "praise ignorance more than knowledge". It is precisely this kicking away of discursive multiplicity which can only gesture towards but never fully capture God that accords better to God:

For the human mind does know itself, and again does not know itself. For it knows that it is, but does not know what it is. And as we have taught in the earlier books it is this which reveals most clearly the Image of God to be in man. For just as God is comprehensible in the sense that it can be deduced from His creation that he is, and incomprehensible because it cannot be comprehended by any intellect whether human or angelic nor even by Himself what He is, seeing that He is not a thing but is superessential: so to the human mind it is given to know one thing only, that it is – but as to what it is, no sort of notion is permitted; and, a fact which is stranger still and, to those who study God and man, more fair to contemplate, the human mind is more honoured in its ignorance than in its knowledge; for the ignorance in it of what it is is more praiseworthy than the knowledge that it is, just as the negation of God accords better with the praise of His Nature than the affirmation, and it shows greater wisdom not to know than to know that Nature of Which ignorance is the true wisdom and Which is known all the better for not being known. Therefore the Divine Likeness in the human mind is most clearly discerned when it is only known that it is, and not known what it is; and, if I may so put it, what it is, is denied in it, and only that it is, is affirmed. Nor is this unreasonable. For if it were known to be something, then at once it would be limited by some definition, and thereby would cease to be a complete expression of the Image of its Creator, Who is absolutely unlimited and contained within no definition, because He is infinite, beyond all that may be said or comprehended, superessential.

==== Alleged pantheism ====
De Divisione Naturae was condemned by a council at Sens by Honorius III (1225), for appearing to promote the identity of God and creation, and by Gregory XIII in 1585. According to Max Bernhard Weinstein, Eriugena argued on behalf of something like a panentheistic or panendeistic definition of nature. Lutheran theologian Otto Kirn severely criticised Weinstein, claiming sweeping generalisations and shallow assertions pertaining to Eriugena and other such Neoplatonic theologians. Eriugena maintained that for one to return to God, he must first go forth from Him and so Eriugena himself denied that he was a pantheist. Étienne Gilson also argued that Eriugena's alleged pantheism derived from a misunderstanding of the nature of "division" in the Periphyseon. Gilson writes that when we read Eriugena, "nature" is not meant as a totality of which God and creatures are parts; or as a genus of which God and creatures would be species. God is not all things, nor are all things God and Eriugena explicitly tells us that such a conception is a monstrosity. The division of nature signifies the act by which God expresses himself in hierarchical declension, and makes himself known in a hierarchy of beings which are other than, and inferior to, him by being lesser grades of reality; "yet, in point of fact, Erigena only means that each and every creature is essentially a manifestation, under the form of being, of what is above being. The esse of a being is but a light radiated by the superesse, which is God."

Historian of philosophy Frederick Copleston summarized the matter thus:

If one takes a particular set of isolated statements of John Scotus one would have to say that he was either a pantheist or a theist. For example, the statement that the distinction between the second and third stages of Nature is due only to the forms of human reasoning is in itself clearly pantheistic, while the statement that the substantial distinction between God and creatures is always preserved is clearly theistic. It might seem that we should opt for one or the other set in an unqualified manner, and it is this attitude which has given rise to the notion that John Scotus was a conscious pantheist who made verbal concessions to orthodoxy with his tongue in his cheek. But if one realises that he was a sincere Christian, who yet attempted to reconcile Christian teaching with a predominantly neo-Platonic philosophy or rather to express the Christian wisdom in the only framework of thought which was then at hand, which happened to be predominantly neo-Platonic one should also be able to realise that, in spite of the tensions involved and the tendency to rationalise Christian dogma, as far as the subjective standpoint of the philosopher [i.e., of John Scotus] was concerned a satisfactory reconciliation was effected.

==== Apocatastasis ====
Pierre Batiffol wrote that Eriugena is believed to have held to a form of apocatastasis or universal reconciliation, which maintains that the universe will eventually be restored under God's dominion. His form of apocatastasis however is unique. It is not Christian Universalism, but rather part of a broader Neoplatonic eschatology. As the cosmos for Eriugena gradually unfolds the grades of reality from the Godhead, so too will the various grades enfold into each other in a cosmic return to God, of which the Incarnation of Christ is a necessary tool for such a reversion. After the resurrection, the division between the sexes shall be abolished and elevated man will be as the fall had never happened for the elect. The body of each person will return to the soul from which it was separated such that, "life will become sense; sense will become reason and reason will become pure thought. A fourth stage will return the human soul to its primary cause or Idea and, together with the soul, the body it has reabsorbed...The fifth and last moment of this universal "analysis" will bring the terrestrial sphere back to Paradise. As this movement will propagate itself from sphere to sphere, nature and all its causes will let themselves be progressively permeated by God as air is by light. From that time and on, there will be nought else but God."

However for Eriugena, this deification does not result in annihilation, because he believes that things are more real in their primordial causes than in themselves, and as such he evades the Origenistic apocatastasis whereby the lower grades of reality are annihilated. So, while everything has indeed returned to God in Eriugena's account, material hell is a "pagan superstition", eternal punishment remains as "the supernatural distinction between the chosen and the condemned will remain whole and will persist eternally, but each one will be beatified or punished in his own conscience."

== Influence ==
Eriugena's work is distinguished by the freedom of his speculation, and the boldness with which he works out his logical or dialectical system of the universe. He marks a stage of transition from ancient philosophy to the later scholasticism. For him, philosophy is not in the service of theology. His assertion that philosophy and religion are fundamentally one and the same is repeated almost word for word by many of the later scholastic writers, but its significance depends upon the selection of one or other term of the identity as fundamental or primary. For Eriugena, philosophy or reason is first or primitive; authority or religion is secondary, derived. Eriugena's influence was greater with mystics, especially Benedictines, than with logicians, but he was responsible for a revival of philosophical thought which had remained largely dormant in western Europe after the death of Boethius.

Eriugena is generally classified as a neoplatonist, though was not influenced directly by such philosophers as Plotinus or Iamblichus. Jean Trouillard stated that, although he was almost exclusively dependent on Christian theological texts and the Christian Canon, Eriugena, "reinvented the greater part of the theses of Neoplatonism."

=== St. Bernard of Clairvaux ===
Within the twelfth-century Cistercian Order, alongside William of Saint-Thierry, St. Bernard of Clairvaux's mystical theology was greatly influenced by the work of Eriugena. His influence came to Bernard through two principal texts;

- i) Eriugena's translation of St. Maximus the Confessor.
- ii) De Divisione Naturae itself.

From both St. Maximus and Eriugena he borrows the Dionysian concept of excessus and a milder version of Eriugena's Neoplatonic reversion and procession but blending it further with the Johannine account of God as Love.

All things move towards God as towards the motionless Sovereign Good. The end of their movement, which is also their own proper good, is to attain this motionless Good. Natural things tend to Him in virtue of their very nature; intelligent beings by way of knowledge and love. Hence the ecstatic movement which bears them on towards Him... the effect of this excessus is to make him who loves fiat totum in toto amato (op. cit., 1 202 A), in such a way that there now remains nothing for him to will of his own will. Circumscribed by God on all sides, he is as air flooded with light, or as iron liquefied in the fire. And like Eriugena, the liquefaction and fusion of the soul in ecstasy does not involve its annihilation, but rather keeps the soul's essence perfectly intact and perfects it further.

=== St. Hildegard von Bingen ===
St. Hildegard's Ordo Virtutum and Scivias express much of an influence from Eriugena. Following in the Irish theologian's footsteps, Hildegard boldly admits the possibility of an individual who is raised above the angel, implying an intersubjective contact within the Godhead. In this unique medieval interpretation of the ontological scale, the Platonic mean serves not as a lower reflection but as a type of interface linking divine and sublunary worlds within the mind of its user. A common theme which she borrows from him also is the notion of cosmological, top-down hierarchies that both contain, and are transcended by, the human as Imago Dei. Hildegard also follows Eriugena on his account of intersubjectivity as well as his view of the soul's return through the cosmos to God.

The networked centricities in the Ordo allow distant tonalities to be drawn close, collapsing linear progressions into folded, synoptic structures. In this way, Eriugena's intersubjective proximity through spherical absorption... becomes one of the organizing principles of the Ordo Virtutum as a whole, and its expression of what we might today call the phenomenological aspects of a spiritual pilgrimage, the soul's navigatio through the chaos of the world, its re-ordering, and return to the One, i.e., the celestial city Ordo Virtutum 86 (celestem Ierusalem).

=== Nicholas of Cusa ===
As Catà argues, the philosophical relationship between John Eriugena and dialectician Nicholas of Cusa, connecting directly two different thinkers through six centuries, is a fundamental moment in the history of Christian Neoplatonism. Cusanus is the most significant interpreter of Eriugena's thought, between Eckhart and the German Idealism. "The strong influence of the Irish philosopher on Cusanus’ work is decisive. The idea of God as the infinite One wherein all beings are contained; and the conception of the universe as a self-creation of God, elaborated by Eriugena, constitute the fulcrum of Cusanus’ metaphysical system."

=== Modern philosophy ===
On the whole, one might be surprised that even in the seventeenth-century pantheism did not gain a complete victory over theism; for the most original, finest, and most thorough European expositions of it (none of them, of course, will bear comparison with the Upanishads of the Vedas) all came to light at that period, namely through Bruno, Malebranche, Spinoza, and Scotus Erigena. After Scotus Erigena had been lost and forgotten for many centuries, he was again discovered at Oxford and in 1681, thus four years after Spinoza's death, his work first saw the light in print. This seems to prove that the insight of individuals cannot make itself felt so long as the spirit of the age is not ripe to receive it. On the other hand, in our day (1851) pantheism, although presented only in Schelling's eclectic and confused revival thereof, has become the dominant mode of thought of scholars and even of educated people. This is because Kant had preceded it with his overthrow of theistic dogmatism and had cleared the way for it, whereby the spirit of the age was ready for it, just as a ploughed field is ready for the seed.

— Schopenhauer, Parerga and Paralipomena, Vol. I, "Sketch of a History of the Doctrine of the Ideal and the Real".

Leszek Kołakowski, a Polish Marx scholar, has mentioned Eriugena as one of the primary influences on Hegel's, and therefore Marx's, dialectical form. In particular, he called De Divisione Naturae a prototype of Hegel's Phenomenology of Spirit. Eriugena's systematic earned the reputation as the "Hegel of the ninth century," among German Hegelian scholars.

== Legacy ==
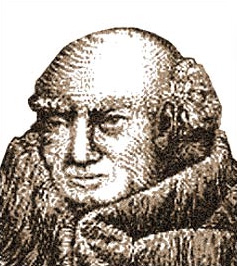
Scotus on the £5 note

Eriugena gives his name to the John Scottus School in Dublin. John Scotus also appeared on the Series B £5 note, in use between 1976 and 1992.

Bertrand Russell called him "the most astonishing person of the ninth century". The Stanford Encyclopedia of Philosophy states he "is the most significant Irish intellectual of the early monastic period. He is generally recognized to be both the outstanding philosopher (in terms of originality) of the Carolingian era and of the whole period of Latin philosophy stretching from Boethius to Anselm".

=== William of Malmesbury ===
William of Malmesbury's humorous anecdote illustrates both the character of Eriugena and the position he occupied at the French court. The king having asked, Quid distat inter sottum et Scottum? (What separates a sot [drunkard] from an Irishman?), Eriugena replied, Tabula tantum (Only a Table).

William of Malmesbury is not considered a reliable source on John Scotus Eriugena by modern scholars. For example, his reports that Eriugena is buried at Malmesbury is doubted by scholars who say that William confused John Eriugena with a different monk named John. William's report on the manner of Eriugena's death, killed by the pens of his students, also appears to be a legend. "It seems certain that this is due to confusion with another John and that the manner of John's death is borrowed from the Acts of St. Cassian of Imola. Feast: (at Malmesbury), 28 January."

== Works ==
=== Translations ===
- Johannis Scotti Eriugenae Periphyseon: (De Divisione Naturae), 3 vols, edited by I. P. Sheldon-Williams, (Dublin: Dublin Institute for Advanced Studies, 1968–1981) [the Latin and English text of Books 1–3 of De Divisione Naturae]
- Periphyseon (The Division of Nature), tr. I. P. Sheldon-Williams and JJ O'Meara, (Montreal: Bellarmin, 1987) [The Latin text is published in É. Jeauneau, ed, CCCM 161–165.]
- The Voice of the Eagle. The Heart of Celtic Christianity: John Scotus Eriugena's Homily on the Prologue to the Gospel of St. John, translated and introduced by Christopher Bamford, (Hudson, NY: Lindisfarne; Edinburgh: Floris, 1990) [reprinted Great Barrington, MA: Lindisfarne, 2000] [translation of Homilia in prologum Sancti Evangelii secundum Joannem]
- Iohannis Scotti Eriugenae Periphyseon (De divisione naturae), edited by Édouard A. Jeauneau; translated into English by John J. O'Meara and I.P. Sheldon-Williams, (Dublin: School of Celtic Studies, Dublin Institute for Advanced Studies, 1995) [the Latin and English text of Book 4 of De divisione naturae]
- Glossae divinae historiae: the Biblical glosses of John Scottus Eriugena, edited by John J. Contreni and Pádraig P. Ó Néill, (Firenze: SISMEL Edizioni del Galluzzo, 1997)
- Treatise on divine predestination, translated by Mary Brennan, (Notre Dame, IN: University of Notre Dame Press, 1998) [translation of De divina praedestinatione liber.]
- A Thirteenth-Century Textbook of Mystical Theology at the University of Paris: the Mystical Theology of Dionysius the Areopagite in Eriugena's Latin Translation, with the Scholia translated by Anastasius the Librarian, and Excerpts from Eriugena's Periphyseon, translated and introduced by L. Michael Harrington, Dallas medieval texts and translations 4, (Paris; Dudley, MA: Peeters, 2004)
- Paul Rorem, Eriugena's Commentary on the Dionysian Celestial Hierarchy, (Toronto: Pontifical Institute of Mediaeval Studies, 2005). [The Latin text is published in Expositiones in Ierarchiam coelestem Iohannis Scoti Eriugenae, ed J. Barbet, CCCM 31, (1975).]
- Iohannis Scotti Erivgenae: Carmina, edited by Michael W. Herren, (Dublin: Dublin Institute for Advanced Studies, 1993)

== See also ==
- Dialectical theology
- Ignatian spirituality
- Mystical theology
- Neoplatonism
- Neoplatonism and Christianity
- Pseudo-Dionysius the Areopagite
