= Summer vacation =

School break

The terms summer vacation, summer break and summer holiday refer to a school break in the summer between school years and the break in the school academic year, where students are off anywhere between two weeks to three and a half months. Depending on the country and district, staff might be partially or fully excluded.

In the United States, Spain, Portugal, United Arab Emirates, Kuwait, Ireland, Italy, Greece, Georgia, Lithuania, Latvia, Romania, Ukraine, Russia, and Vietnam, summer vacation generally lasts for the three months. In Australia, Brazil, the United Kingdom, Pakistan, Bangladesh, Iraq, Saudi Arabia, India, the Netherlands, Germany and Mexico, summer vacation generally lasts for two to six weeks, but may sometimes last for three months.

== By country ==
=== Africa ===
==== Zimbabwe ====
School holidays occur once every three months for approximately 3 weeks and the new year begins in January.

=== The Americas ===
==== Bolivia ====
In Bolivia, summer vacation runs from early December to early February. (2 months).

==== Brazil ====
In Brazil, summer vacation is also between early December and early February.

==== Canada ====
Canada's summer vacation usually lasts from last week of June to early September.

==== Colombia ====
In Colombia, summer vacation varies. Colombia has an equatorial climate (see Climate of Colombia) and schools run two different calendars. Public schools and some private schools run "Calendar A" which has a short break from mid-June to early-July. Only some private schools run "Calendar B" in which there is a long vacation from mid or late-June to late-August or early-September. One of the reasons for private schools to run "Calendar B" is to adapt their calendar to match the calendars of international schools (of the Northern Hemisphere) for summer courses and academic exchanges.

==== Suriname ====
In Suriname, summer vacation usually starts in mid-August and ends in early-October. In 2012, a change of summer vacation was proposed by several legislators having summer vacation the same time as the Caribbean Community. The proposed plan is summer vacation starts from mid-June and ends in early-August.

==== United States ====
In the United States, depending on the region, summer break is approximately two to three months, with students typically finishing the school year in late May or early June and starting the new year in mid-late August or early September. About 4 percent of public schools in the U.S. use a balanced calendar that operates year-round with a shorter summer break.

The modern school calendar has its roots in 19th-century school-reform movements seeking standardization between urban and rural areas. Up until the mid-19th century, most schools were open for a winter and summer term. As individual schools merged into school districts and bureaucracies emerged to manage the newly formed school districts, school leaders and politicians identified a need to standardize calendars across regions. This standardization was related to the emerging tax structures, laws around compulsory education, as well as a general sentiment that school should be an essential component of American childhood.

As the calendar was standardized across regions, school leaders took signals from a variety of factors, including attendance rates and the difficulty cooling school buildings. Many upper-class families left the city for cooler climates in the northeast during hot summer months, and as such, schools cancelled their summer sessions due to low daily attendance. As train travel became more affordable, middle-class families followed similar patterns, keeping their children home during the hottest months of the year or going away for a summer vacation.

Additionally, many school leaders advocated for breaks so that students and teachers could rest their brains. Many 19th- and early 20th-century Americans educators believed that too much learning in hot weather was bad for one's health and could result in heat exhaustion and injury, particularly for younger children, whose minds were still developing. The extended summer break was seen as a way for children and their teachers to rest and recover. In many places, teachers would use the summer months for their own learning and professional development, including participating in seminars and courses like those held at Chautauqua.

While the origins of the summer holiday break are often believed to be rooted in agriculture and the idea children were needed to assist with planting and harvesting crops, this is inaccurate. Most crops were planted in the spring and harvested in the fall.

=== Asia ===
==== China ====
In China, summer vacation (aka summer holidays) usually starts in late June to mid-July (after the end of the school year) and ends around September 1 (the beginning of the new school year), lasting from one and a half to two and a half months.

==== India ====
In India, summer vacation lasts for around 1.5 – 2 months (6–8 weeks), the minimum time and span of dates of which the Government decides for the most part while private schools are allowed to extend them. Summer break/vacation time and length varies from region to region due to India's diverse climate. Typical summer vacation is from mid-late May to early July in the Northern states and from mid-April to the end of May or early June in the Southern States. In the northeastern state of Assam, summer vacation usually begins in the last week of June or first week of July. Schools reopen in the last week of July or first week of August and the winter vacation usually begins in first week of December.

==== Pakistan ====
In Pakistan, summer vacation lasts for around 1.5 – 2 months (6–8 weeks), the minimum time and span of dates of which the Government decides for the most part while private schools are allowed to extend them. Summer break/vacation time and length varies from region to region due to Pakistan's diverse climate. Typical summer vacation is from mid-late May to early July in the Northern states and from mid-April to the end of May or early June in the Pakistan. In the northeastern state of Karachi, summer vacation usually begins in the last week of June or first week of July. Schools reopen in the last week of July or first week of August and the winter vacation usually begins in first week of December.

==== Japan ====
In Japan, most businesses close for a few days in August around Obon, while schools close for around six weeks (usually the second half of July and all of August). As most schools in the country run between April and March of the following year, the summer vacation period actually takes place within the school year.

==== Philippines ====
Select universities have adapted the school year schedule of other countries, starting the school year in September and having the summer holidays from June to August. Some of the schools that complied are still in transition, their academic calendars still beginning in July, others in August, with their summer vacations adjusted accordingly.

Vietnam

In Vietnam, the summer vacation for school students typically lasts from late May or early June to late August. For university students, the vacation period is more flexible and depends on each institution's academic schedule.

=== Oceania ===
==== New Zealand ====
In New Zealand, the school holidays typically start in early to mid-December, and end in late January or early February, which is usually 6–8 weeks.

=== Europe ===
==== Belgium ====
The summer holidays for primary and secondary education in Flanders run from 1 July to 31 August. These are not always whole weeks. In Wallonia and French-speaking education, the summer holidays start in the second week of July, and lessons are also resumed in the last week of August. The school holidays in French-speaking education have been reformed from the 2022–2023 school year, in Flanders the two-month summer holiday will be maintained. At universities, colleges and education for social advancement, the holidays for students usually last a little longer. They start in the course of September, and the exams are already at the beginning of June. For companies and public administrations, the most popular period is the end of July - beginning of August, coinciding with the construction holiday. However, there is a tendency to keep shops, services and businesses open during the summer holidays, albeit with a more limited staffing. The employees and civil servants must then agree on a rotation to take vacation.

==== Croatia ====
In Croatia, school year finishes at 21 June, starting again on the first Monday of September, but if it is 1 or 2 September, then school year will start 7 days later. Until school year 2018./2019., school was over between 10 and 15 June, but with same starting date. Students of last year of secondary school finish school year between 21 and 26 May, but they have national exams during whole June, called "matura".

==== Czech Republic ====
In the Czech Republic, summer holiday begins on July 1 and ends on August 31 (2 months).

==== Germany ====
In the Federal Republic of Germany, school holidays are set by the 16 state governments and are mandatory for all schools in primary and secondary education. For the summer vacation in particular, the start and end dates are coordinated among states and somewhat rotate, so the local school year varies in length. This roster has been introduced in the 1970s to better distribute demand for hotel rooms and holiday homes throughout peak season.

The summer vacation lasts for six weeks and up to three days. It usually includes 1 August, which is the formal start date of the school year, but this will be close to the end for some states and close to the start for others. This amounts to about half of the total school holidays, which also include up to two weeks each in autumn, winter (around Christmas) and spring (around Easter).

==== Iceland ====
In Iceland, the duration of the summer vacation can vary from one school to another. Typically students start their summer vacation during the first week of June and return to school in the fourth week of August.

==== Ireland ====
In the Republic of Ireland, most secondary schools start summer holidays at the end of May or the start of June. However, Junior and Leaving Certificate exams will take place during June. Schools will usually open again at the end of August to the start of September. Primary schools in the Republic of Ireland are sixteen days longer, so they start their summer holiday at the end of June but do not return until the first week of September. Private schools follow the same pattern.

==== Italy ====
In Italy the summer holiday usually starts on the first half of June and ends on the first half of September for a total of about three months. The exact dates usually depend on region and year.

==== Netherlands ====
The summer holiday has existed in the Netherlands since at least 1830. The summer holiday takes place in the months of July, August and September, although it depends on the region in which one lives whether September is also part of the summer holiday period. In the Netherlands, students get six weeks of vacation; this also applies in the Caribbean Netherlands. The government has spread the holidays over three regions: the northern, central and southern Netherlands. There is a two-week difference between the start of the holiday in the first region and that in the last region. The summer holidays started in 2023, the Central Netherlands is the first region to be affected, on July 8 and the end date of the school holidays was August 27 for the South of the Netherlands. Universities will resume their activities at the end of August. In politics, the summer recess officially ends on Prinsjesdag, the third Tuesday in September. The heart of the summer holiday is the so-called construction holiday: three weeks at the end of July and the beginning of August. Many people travel to a tourist area during the summer holidays. Campsites and holiday homes are very popular; outside the Netherlands, France is the favorite destination.

==== Poland ====
In Poland, in most schools, classes begin on the first weekday of September and end on the nearest Friday after 20 June. If 1 September falls on a Friday or Saturday, classes start on the first Monday after 1 September.

==== Romania ====
In Romania, summer vacation usually starts in mid-June and ends on the second Sunday of September (3 months). Since 2022, though, the end date was moved to the first Sunday of September.

For the 8th grade, summer break starts a week earlier before everyone else, whereas for the 12th (day) and 13th grades (evening and reduced frequentation) it starts 2 weeks earlier. For students attending the technological branch of secondary education, as well as those attending vocational and post-secondary education (with a few exceptions), summer vacation starts 1–2 weeks after everyone else.

==== Slovakia ====
In Slovakia, the last day in school is usually 30 June and the first day in school after the vacation is usually 1 September.

==== Slovenia ====
In Slovenia, summer vacations are 9 weeks long. Last day in school is traditionally always on 24 June, with earlier end only in case if Saturday or Sunday comes on that day. And the day of school traditionally always starts on 1 September, or day or two later if it comes on Saturday or Sunday.

==== Spain ====
In Spain, the school year finishes in mid to late June and begins in early to mid-September.

==== Sweden ====
Depending on school district, the school year in Sweden finishes around 12-13 June and the next begins around 14-18 August, giving most students a summer break on 9-10 weeks. For most Swedish universities, the summer break tends to start in early June and end around 1 September, making it on average a two and half-month break.

==== Switzerland ====
In Switzerland, summer vacation varies in each canton. As an example, in Zürich, it lasts five weeks and between mid-July and mid-August. In Ticino, it lasts about ten weeks between late June and early September.

==== Turkey ====
In Turkey, the summer vacation typically begins in mid-June and lasts until mid-September. However, the exact start and end dates can vary depending on the level of education and the type of school. For elementary, middle, and high school students, summer vacation usually lasts about three months, while for university students, the duration may vary based on the academic calendar of the institution. Public schools generally start their summer break in the second week of June, but private schools may have slightly different schedules. For the most accurate information on the academic year and vacation periods, it's best to consult the specific school or educational institution the student attends.

== Reception ==
The research around the impact of summer vacation is mixed. "Summer learning loss" (or "summer slide") is the perceived loss of learning students experience due to interrupted education, but the exact consequences of extended breaks is unclear. Some research highlights that school holidays can be stressful periods for children from low-income families.

== See also ==
- Summer camp
- Summer school
- School holiday
- Academic term
- Dog days
