= Clonskeagh =

Suburb of Dublin, Ireland

Clonskeagh Cluain Sceach (Irish)
- Suburb
- Location in Ireland
- Coordinates: 53.308333°N 6.240278°W
- Country: Ireland
- Province: Leinster
- County: County Dublin
- Local government areas: Dublin City Council, Dún Laoghaire–Rathdown County Council

Population (2011)
  - Urban: 11,273
- Eircode routing key: D14
- Area code: 01 (+3531)

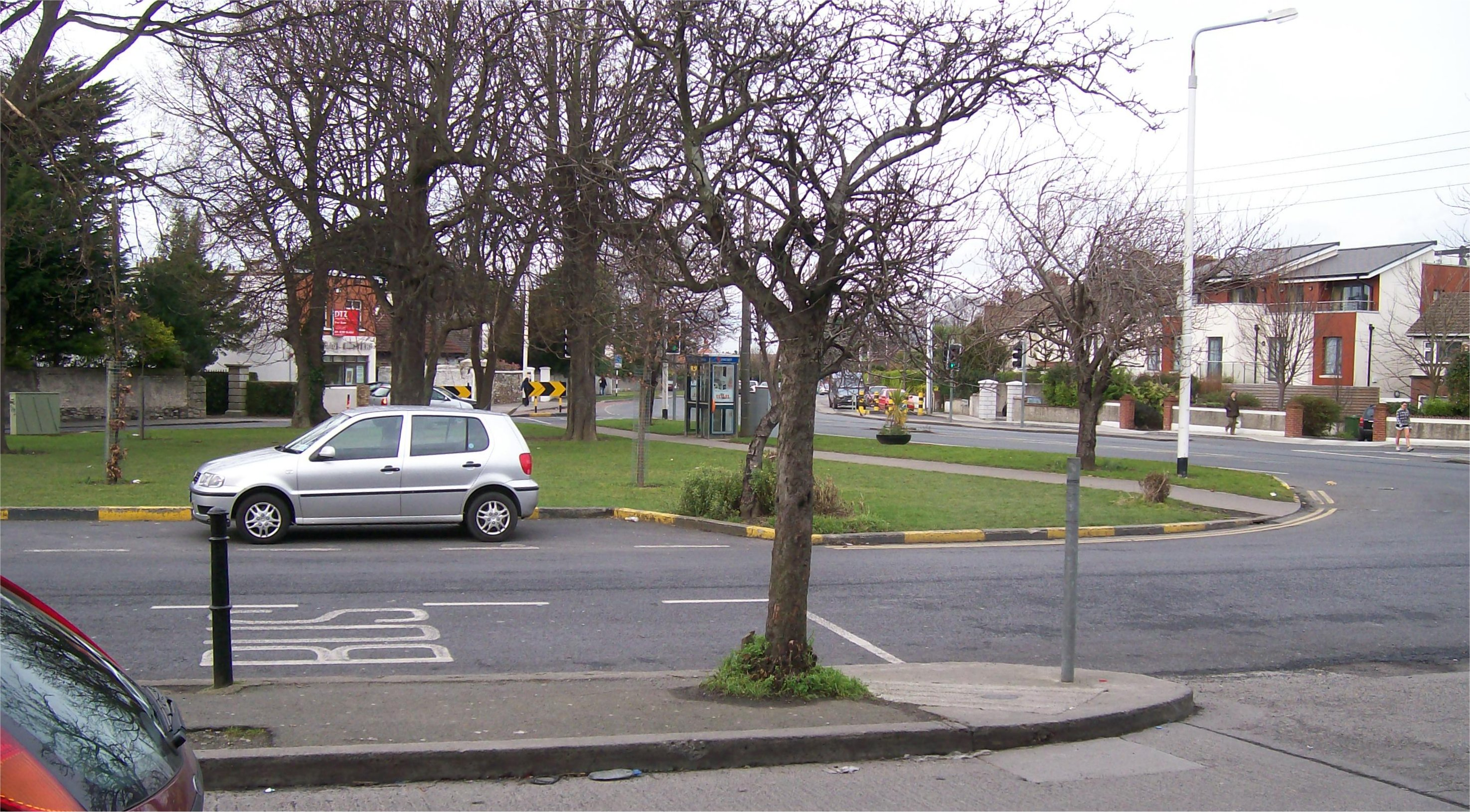
Clonskeagh Green

Clonskeagh or Clonskea (/klɒnˈskiː/; Irish: Cluain Sceach, meaning "meadow of the Whitethorn"), is a small suburb on the southside of Dublin, Ireland. The district straddles the River Dodder.

== Location and access ==
The district is adjacent to the River Dodder. The modern suburb lies partially within the jurisdiction of Dublin City Council but is mostly within the jurisdiction of Dún Laoghaire–Rathdown County Council. Roebuck Road defines the southernmost end of Clonskeagh; this area is sometimes known as Roebuck and occasionally considered to be part of Windy Arbour. The area is principally defined by the Clonskeagh Road and its extension into Roebuck Road, which spans its length. The northern end of the Clonskeagh Road at the junction with Eglinton Road / Milltown Road separates it from Ranelagh to the north, and the campus of University College Dublin at Belfield is to the east while Goatstown and Dundrum lie to the south. To the west is Windy Arbour, but there is no clear point at which that boundary might be defined.

Clonskeagh is a townland in the civil parish of Donnybrook in the traditional barony of Dublin.

== Character and development ==
Clonskeagh is primarily a residential area, developed in the early decades of the 20th century. It has a small village green with a few local shops. The district has changed in character as population growth in greater Dublin has imposed increasingly intensive use of land and the nearby Luas light railway has improved commuter access to central Dublin.

In the mid-1970s, Clonskeagh consisted of low-density housing with significant areas of private open land, largely owned by the Catholic Church. Since then, the closure of the Masonic Boys' School has led to commercial redevelopment north of Clonskeagh Road and former church land adjacent to Bird Avenue and Roebuck Road now has housing. Since 2000, housing development has intensified land use further by building in larger gardens, replacing houses by apartments and adding storeys to properties. This may be resisted by residents objecting to planning applications.

The Radiological Protection Institute of Ireland, which was established in 1992, is also based in Clonskeagh.

== Amenities ==
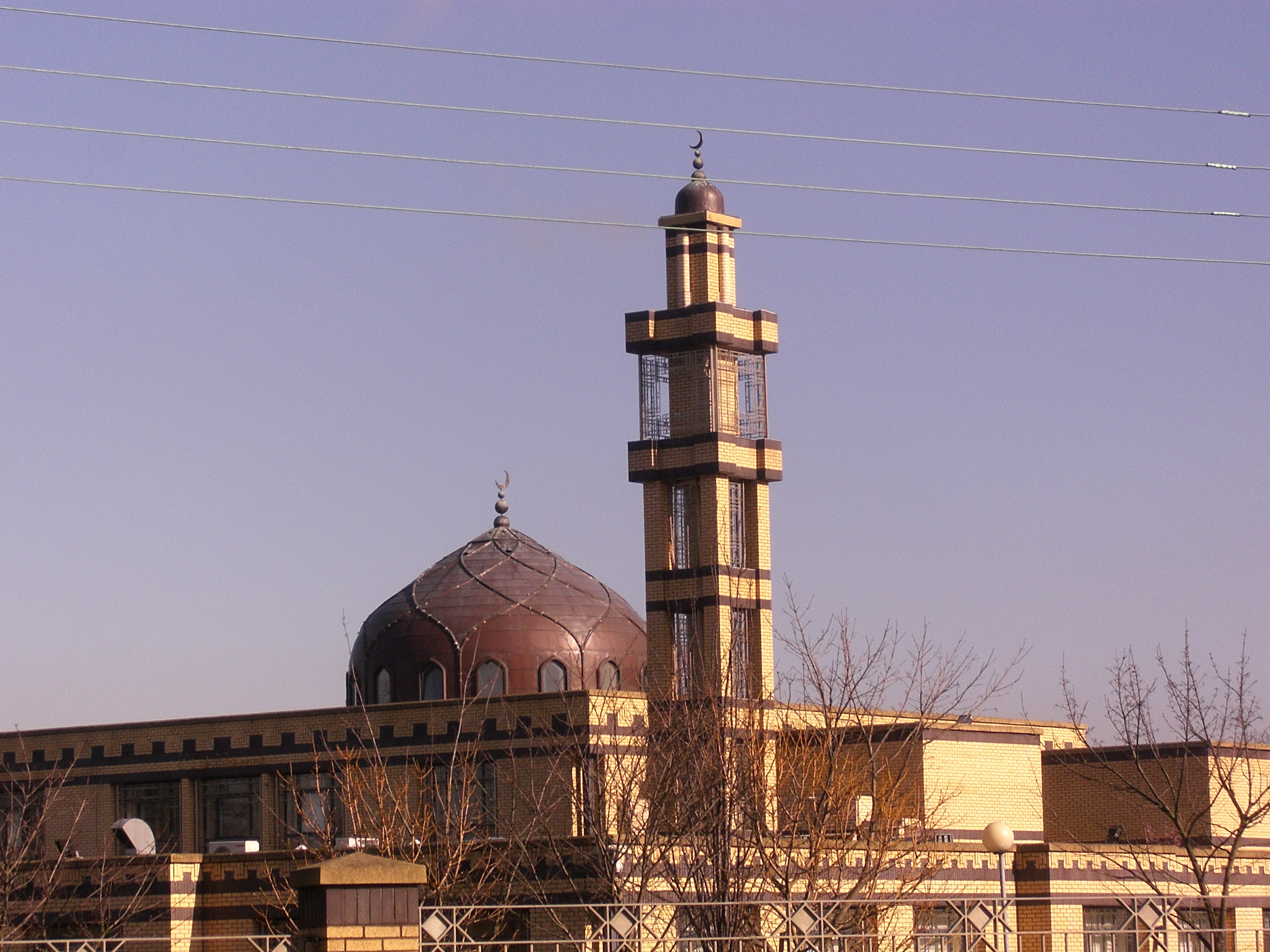
The Islamic Cultural Centre in Clonskeagh

There is a mid-20th century Catholic church on Bird Avenue, and the Islamic Cultural Centre of Ireland and its associated primary school are on Roebuck Road.

The former Vergemount Fever Hospital at Clonskeagh is now a nursing home facility for the elderly.

There are also several green spaces, as well as a large health and fitness club, and fishing takes place on the Dodder.

== Education ==
St. Kilians Deutsche Schule and the secondary campus of the Lycée Français d'Irlande share a "Eurocampus" in Roebuck Road, offering private schooling in a multicultural and multilingual environment, claimed to be unique to Ireland.

Ireland's first state-funded Muslim national school moved to Clonskeagh in 1993.

== Sport ==
The first-ever All-Ireland Senior Football Championship final was held in Beech Hill, Clonskeagh, one of the features of the area, on 29 April 1888, on the ground of St Benburb's Football Club.

== People ==
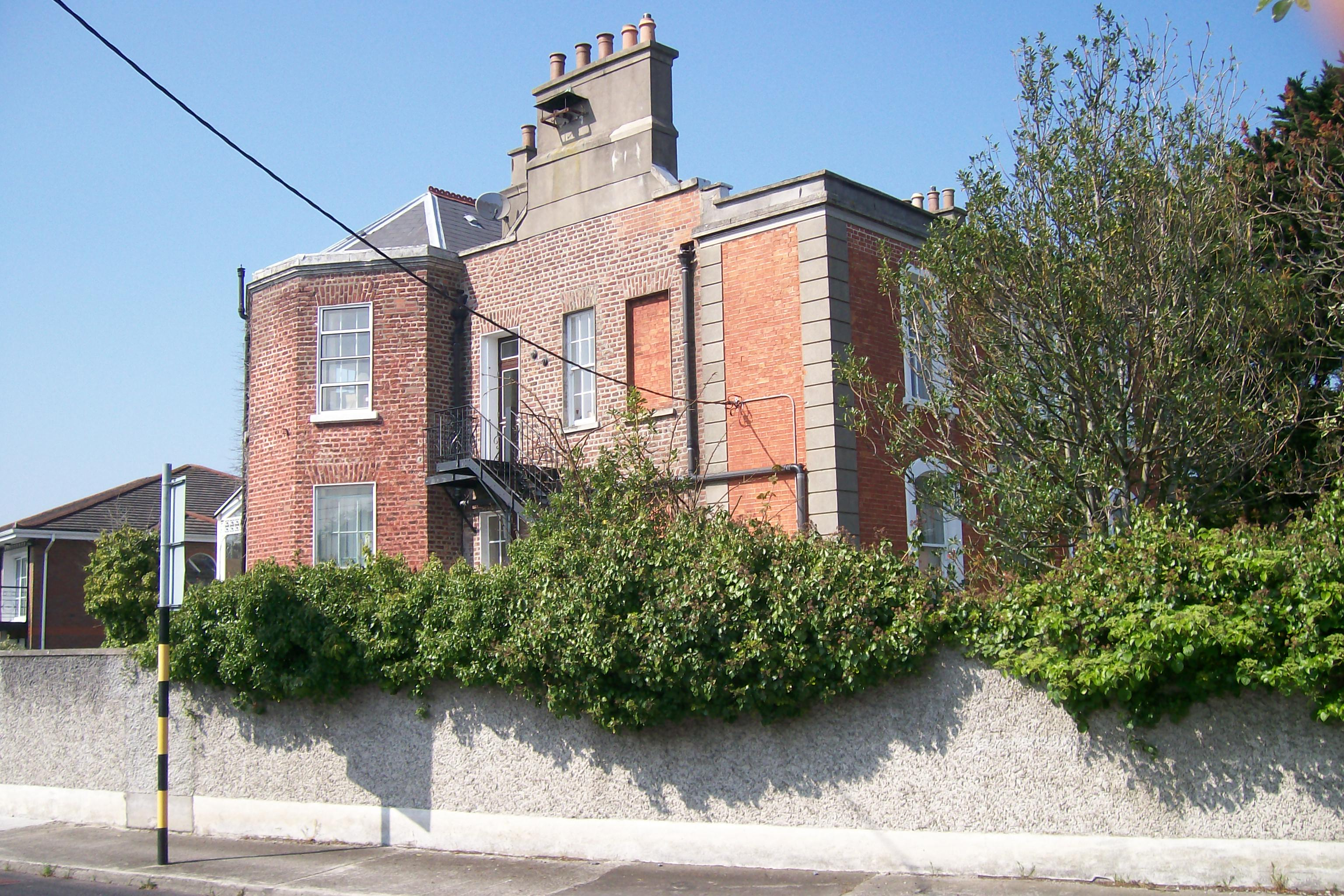
Roebuck House, Clonskeagh (note infill development behind old house)

- Isaac Butt, QC, MP, founder of the Irish Home Rule movement, lived in a cottage on the junction of Wynnsward Drive and the Clonskeagh Road.
- Mary Harney, former Minister for Health and Children and Tánaiste
- Seán MacBride, former Irish politician and Cabinet Minister, and his mother, Maud Gonne, lived at Roebuck House, near Clonskeagh Green.
- Chief Baron and Judge Christopher Palles was a resident after his retirement.
- Eamon Ryan, former Green Party leader, Minister for the Environment, Climate and Communications, Minister for Transport and Minister for Communications, Energy and Natural Resources

== See also ==
- List of towns and villages in Ireland
