= St Declan's School, Dublin =

St Declan's School

Location
- 35 Northumberland Road; Ballsbridge; Dublin 4 Republic of Ireland
- Coordinates: 53.335543°N 6.237881°W

Information
- School type: Special National School
- Denomination: Roman Catholic
- Patron saint: Saint Declán
- Established: 1958
- Founder: Society of Jesus
- Authority: Department of Education and Youth
- Principal: Annie Devine
- Language: English
- Website: StDeclans.ie

St Declan's School is a primary school in the Ballsbridge area of Dublin, close to the Aviva Stadium. It differs from other schools in the area because it was created by the Society of Jesus (with the Archbishop of Dublin), to offer specialised education for pupils with mild emotional and behavioural difficulties.

== History ==
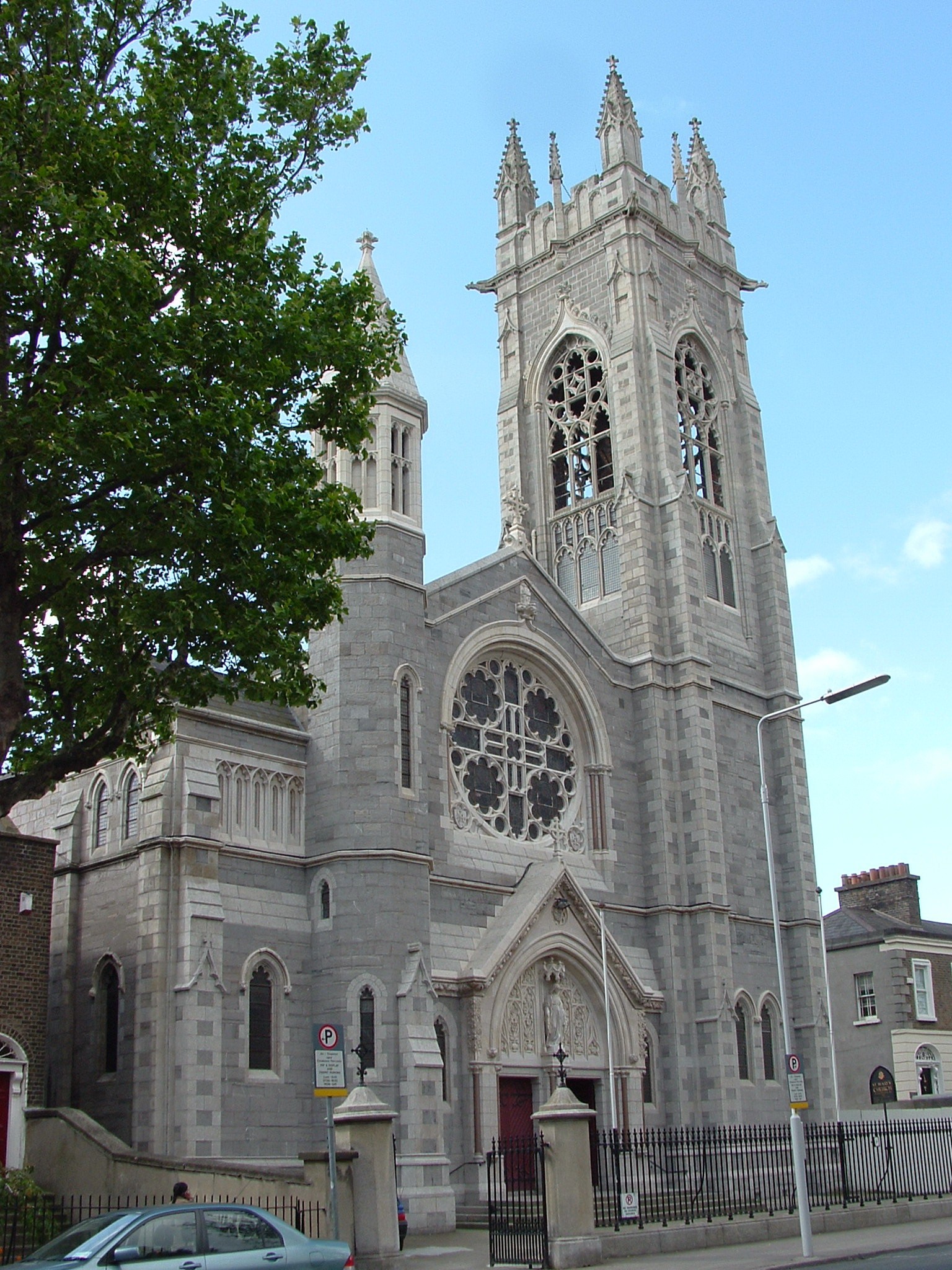
St Mary's Church where the school celebrated its jubilee in 2008

=== Foundation ===
In 1958, the Society of Jesus, in the person of the late Father Dermot Casey S.J., founded St Declan's as a school to teach boys and girls, of all denominations, who needed to reach their potential outside of the mainstream primary educational system.

=== Constitution ===
In 1959, the St Declan's Association, a group which supported the school, created the first constitution for the school, its aims for that the school would help children 'overcome their particular difficulties as quickly as possible so as to enable a speedy return to mainstream schools,' and that children would be taught 'at various levels within the same classroom, according to their individual abilities and needs.'

=== 21st century ===
In 2008, the school celebrated its fiftieth anniversary in the nearby St Mary's Church, the Mass was presided over by the Provincial of the Jesuits in Ireland.

As of 2012, the school has 48 pupils with a pupil to teacher ratio of 8 to 1.

== See also ==
- List of Jesuit sites in Ireland
- List of Jesuit schools
