= Greenhills College =

- Coláiste na gCnoc Glas

Location
- Limekiln Avenue, Dublin 12; Ireland; 53°18′27″N 6°20′08″W

Information
- Established: 1970
- Principal: Ann Bray
- Staff: 43
- Years offered: 6
- Gender: Boys
- Age: 12 to 18
- Enrollment: 600
- Colour: Navy
- Website: Official website

Greenhills College (Irish: Coláiste na gCnoc Glas) is a secondary school situated on Limekiln Avenue in Greenhills, County Dublin, Ireland. It accommodates Junior Certificate, Leaving Certificate and Leaving Certificate Applied students and offers the Leaving Certificate Vocational Programme to its students. It is run by the Dublin and Dun Laoghaire Education and Training Board (DDLETB) and is a non-fee paying school.

Greenhills College opened in 1970 in Crumlin, and moved to its present site in 1972. In 1973, Greenhills College offered adult education and leisure-type classes to the local community. The college also provides post-Leaving Certificate (PLC) and Vocational Training Opportunities Scheme (VTOS) courses for adult learners.

The school competes in a number of sports and extra curricular activities including Gaelic football, hurling, soccer, basketball, boxing, and Gaelic handball. Greenhills represented Ireland at the World Schools Games in Sweden in 1991. In 2015, the school won its first title in hurling. The Olympic Gold medallist and boxer, Michael Carruth, is a former student of Greenhills College which he attended with his two brothers.

== Curriculum ==
The curriculum offered covers a number of common subjects in the state examinations including German, Art, Music, Business, Engineering, Materials Technology Wood, Construction, Metalwork, Religious Education, Science and History.

In addition to the Leaving Certificate Vocational Programme (a voluntary programme run in the college), a number of subjects are taught at the school in both the Junior Certificate and Leaving Certificate cycles.

== Extra curricular activities ==
=== Sports ===
Gaelic football, hurling, soccer and basketball teams are the main team sports played at Greenhills College. The school has won Ireland's the national soccer title, the Dr. Tony O' Neill cup, in both 1980/81 and 1990/91, and went on to represent Ireland in the 1991 World Schools Cup in Sweden.

- Dr. Tony O' Neill Cup (Leinster Under 19 A) (2): 1980/81, 1990/91
- John Murphy Cup (Leinster Under 19 B) (1): 2010/11
- Tom Ticher Cup (Leinster Under 17 A) (4): 1983/84, 1985/86, 1989/90, 1994/95
- Minor Cup (Leinster Under 15 A) (6): 1980/81, 1981/82, 1984/85, 1987/88, 1992/93, 1995/96

=== Clubs and events ===
The college has a number of clubs and societies including a student council, enterprise club, ECO club and a cooking club.

Each March, Seachtain na Gaeilge (literally, "Week of Irish") events are organised to promote the Irish language in the school. An annual Mind Your Mind event has also been held since 2016.

== Facilities ==
The college has three science laboratories, two art classrooms, two woodwork classrooms, two engineering classrooms, five computer rooms, a technical graphics rooms and over 40 classrooms. Greenhills College has a separate P.E. hall and gymnasium on the school grounds.

== Adult education ==
Greenhills College of Further Education runs full and part-time PLC qualifications in Business, Computing, Engineering, Healthcare, Sports, Art, Pre-university Arts and VTOS courses. The courses take place in the further education section of the college.

Some of the adult education courses are FETAC accredited.

== Notable alumni ==
- Paul Bealin, former Dublin GAA footballer and winner of the 1995 All-Ireland Senior Football Championship
- Liam Buckley, association footballer and manager
- Mark Byrne, association footballer
- Michael Carruth, Irish Olympic boxer and Olympic gold medalist
- Stephen Gleeson, association footballer
- Jacknife Lee, Grammy award-winning record producer and musician
- Paul Newe, former association professional footballer
- Niall O'Toole, Irish Olympic rower and world gold medalist
- Gary Thomson, a former cyclist who competed in the individual road race and the team time trial events at the 1984 Summer Olympics.
- Mark Yeates, association footballer
