= Tralee Warriors =

Irish basketball club

- Leagues: Super League
- Founded: 2016
- Arena: MTU Tralee; Castleisland Community Centre
- Location: Tralee, Ireland
- Team colours: Green, blue, white
- Main sponsor: Garvey's Supervalu Tralee
- Championships: 2 (2019, 2022)

Tralee Warriors Basketball Club, also known as Garvey's Tralee Warriors for sponsorship reasons, is an Irish basketball club based in Tralee that hosts a men's team in the Super League. Their home arena is MTU Tralee and Castleisland Community Centre.

== History ==
In May 2016, a new Tralee basketball team was inducted into the Super League for the 2016–17 season. The team came about after a collaboration between local clubs Tralee Imperials and St Brendan's. Tralee's return to National League basketball, having previously hosted a team called Tralee Tigers, brought with it one of Ireland's best known basketball players, Kieran Donaghy. Donaghy, a dual Gaelic footballer and basketball player, played for St Brendan's in 2015–16 and was a big part of Tralee Tigers in the early 2000s. Originally set up as Tralee Town BC, the club was officially named Tralee Warriors Basketball Club, with their crest and colours being launched in July 2016.

On 23 September 2016, Tralee Warriors made their debut in the Super League with a 92–77 loss to UCC Demons. On 2 April 2017, Tralee Warriors were crowned Champions Trophy winners after defeating league champions Templeogue in the final. Tralee were led by American guard Trae Pemberton (21 points, 9 rebounds), Serbian forward Goran Pantovic (15 points, 18 rebounds), and game MVP Kieran Donaghy (15 points, 16 rebounds, 8 assists). For the season, Pemberton was named Men's Super League Player of the Year, Ryan Leonard was named Men's Super League Young Player of the Year, and Head Coach Mark Bernsen made it a Kerry treble by scooping the Men's Super League Coach of the Year.

In March 2018, Tralee Warriors returned to the Champions Trophy final, where they defended their title with a 73–61 win over Templeogue. Guard Paul Dick was named MVP of the final after scoring 22 points.

In March 2019, Tralee Warriors were crowned champions of the Super League for the first time, as they finished on top of the table with a league-best 16–4 record.

In January 2022, Tralee Warriors won the Irish National Cup with an 88–75 win over Neptune in the final. Forward Daniel Jokubaitis was named MVP of the final after scoring 19 points. They went on to win the League championship in April with a 78–72 victory over Neptune in the playoff final. Guard Aaron Calixte was named MVP of the final after scoring 21 points.

== Honours ==
Super League

- Champions (2): 2019, 2022

Irish National Cup

- Champions (1): 2022
