= John Scottus School =

Private primary and secondary school in Rathmichael, Dublin, Ireland

Location
- Old Conna House, Rathmichael and 47–49 Northumberland Road; A98 FN12; Ireland
- Coordinates: 53.2176°N 6.1381°W

Information
- Type: Primary and secondary
- Motto: Laetus Impraesens ("Delight in the Present")
- Established: 1986
- Trust: John Scottus Education Trust (JSET)
- Gender: Co-educational
- Age: 5 to 18
- Enrollment: c. 160 in primary, c. 200 in secondary (2025)
- Colour: Blue White
- Website: www.johnscottus.ie

John Scottus School is an independent, co-educational, fee-paying primary and secondary school in Dublin, Ireland. It is named after the 9th century philosopher and theologian John Scottus Eriugena.

== History ==
The schools are named after John Scottus Eriugena, the Platonist philosopher, theologian and poet of Early Medieval Ireland. The school ethos is influenced by Christian and Platonic philosophy. The schools were founded in 1986 to provide education in philosophical principles. It is under the patronage of the John Scottus Educational Trust. The first year that the school accepted students, four children were enrolled.

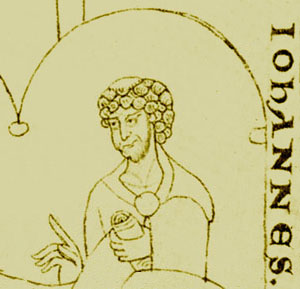
Johannes Scottus Eriugena- Philosopher and namesake of the school

== Curriculum ==
=== Primary ===
John Scottus primary school is a national mixed school. The school's curriculum teaches the standard primary curriculum with a focus on philosophy. Students practice meditation and learn Sanskrit, alongside traditional national curriculum subjects.

=== Secondary ===
John Scottus secondary school is a private fee paying school co-educational school. The secondary school curriculum includes subjects such as Latin, Classics and Greek alongside the more traditional Leaving Certificate curriculum. The school offers limited scholarships to sixth class students going into secondary school that cover up to half the fees for the Junior Certificate cycle.

== Facilities ==
The primary school is located on Northumberland Road, Dublin 4. In addition there is a second larger primary school along with a secondary based at Old Conna House, Rathmichael, County Dublin. The secondary school had previously been based in Donnybrook.

All schools are co-educational and cost approximately €6000 per year in tuition.
