= Moycullen Basketball Club =

- Founded: 1966
- Arena: Kingfisher, NUIG
- Location: Galway, Ireland
- Team colors: Green & white
- Website: MoycullenBasketball.net
Home	Away

Moycullen Basketball Club (also known as Maigh Cuilinn) is an Irish basketball club based in Moycullen, County Galway. The club was founded in 1966. The club's senior men's representative team has previously played in the Super League, Ireland's top basketball league.

The men's team first played in the Super League in 2009. In 2014, they dropped down to the second-tiered National League Division 1 and won the Division 1 title. They subsequently returned to the Super League for the 2015–16 season. Following the 2023–24 season, they stepped down to Division One.
