= Éanna Basketball Club =

- Founded: 2005
- Arena: Coláiste Éanna
- Location: Rathfarnham, Dublin, Ireland
- Team colors: Blue, white, red
- Main sponsor: Griffith College Dublin
- Championships: 1 (2024)
- Website: EannaBasketball.ie

Éanna Basketball Club is an Irish basketball club based in Dublin. The club's senior men's representative team, Griffith College Éanna, is currently a member of Ireland's top national league, the Super League.

== History ==
Éanna Basketball was established in 2005 by former Coláiste Éanna players.

In 2014, the club entered a senior men's team into the National League for the first time; the team placed third in its first season. In 2015, the team was elevated into the Premier League. In 2018, the team was demoted to Division One. After winning the National League Division One in 2018–19, the team was promoted back into the Super League.

In January 2020, the Super League team made it to the National Cup final, where they lost 78–68 to Templeogue. In January 2023, the Super League team returned to the National Cup final, where they lost 74–69 to Maree. They went on to finish on top of the Northern Conference ladder for the 2022–23 season before losing to Ballincollig in the quarter-finals.

In April 2024, the club won their first men's Super League championship with a 93–61 win over Killester in the final.
