= St Kilian's German School =

Independent international school in Clonskeagh, Dublin

- St Kilians Deutsche Schule
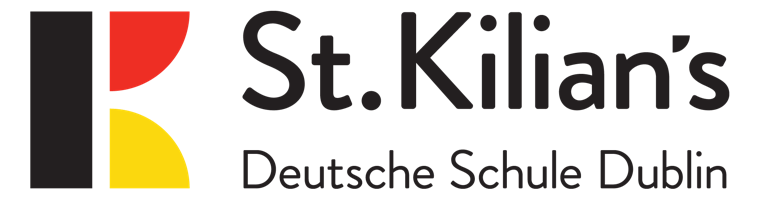

Location
- St Kilian’s German School, Eurocampus, Roebuck Road, Clonskeagh, D14 P7F2 Dublin, Ireland; Clonskeagh, Dublin; Ireland; 53.303406°N 6.229549°W

Information
- Type: Independent
- Motto: Fairness-courtesy-respect
- Established: 1952
- Principal: Anja Meier (Overall), Nigel MacMillan (Secondary School), Annette Black (Head of Primary and Kindergarten)
- Grades: Junior and Senior Infants, 1st-6th class, 1st-6th year
- Colour: red
- Website: School website

St Kilian's German School (Deutsche Schule Dublin) is a private German international school in Dublin, Ireland.

== Programme ==
St Kilian's is legally a single organisation, with a primary school, offering kindergarten (junior infants) and vorschule (senior infants) and main primary school (1st to 6th classes), and a secondary school. It is open to students from ages 4 to 18.

German is taught from the start, but is not required for entry. In primary school and secondary school, where relevant, input from the school programme of the German state of Baden-Württemberg is used. Depending on development of German language skills, pupils may have the option to pursue a German curriculum stream from 5th class. The school provides German language education beyond the level required by the Irish German curriculum, enabling pupils to take the German Sprachdiplom exams and qualify with the linguistic level required to enter German universities.

Some classes in the Junior Cycle (1st to 3rd years) are shared with the Lycée Français d'Irlande.

== History ==
St Kilian's was founded in the early 1950s, developing from the work of a Dublin charity, the Save the German Children Society, founded in 1945.

Since 2002, St Kilian's has shared sites with Lycée Français d'Irlande, the combined campus known as the "Eurocampus".

The secondary school has a typical rate of progression to third-level of 90-100%. In 2020 this reduced to 63%, following significant reduction in teacher-assigned grades, with even native German language speakers being graded H3 instead of school-assessed H1. The school and 9 pupils pursued High Court actions over this.

== Operations and funding ==
The school is operated by a company limited by guarantee, led by parents. It is part-funded by the German government.

== Notable alumni ==
- Charley Boorman - film actor and travelogue presenter
- Paul Murphy TD - Irish Socialist Party TD for the Dublin South-West Dáil constituency
