= Lycée Français International Samuel Beckett =

French international schools in Dublin, Ireland

Lycée français international Samuel Beckett

Location
- Preschool-Primary: Foxrock Avenue, Foxrock, Dublin 18; Secondary: Eurocampus Dublin, Roebuck Road, Clonskeagh, Dublin 14

Information
- Type: French international school
- Website: lfi.ie

The Lycée français international Samuel Beckett, formerly Lycée Français d'Irlande, is a French international school organisation in Dublin, Ireland. It has two units, a pre- and primary school division, covering from maternelle (preschool and infant classes) and elémentaire (junior classes), in a building on Foxrock Avenue in Foxrock, and a secondary school, comprising collège (junior cycle secondary) and lycée (senior cycle secondary), at the Eurocampus in Clonskeagh, shared with St. Kilian's Deutsche Schule, to which they moved in 2001.

== Educational project ==
Teaching is based entirely on the official French curriculum. The initial mission of the Lycée français international Samuel Beckett is to provide schooling for French-speaking students living permanently or temporarily in Ireland. A host family program is also offered for Lycée classes.

Today, the school's bilingual educational project attracts students of many nationalities. Another sign of the school's European openness is the special program of study visits set up in recent years. Each year, students from middle and high schools in France, Spain and other European countries are “guest students” at the Lycée for one or more school years. They stay with host families and prepare for English language certification (usually Cambridge) while continuing their studies.

Campuses

== Alumni ==
- Nicolas Roche - cyclist
