= Rockbrook Park School =

Private secondary school for boys, Rathfarnham, Dublin, Ireland

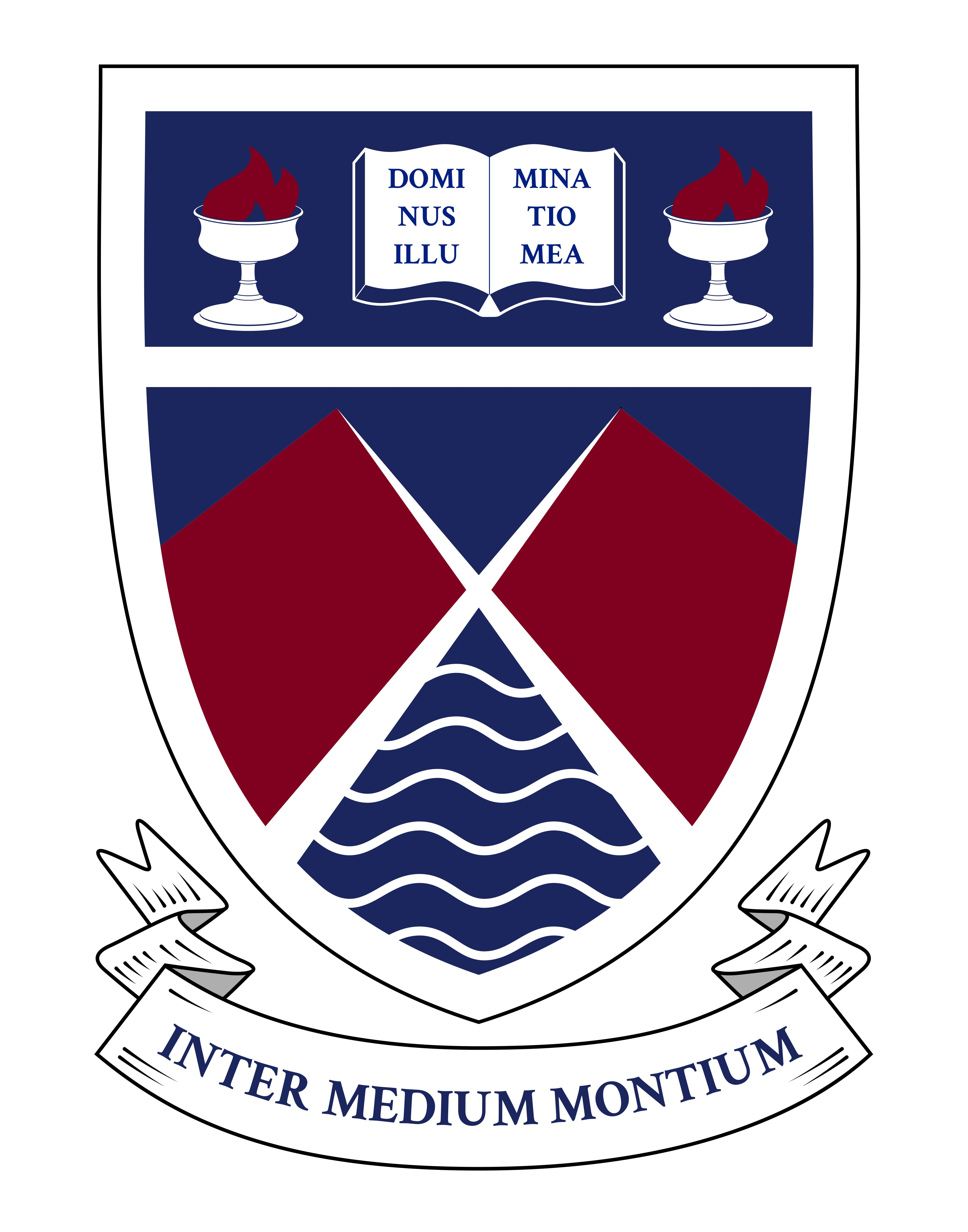

Location
- Rathfarnham, County Dublin; Ireland; 53.262775°N 6.30033°W

Information
- School type: fee-charging, secondary (or Middle & High school)
- Motto: Inter medium montem pertransibunt aquae Latin for "The river will always find a way through the mountains"
- Religious affiliations: Roman Catholic; Opus Dei
- Established: 1971
- Founder: Sean McDermott
- Chairperson: Dr. Máirtín Ó Droma
- Principal: Jude Mulligan
- Gender: Boys
- Age: 12-13 to 17-18
- Enrollment: 167 (2020)
- School fees: €4,240/year €5000 for all books and other resources
- Website: Official website

Rockbrook Park School is a fee-charging, secondary school for boys, located on Edmondstown Road, Rathfarnham, Dublin 16, Ireland. It was established by a group of parents, partly inspired by the work of the founder of Opus Dei.

== History ==
The school was founded in 1971, first as a "pre-university centre" at 144-116 St Stephen's Green, offering repeat Leaving Cert classes for students. In 1972, classes were expanded. Later, in 1975, the school moved to Rockbrook House and surrounding forty acres buying them from John Brown, who was retiring as chief brewer with Guinness and moving back to England. The price paid was £75,000 Irish pounds. In the summer of 1980, five classrooms and a number of small mentoring rooms were added at a cost of £44,000 Irish pounds.

In 2006-2008, Rockbrook built a new school building, car park, sports pavilion and two new soccer pitches costing €5 million.
