= Coláiste Éanna =

- Ballyroan, Rathfarnham; Ireland

Information
- Motto: Facere et docere (Latin for 'To do and to teach')
- Opened: 1967
- Principal: Seán Ó Murchú
- Faculty: 51
- Gender: Male
- Enrollment: 601
- Website: colaisteeanna.ie

Coláiste Éanna is a secondary school for boys under the trusteeship of the Edmund Rice Schools Trust in Ballyroan, Dublin, Ireland. It was founded in 1967 by the Congregation of Christian Brothers to serve the needs of the Ballyroan and adjacent parishes.

It is home to 601 pupils and a staff of 43 teachers and eight ancillary staff. The school is administered by a Board of Management appointed by the Edmund Rice Schools Trust. The Irish Christian Brothers handed over ownership of Coláiste Éanna to the Trust in 2008.

The school operates six formal years of teaching from first to sixth year including an optional Transition Year in fourth Year. Every year is divided up into three or four classes with a maximum of 27 students per class in Junior Cycle and 20 in Senior Cycle. Subjects taught in the school include Accounting, Art, Biology, Business Studies, Chemistry, Computer Studies, CSPE, Design and Communication Graphics, Economics, English, Irish, French, Spanish, Geography, Graphics, History, Material Technology, Mathematics, Music, Physical Education, Physics, Religion, Science, SPHE, and Technical Graphics. Extra curricular activities include Hurling, Gaelic football, Soccer, Basketball, Golf, Table Tennis, athletics, theatre and drama, music and choir, debating, European Youth Parliament, chess, bridge, martial arts.

Coláiste Éanna is named after St Enda's School or Scoil Éanna which was founded by Patrick Pearse in 1908 and located in the Hermitage, Grange Road which is 1 km (0.62 mi) from the campus. All subjects are taught in English.

== Notable alumni ==
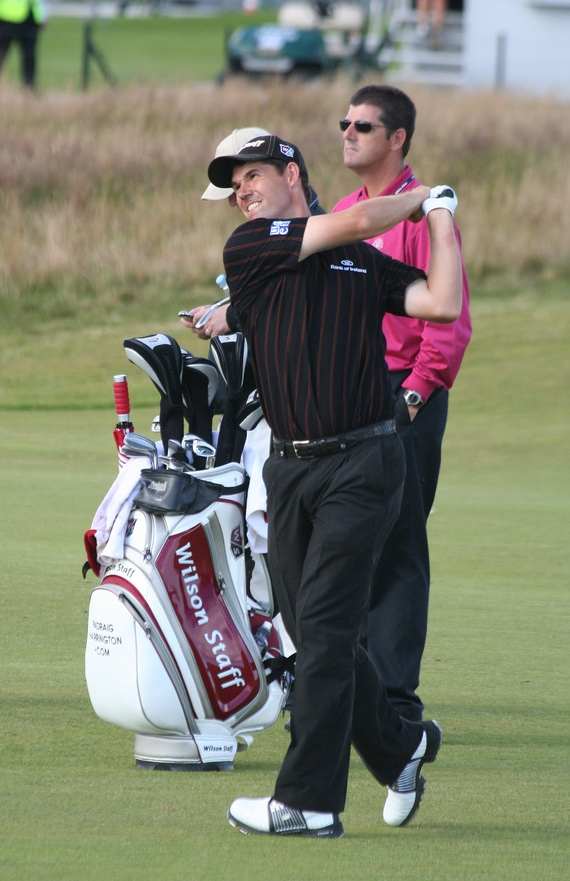
Pádraig Harrington, past pupil of Coláiste Éanna

- Mick Barry, former Teachta Dála
- Philip Cairns, 13-year-old boy who mysteriously vanished in 1986
- Pádraig Harrington, professional golfer
- Stephen Hiney, Dublin hurler
- Sean Hughes, comedian, writer and actor
- Brendan Leahy, bishop of Limerick
- George Lee, correspondent for Raidió Teilifís Éireann
- Paul McGinley, professional golfer
- Niall Mellon, entrepreneur
- Dave Mooney, professional footballer
- Colin Moran, Dublin footballer
- Paul Ryan, Dublin hurler
- Graham Shaw, field hockey player and coach
