= Nord Anglia International School Dublin =

School in Ireland, founded 2018

Location
- Leopardstown, D18 T672, Ireland; 53.266507°N 6.198577°W

Information
- School type: Private school, International school
- Founded: 2018
- Principal: Barnaby Sandow
- Age range: 3–18
- School fees: €15,900 to €24,000
- Website: Nord Anglia International School Dublin

Nord Anglia International School Dublin is a private international school that serves primary and secondary students. The school opened in 2018 and is located in the Leopardstown suburb of Dublin in Ireland.

It provides schooling for children from 3 years of age up to high school level (to age 16-18) and is the only school in Ireland to offer the International Baccalaureate for students from the preschool level through to secondary school.

It is privately funded by fees (the highest in Ireland) so the Department of Education does not perform oversight of the school, because it does not receive public funding. While the qualifications of teachers and the courses offered by the school are not inspected by the state, it is registered, under the Alternative Education Assessment and Registration Service (AEARS), by the Child and Family Agency (Tusla).

The school building is 8,175 square metres, set on a 2.43-hectare (6.0-acre) campus. It includes facilities for teaching science, technology, engineering, art and maths.
