= 2011 NCAA Division I men's basketball championship game =

American collegiate basketball game

2011 NCAA Tournament Championship Game
National championship game
Butler Bulldogs	Connecticut Huskies
Horizon	Big East
(28–9)	(31–9)
41	53
Head coach: Brad Stevens	Head coach: Jim Calhoun
- AP: NR
- Coaches: NR
- AP: 9
- Coaches: 8
	1st half	2nd half	Total
Butler Bulldogs	22	19	41
Connecticut Huskies	19	34	53
- Date: April 4, 2011
- Venue: Reliant Stadium, Houston, Texas
- MVP: Kemba Walker, UConn
- Favorite: Connecticut by 5.5
- Referees: John Cahill, Verne Harris, Doug Shows
- Attendance: 70,376

United States TV coverage
- Network: CBS
- Announcers: Jim Nantz (play-by-play); Clark Kellogg and Steve Kerr (color); Tracy Wolfson (sideline)
- Nielsen Ratings: 11.7

The 2011 NCAA Division I men's basketball championship game was the title game of the 2011 NCAA Division I men's basketball tournament and determined the national champion for the 2010-11 NCAA Division I men's basketball season. The game was played on April 4, 2011, at Reliant Stadium in Houston, Texas, and featured the West Regional Champion, #3-seeded Connecticut, versus the Southeast Regional Champion, #8 seeded Butler.

For the first time since the 1989 National Championship Game, neither a #1 nor a #2 seed participated in the National Championship Game. UConn defeated Butler in a defensive battle, 53–41, to win their third national title. The Bulldogs became the first team to lose in consecutive title games since the Fab Five-era Michigan Wolverines in 1992 and 1993.

== Participants ==
=== Butler Bulldogs ===
The Butler Bulldogs had made it back to the national championship for the second year in a row after losing their best player and eventual NBA star Gordon Hayward of the Oklahoma City Thunder. In their opener, they squeaked past Old Dominion 60–58. In the following game, Matt Howard made the game-winning free throw against Pittsburgh to come out on top 71–70. After defeating the Wisconsin Badgers in the Sweet Sixteen 61–54, they took the Florida Gators into overtime, emerging victorious 74–71 to earn a spot in the Final Four. They would defeat the Cinderella of the tournament, VCU, in another closely contested game, 70–62, to return to their second consecutive national championship game.

=== Connecticut Huskies ===
After failing to make the NCAA tournament the previous year, UConn got off to a hot start, winning their first 10 games of the 2010–11 season – including victories over #2 Michigan State and #8 Kentucky in the Maui Invitational – and climbing as high as #4 in the AP poll. However, they went on stumble down the stretch, finishing 9th in the Big East with a 9–9 record in conference play. Nonetheless, they earned a #3 seed in the West Region. After coasting to an easy victory over Bucknell 81–52 in the first round, the Huskies defeated the Cincinnati Bearcats 69–58 to advance to the Sweet Sixteen. After fighting past a dangerous San Diego State team that had entered the game with a 34–2 record 74–67, UConn faced off against Arizona in the Elite Eight. Behind the phenomenal play of Kemba Walker, the Huskies beat the Wildcats in a thriller 65–63 to advance to their 4th ever Final Four. They would pull off a 56–55 victory over the Kentucky Wildcats to set up a national championship match up with Butler.

== Starting lineups ==
Butler	Position		Connecticut
Shelvin Mack	G		† Kemba Walker
Shawn Vanzant	G	G/F	Jeremy Lamb
Chase Stigall	G	F	Roscoe Smith
Matt Howard	F		Tyler Olander
Andrew Smith	C	F/C	Alex Oriakhi
† 2011 Consensus First Team All-American

== Game summary ==
CBS

April 4, 2011
9:23 pm EDT

Box score

#SE8 Butler Bulldogs 41, #W3 Connecticut Huskies 53
Scoring by half: 22–19, 19–34
Pts: Shelvin Mack 13; Rebs: Shelvin Mack 9 Asts: Shawn Vanzant 2	Pts: Kemba Walker 16; Rebs: Alex Oriakhi 11; Asts: Jeremy Lamb, Shabazz Napier 2

Reliant Stadium, Houston, Texas
Attendance: 70,376
Referees: John Cahill, Verne Harris, Doug Shows

For the first time since 1989 there was not a #1 or #2 seed team in the championship game. Butler was only the second #8 seed to make it the championship game after the 1985 Villanova team, who took down the top-seeded Georgetown 66–64 in the final. The 2011 national championship game was between Butler, a mid-major university team that was a surprise finalist in the 2010 tournament, and The University of Connecticut, a basketball powerhouse which had previously won the tournament twice under coach Jim Calhoun but had had an average regular season, finishing 9th in the Big East before winning the conference tournament with five victories in five consecutive days (never before accomplished in NCAA history). The NCAA championship game was a very defensive contest, with UConn coming out on top 53–41 to win their third-ever national title and Butler scoring the fewest points in a championship game since 1949. The Bulldogs led at halftime 22–19, but suffered in the second half from poor shooting, making only 6 out of 37 shots in the second half. Butler's 18.8 percent shooting for the entire game was the lowest ever in the NCAA final. UConn contributed to Butler's poor shooting by blocking 10 shots, also a championship game record. Butler was led in scoring by junior guard Shelvin Mack with 13 points, while UConn freshman Jeremy Lamb scored 12 points in the 2nd half. The win by the Huskies completed a season-ending 11-game win streak that had begun with the Big East Tournament. The game was widely viewed as a poor-quality final. In reference to the game's first half of play, CBS analyst Greg Anthony said, "This is the worst half of basketball I've ever seen in a national championship game.”
