= Colin O'Reilly =

Irish basketball player

Personal information
- Born: 30 January 1984 (age 42) Cork, Ireland
- Listed height: 200 cm (6 ft 7 in)

Career information
- College: Post (2002–2004)
- Playing career: 2004–2022
- Position: Forward
- Coaching career: 2013–present

Career history

Playing
- 2004–2005: Killarney Gleneagle Lakers
- 2005–2006: UCC Demons
- 2006–2007: ETB SW Essen
- 2007: UCC Demons
- 2007–2008: USC Freiburg
- 2008–2009: UCC Demons
- 2009–2012: Cheshire Phoenix
- 2012–2013: Plymouth Raiders
- 2013–2016: UCC Demons
- 2015: →Hibernia
- 2017–2019: UCC Demons
- 2019–2020: Killorglin
- 2021–2022: Neptune

Coaching
- 2013–2016: UCC Demons
- 2016: Cheshire Phoenix
- 2017–2019: UCC Demons
- 2019–2020: Killorglin
- 2021–2023: Neptune

Career highlights
- 3× Irish League champion (2009, 2015, 2016); 3× Irish Champions Trophy winner (2014–2016); 4× Irish National Cup winner (2006, 2009, 2014, 2015)

Colin O'Reilly (born 30 January 1984) is an Irish basketball coach and former player. He played Division III college basketball for Post University in the United States in the early 2000s and later represented the Irish national team as both a player and as a player-coach.

== Early life ==
O'Reilly was born in Cork, Ireland.

== Professional career ==
On 26 March 2015, O'Reilly was named an inaugural Premier League All-Star First Pick alongside UCC Demons teammates Kyle Hosford and Lehmon Colbert. Three days later, he helped Demons create Irish basketball history by winning the Champions Trophy and adding to their undefeated 2014–15 season. With a 24–0 record, the team also won the League and National Cup titles. In addition, O'Reilly earned Champions Trophy MVP honours after scoring 25 points in the final. He was later named both Player of the Year and Coach of the Year for the 2014–15 season. In 2015–16, he helped Demons reclaim both the Premier League title and the Champions Trophy.

On 22 June 2016, O'Reilly was appointed head coach of the Cheshire Phoenix for the 2016–17 British Basketball League season. However, after a poor start to the season, he parted ways with the club in December 2016.

In July 2017, O'Reilly returned to UCC Demons as player-coach for the 2017–18 season. He parted ways with Demons after the 2018–19 season.

In June 2019, O'Reilly joined Killorglin as player-coach for the 2019–20 season.

O'Reilly was set to serve as player-coach of Neptune for the 2020–21 season before it was cancelled due to the COVID-19 pandemic. He returned as player-coach of Neptune for the 2021–22 season.

== Coaching career ==
For the 2022–23 season, O'Reilly continued on as Neptune's head coach. He began the 2023–24 season as coach before being replaced in November 2023.

== National team career ==
O'Reilly was head coach of the Irish senior men's team from 2014 to 2016, helping them to a fourth-placed finish at the 2016 FIBA European Championship for Small Countries.

In 2019, O'Reilly served as player-coach of the Irish 3x3 team at the FIBA 3x3 Europe Cup.

In April 2022, O'Reilly was re-appointed coach of the Irish men's 3x3 team. In March 2024, he was appointed coach of the Irish women's 3x3 team.

== Personal life ==
O'Reilly's older brother, Niall, also plays basketball. His sisters, Orla and Sinead, played college basketball for Binghamton University. After graduating, Orla went on to play professionally.

O'Reilly is a former Cork senior hurling championship winner. He played for Blackrock and helped them win the 2002 Cork Senior Hurling Championship.
