= 2010 Diamond Head Classic =

College basketball competition

- Season: 2010–11
- Teams: 8
- Finals site: Stan Sheriff Center, Honolulu, Hawaii
- Champions: Butler (1st title)
- Runner-up: Washington State (1st title game)
- Semifinalists: Baylor (1st semifinal); Florida State (1st semifinal)
- Winning coach: Brad Stevens (1st title)
- MVP: Matt Howard (Butler)

The 2010 Diamond Head Classic was a mid-season eight-team college basketball tournament played on December 22, 23, and 25 at the Stan Sheriff Center in Honolulu, Hawaii. The second annual Diamond Head Classic tournament was part of the 2010–11 NCAA Division I men's basketball season. Butler defeated Washington State to win the tournament championship. Matt Howard was named the tournament's MVP.

== Bracket ==
5th Place Game; December 25
Mississippi State	58
Hawai'i	67
7th Place Game; December 25
San Diego	67
Utah	64

Consolation 2nd Round; December 23
Mississippi State	69
San Diego	52
Utah	55
Hawai'i	68

First Round; December 22
Mississippi State	57
Washington State	83
San Diego	50
15	Baylor	83
Utah	62
20	Butler	74
Florida State	70
Hawai'i	62

Semifinals; December 23
Washington State	77
15	Baylor	71
Butler	67
Florida State	64

Championship; December 25
Washington State	68
Butler	84
3rd Place Game; December 25
Florida State	66
Baylor	61

== All-tournament team ==
Name	Position	College	Class
Matt Howard	PF	Butler	SR
Shelvin Mack	G	Butler	JR
Klay Thompson	G	Washington State	JR
LaceDarius Dunn	SG	Baylor	SR
Chris Singleton	SF	Florida State	JR
