= Mark Tyndale =

American basketball player and coach (born 1986)

New York Knicks
- Title: Assistant coach
- League: NBA

Personal information
- Born: January 4, 1986 (age 40) Philadelphia, Pennsylvania, U.S.
- Listed height: 6 ft 5 in (1.96 m)
- Listed weight: 210 lb (95 kg)

Career information
- High school: Simon Gratz (Philadelphia, Pennsylvania)
- College: Temple (2004–2008)
- NBA draft: 2008: undrafted
- Playing career: 2008–2018
- Position: Shooting guard

Career history

Playing
- 2008: Adelaide 36ers
- 2009–2010: Iowa Energy
- 2010–2011: Telekom Baskets Bonn
- 2012: BC Dnipro
- 2012: Sundsvall Dragons
- 2012–2013: Sioux Falls Skyforce
- 2013: Maine Red Claws
- 2013–2014: Ironi Ramat Gan
- 2014–2015: Elitzur Yavne
- 2015–2017: Reno Bighorns
- 2018: Memphis Hustle

Coaching
- 2019–2024: Toronto Raptors (player development coach)
- 2023–2025: Portland Trail Blazers (assistant)
- 2025–present: New York Knicks (player development coach)

Career highlights
- As player: NBA D-League All-Defensive Second Team (2013); Robert V. Geasey Trophy co-winner (2008); Second-team All-Atlantic 10 (2008); Atlantic 10 All-Rookie Team (2005); As assistant coach: NBA champion (2026); NBA Cup champion (2025)

Mark Mikal Tyndale (born January 4, 1986) is an American professional basketball coach and former player who currently serves as a player development assistant for the New York Knicks of the National Basketball Association (NBA). He played college basketball for the Temple Owls.

== College career ==
Tyndale played college basketball at Temple University. In his junior season, he averaged 19.5 points per game, second in the Atlantic 10 to teammate Dionte Christmas. He received First Team All-Big 5 honors.

As a senior, Tyndale was a Second Team All-Atlantic 10 selection. Along with Pat Calathes, he received the Robert V. Geasey Trophy honoring the best player in the Philadelphia Big 5 in 2008, following his senior season. He averaged 15.9 points and 7.4 rebounds per game that year. Temple reached the 2008 NCAA Men's Division I Basketball Tournament. Temple defeated by Michigan State with a score of 72–61, despite a team-high 16 points from Tyndale.

== Professional career ==
After going undrafted in the 2008 NBA draft, Tyndale moved to Australia and joined the Adelaide 36ers for the 2008–09 NBL season. However, his stint ended in November 2008 and he returned to the United States. In March 2009, he joined the Iowa Energy of the NBA Development League, and stuck with them for the 2009–10 season.

Tyndale played for teams in Germany, Ukraine, and Sweden from 2010 to 2012. The Sioux Falls Skyforce selected Tyndale in the second round of the 2012 NBA Development League Draft, and he joined the team for the 2012–13 season. He was traded to the Maine Red Claws on February 25, 2013. Tyndale was named to the D-League All-Defensive Second Team on April 26. Then between 2013 and 2015, he played in Israel.

On October 31, 2015, Tyndale was selected by the Reno Bighorns in the third round of the 2015 NBA Development League Draft.

On August 23, 2017, Tyndale was selected by the Memphis Hustle in the NBA G League expansion draft.

On February 17, 2018, Tyndale was acquired by the Memphis Hustle.

== Coaching career ==
=== Toronto Raptors ===
On September 9, 2019, Tyndale joined the Toronto Raptors as an assistant video coordinators/player development coach.

=== Portland Trail Blazers ===
On October 2, 2023, Tyndale was hired as assistant coach for the Portland Trail Blazers. On June 11, 2025, it was announced that Tyndale would not be retained as part of Chauncey Billups' staff going forward.

=== New York Knicks ===
On October 9, 2025, the New York Knicks hired Tyndale to serve as a player development assistant under head coach Mike Brown.
