= Andrew Smith (basketball, born 1990) =

American basketball player, born 1990

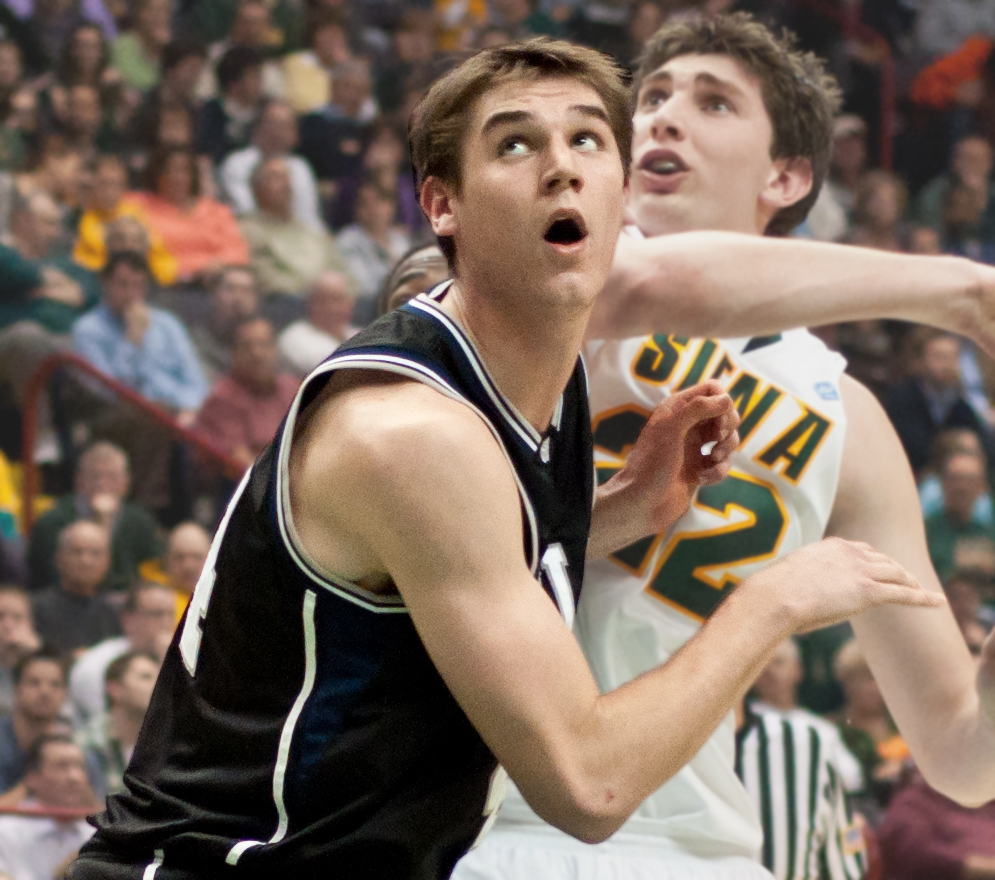
- Smith (front) with Butler in 2010

Personal information
- Born: September 9, 1990 Washington, D.C., U.S.
- Died: January 12, 2016 (aged 25) Indianapolis, Indiana, U.S.
- Listed height: 6 ft 11 in (2.11 m)
- Listed weight: 243 lb (110 kg)

Career information
- High school: Covenant Christian (Indianapolis, Indiana)
- College: Butler (2009–2013)
- NBA draft: 2013: undrafted
- Playing career: 2013–2014
- Position: Center
- Number: 44

Career history
- 2013–2014: Neptūnas

Career highlights
- Second-team Academic All-American (2013); Atlantic 10 All-Academic team (2013); Second-team NCSAA All-American (2009); USBWA Most Courageous Award (2016)

Andrew Smith (September 9, 1990 – January 12, 2016) was an American basketball player. He played in two NCAA Final Fours during his career at Butler, as well as professionally for Neptūnas.

Smith grew up in the Indianapolis, Indiana, area. He attended Covenant Christian High School where he became a star basketball player. During his senior year, he led the state of Indiana in rebounding, was named All-City player of the year, and was selected as a National Christian Schools Athletic Association All-American. After high school, Smith accepted a scholarship offer to play basketball at Butler.

At Butler, Smith was a reserve during his freshman year. Despite playing just three minutes during the previous month, he came into Butler's Elite Eight game against Kansas State and played a significant role in helping the school to its first ever Final Four appearance. Smith became a starter early in his sophomore year; his emergence helped Butler return to the Final Four. During Smith's junior year, he led the team in scoring and made more than 52% of his shot attempts. He also expanded his game to include 3-point shooting.

As a senior, Smith became a vocal leader for Butler and led the team in rebounding. Butler returned to the NCAA tournament where Smith recorded a career high and Butler tournament record 16 rebounds against Bucknell in a second-round match. Smith was selected as an Academic All-American and Senior CLASS Award recipient. He finished his college career with more than 1000 rebounds and 100 wins, one of just three Butler players to achieve the feat. He married his long-time girlfriend shortly after graduating from Butler with a degree in finance.

Smith died of cancer at the age of 25.

== Early life ==
Andrew Smith was born September 9, 1990, in Washington, D.C. Even at birth, Smith was big, measuring 24.25 inches (61.6 cm) long, about 4 inches (10 cm) above average. Smith's father, Curt, worked for Senator Dan Coats at the time before returning to his native Indiana when Andrew was a young boy. Curt was a high school basketball player for Pike High School, and was involved with basketball throughout Andrew's youth.

Andrew Smith grew up in Zionsville, Indiana. By the time he started high school at Covenant Christian, a small school of 300 students in Indianapolis, he stood at 6 feet 6 inches (1.98 m). His coach, Scott Flatt, called Smith "a freak" of nature because he had enough mobility to guard multiple positions despite his size. During his junior year, he averaged 14.5 points, 10.6 rebounds, and 2.8 blocked shots per game. Over the summer, he scored 28 points in game against top-tier AAU team The Family. Afterwards, recruiting picked up dramatically. Smith accepted an offer from Butler, where his mother was working at the time. He said that as soon as Butler became interested in him, he knew that was where he was going to play his college basketball. "It's like a perfect fit for me," he said.

During his senior year, Smith missed 8 of his team's 23 games, with a stress fracture. Even so, he was named Indianapolis Star All-City Player of the Year and was named to the National Christian Schools Athletic Association (NCSAA) Super Regional Team. He led Covenant Christian to a Class 2A sectional championship, and led the state in rebounding (17.1 per game). He averaged 23.3 points, marking his third straight year of averaging a double-double, and blocked 2.3 shots per game. He was an honorable mention for the All-State team and was a second team NCSAA All-American. He became the first player in Covenant's history to score 1,000 career points & finished with 1,098 career points. He also had 887 Career Rebounds & 62 Career Blocks. He was a McDonald's All-American Nominee for the state of Indiana.

After his senior season, Smith was selected to participate in the Hoosier Basketball Top 60 Senior Boys Workout. He played in the North–South Indiana All-Star Classic and the Hoosiers' Reunion All-Star Classic.

== College ==
Smith attended Butler for college. During the 2009–10 season, his freshman year, he was a reserve, playing in 24 games. In an Elite Eight match against Kansas State, Smith was inserted into the lineup when Matt Howard got into early foul trouble. Smith played five minutes in the first half, helping Butler build an 18–10 lead. He also played in the second half, finishing with a season-high 12 minutes. Over the previous month, he had played just three minutes in total. With Smith's help, Butler advanced to the school's first ever Final Four, which happened to be in Indianapolis. At the end of his Butler career, Smith said the Kansas State game was his favorite memory of Butler. Butler ended up making it the NCAA Championship Game.

During his sophomore year, Smith played in all 38 games, starting 32. After Butler got off to a mediocre 3–2 start, Smith was added to the starting lineup. Against Cleveland State, he scored a career-high 22 points and collected 10 rebounds to get his first collegiate double-double. In the final game of the regular season, he played a career-high 36 minutes and recorded 11 rebounds, 3 steals, and 3 blocks, all career highs. Thanks in large part to Smith's emergence as a starter, Butler returned to the NCAA Tournament. During the round of 32, Smith hit a go-ahead basket with less than 3 seconds on the clock to help Butler beat top seeded Pittsburgh. In Butler's sweet 16 match against Wisconsin, Smith hurt his ankle and left the game. However, he returned before the game's end, collecting eight points and six rebounds as Butler advanced to the regional final. Butler again advanced to the Championship game. Smith led the team in rebounding in the regional final against Florida and in the National Championship game against Connecticut. He finished the year as the team's second-leading rebounder (5.6 per game) and third-leading scorer (8.5). He made 59.3% of his field goal attempts and 67.3% of his free throws.

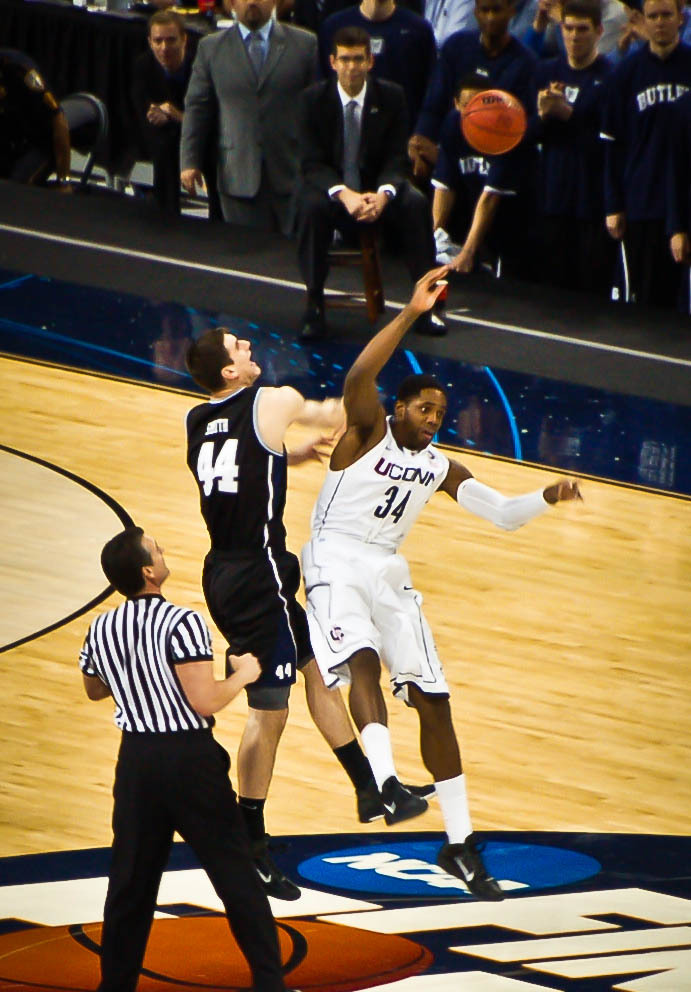
Andrew Smith battles Connecticut's Alex Oriakhi for the opening tip during the 2011 National Championship Game.

Following the graduation of Howard and the early departure of Shelvin Mack to play in the NBA, Butler struggled during Smith's junior year. Smith, however, continued to put up solid numbers. He recorded two double-doubles, one against Chattanooga and one against Oakland City, and had a game-winning tip-in shot against Purdue. At Loyola, he grabbed a career-high 13 rebounds. At Milwaukee, he recorded four assists and four steals, both career highs. In the first round of the Horizon League tournament, Smith scored a career high 25 points, hitting a career best 12 of 14 free throws, and recording 7 rebounds. Butler failed to make the NCAA Tournament, instead playing in the College Basketball Invitational (CBI). In the semi-finals of the CBI, Smith scored 19 points and grabbed 6 rebounds. For the season, he led the team in scoring with 10.9 points per game. He emerged as a 3-point field goal threat, making 19 of 54 attempts after attempting just one 3-pointer the previous year. Overall, Smith made 52.5% of his field goal attempts and 64.3% of his free throws.

During the off-season, head coach Brad Stevens asked Smith to take on a new role – vocal leader. The role did not fit Smith's natural personality, but he embraced it nonetheless. Entering the 2012–13 season, Smith was the only active college player who had played in two Final Fours. He started 35 games during the year, sitting out one game with an injury. Facing reigning Atlantic 10 Defensive Player of the year, St. Joseph's C. J. Aiken, Smith scored 24 points and grabbed 10 rebounds. He also recorded double-doubles at Northwestern and at Massachusetts. For the week of January 14, he was named as the Atlantic 10 Player of the Week for his part in back-to-back road victories. At Massachusetts on March 7, Smith became the 11th player in Butler history to surpass 1,000 points and 600 rebounds. In the lone game he missed, Butler was upset at home by Charlotte, underscoring Smith's importance to the team. Butler returned to the NCAA tournament, and Smith recorded 14 points and 16 rebounds against Bucknell in the round of 64. The 16 rebounds represented both a career-high for Smith and a Butler tournament record. In the round of 32, he scored 17 and grabbed a game-high eight rebounds. With Butler trailing by two in the final seconds, Smith got the ball to attempt a game winning three but stumbled and did not get off a good shot.

Smith led the team in rebounding for the season (6.1 per game) and led Butler in rebounding 13 times. He was second in scoring, averaging 11.3 points. He made 49.6% of his shot attempts and 71.8% of his free throws. Defensively, Smith had strong games against future NBA players Cody Zeller, Kelly Olynyk, and Mike Muscala. He was named to the Atlantic 10 All-Academic Team, and was selected as a second team Academic All-American. He was also a second team Senior CLASS Award selection, recognizing his achievement in athletic competition, character, academics, and community involvement.

Smith finished his Butler career 5th all-time on the schools list of games played (134), 12th in rebounding (648), and 25th in points scored (1,147). He played in 11 NCAA tournament games, tied for 6th on Butler's all-time list. He scored 73 points in those games, good enough for fifth place all-time, and grabbed 65 rebounds, the second most ever. Smith is just one of three Butler players, along with Howard and Joel Cornette, to amass more than 100 wins and more than 1,000 points in his career. Smith called his Butler experience "as good as it gets" and remarked "I know that I've received a great education to help me in the future and obviously I've had a great basketball career with the success that we've had. It's kind of been a win-win for me and I really have a lot of great opportunities coming out of school." He added that the experience prepared him well for a pro career: "we played just about every single good team you can in my four years there. We contended with just about all of them. [So, ] I know I can play".

Smith had finished his Butler classes by February 2013. In between finishing classes and graduation in May, he interned at the Butler Business Accelerator, consulting with pharmaceutical and financial service businesses. Previously, he interned with a venture capital firm during the summer of 2012. Smith graduated in May with a degree in finance.

== Professional career ==
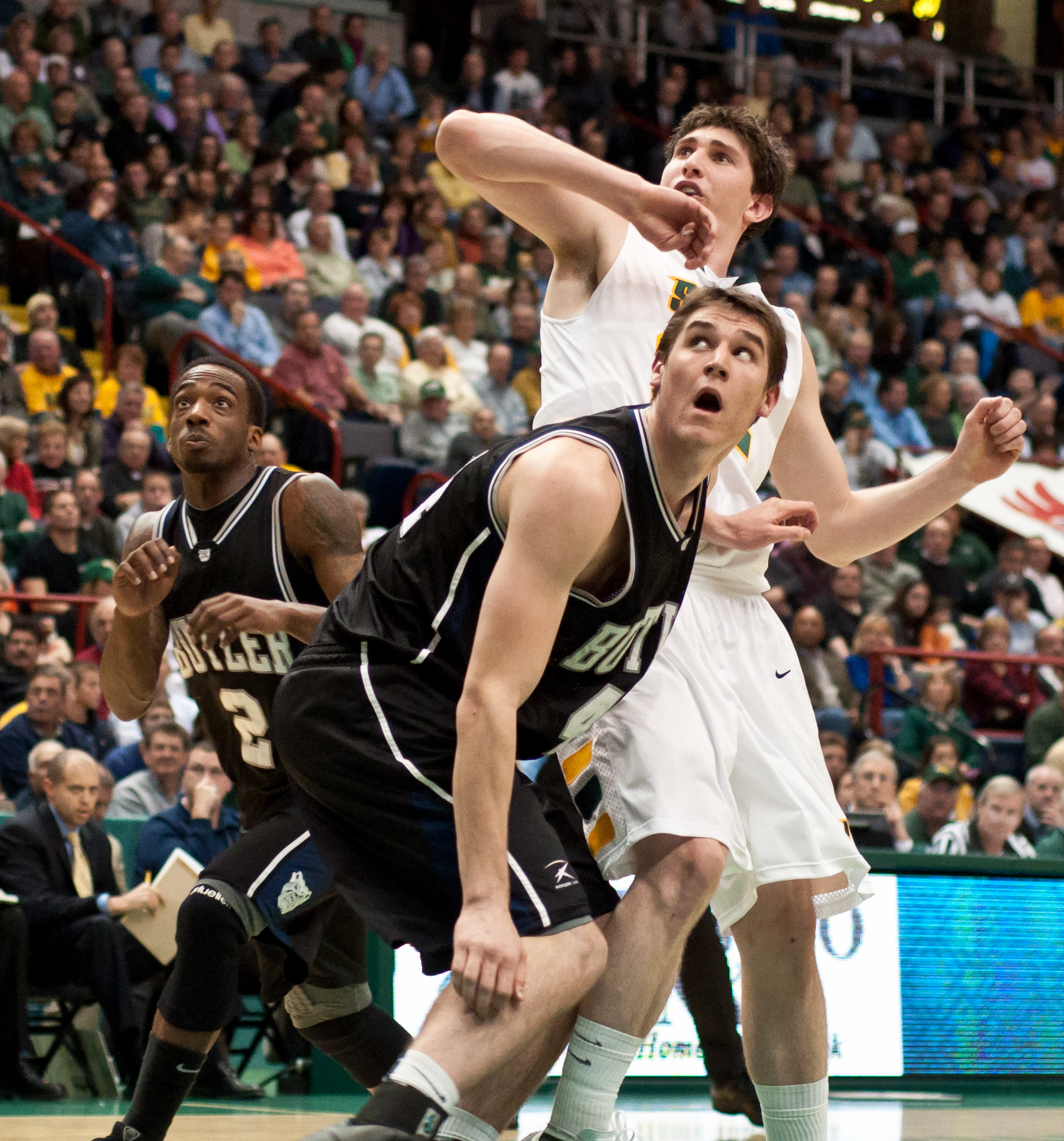
Andrew Smith (front, dark uniform) anticipates the rebound in a game against Siena on November 23, 2010.

Smith participated in the Portsmouth Invitational Tournament, a post-season tournament for NBA prospects, averaging 5.3 points and 6.7 rebounds. Prior to the NBA draft, Smith trained at the St. Vincent Sports Performance Center in Indianapolis, working with former teammates Matt Howard and Gordon Hayward. He said he was concentrating on improving his mid-range game, which he rarely used in college.

Smith worked out for six NBA teams, including the Indiana Pacers twice. He was not expected to be drafted, but received offers to play for the Pacers and Oklahoma City Thunder teams. When he was not drafted, he took the Thunder's offer, playing on their 2013 Summer team.

On September 1, 2013, the Lithuanian club Neptūnas announced that they had signed Smith for the 2013–14 season.

=== Skill set ===
Smith was listed as 6 feet 11 inches (2.11 m) tall, weighing 243 pounds (110 kg). He was a competent 3-point shooter and rarely dunked the ball, both rare traits for a center.

== Personal life ==
=== Family ===
Smith's father, Curt, is the president of the Indiana Family Institute. Smith's mother, Debbie, worked as an administrative assistant for Butler University before retiring. Andrew Smith has three siblings: an older brother, Stephen, an older sister Julie, and a younger sister Kimberly. He is distantly related to former Butler player Pete Campbell. Smith's best friend in high school, soccer player Blake Leyden, was his roommate at Butler.

On May 18, 2013, Smith married his longtime girlfriend Samantha (née Stage). Stage met Smith through her best friend and Smith's sister, Kimberly. Like Smith, she has a competitive personality and is involved in sports. She played volleyball and tennis in high school. Stage is just 5 feet 1 inch (1.55 m) tall, leading to numerous funny photo opportunities. For example, at prom, Smith danced with Stage on his knees. While Smith was at Butler, Stage worked as a nanny and took online classes in psychology.

Smith was called a "goofball" and was a self-described introvert. "He is constantly making me laugh," said Stage. Smith said that would have liked to have six children if he and his wife became financially stable.

Following his health crisis in 2014, Smith's coach at Butler, Brad Stevens, said about Smith and his wife,

It's miraculous. It's an absolute miracle. There is no other way to interpret this. They've been through more in a 20-month marriage than a lot of people go through in the first 20 years. I was amazed. He amazes me every time I talk to him. When he got to Butler he was a really bright guy trying to find his way playing basketball. He became one of the most confident, toughest, hardest-working players I've ever coached. And Sam is an absolute rock.

Smith then returned to the job he held before his cardiac arrest, and coached in a church-based youth basketball league. In Norlander's piece, he also briefly discussed his Christian faith, saying,

I'm not on this earth to go out and play basketball games. I'm on this earth to share a story people can hear ... Our faith gives everything that happened last year a purpose. ... If I was going to bring one person back from a dark place, and we've had hundreds and hundreds of letters, then this entire year was worth it.

=== Cancer and death ===
Smith's basketball career prematurely ended in January 2014. After noticing a suspicious bump on his neck, he began having increasing difficulty breathing. Initially, it was thought that he did not have cancer, but a later MRI scan revealed a suspected cancerous tumor in one of his lungs, and he returned to the U.S. Doctors in Indianapolis determined he was suffering from non-Hodgkin lymphoma, and soon made a more specific diagnosis of T-cell lymphoblastic lymphoma. This type of cancer, normally found in children, has a 50-50 survival rate for that age group, but is less survivable for adults. He immediately went on a chemotherapy regimen that had to be specially calibrated for his unusually large frame. While undergoing treatment, he took a job with a leasing and financing company owned by family friends.

On July 31, 2014, on his third day on the job, Smith collapsed at his office in a building next to Indianapolis International Airport and went into cardiac arrest for more than 22 minutes before being revived and rushed to a nearby hospital. He was immediately placed into a medically induced coma, and awoke four days later. While doctors would not officially link the cardiac arrest with his cancer battle, both Smith's wife and father believe the two were related. By December of that year, he had completed his final chemotherapy treatment, and went under what is called "maintenance" treatment, in which he continued to take several medications. While he had yet to fully regain his strength, he had not suffered any apparent neurological damage from his prolonged cardiac arrest. In a 2015 article on Smith's struggles, CBS Sports journalist Matt Norlander said, "The fact Andrew left the hospital with full control of his faculties barely a week later – and has not suffered any setbacks – is supernatural."

He received a bone marrow transplant in November 2015, but his condition worsened; his wife reported in a December 2015 post to their blog that the lymphoma had become an aggressive leukemia. He remained hospitalized until shortly before Christmas, when he was released to spend the holiday at home. Smith's condition worsened again in early January 2016 and he was readmitted to the hospital. Stevens, now the head coach of the Boston Celtics, missed a January 7 game against the Chicago Bulls to visit with Smith, who was reportedly scheduled to receive a second bone marrow transplant that day. Three days later, Smith's wife posted on their blog that he was near death, saying, "The doctors tell me death is imminent and that Andrew is going to die from this disease. There are no treatments, no clinical trials...there is nothing left to do." Smith died in his sleep on January 12, 2016, at the age of 25.

Following his death, the United States Basketball Writers Association (USBWA) named him and his widow as recipients of the 2016 men's version of its Most Courageous Award. The USBWA specifically cited their public battle with cancer and advocacy for bone marrow registry; during his memorial service, the Smith family set up a table in the church lobby to sign up marrow donors.

Samantha Smith has become a public speaker about overcoming adversity, in her case leaving a dysfunctional home at age 14 and being widowed at age 23.
