= 2010–11 Butler Bulldogs men's basketball team =

American college basketball season

2010–11 Butler Bulldogs men's basketball
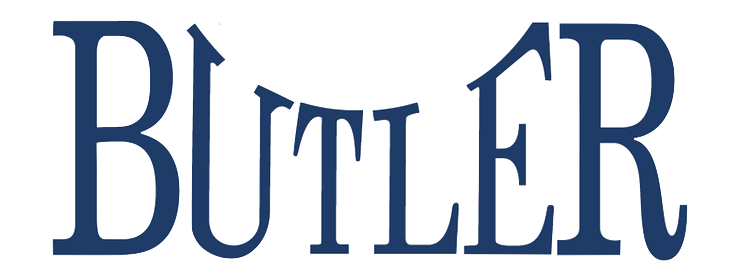

NCAA tournament, Runner-up Diamond Head Classic champions Horizon League Regular Season co-champions Horizon League tournament champions

National Championship Game, L 41–53 vs. Connecticut
- Conference: Horizon League

Ranking
- Coaches: No. 2
- Record: 28–10 (13–5 Horizon)
- Head coach: Brad Stevens (4th season)
- Assistant coaches: Matthew Graves (8th season); Terry Johnson (4th season); Micah Shrewsberry (3rd season)
- Home arena: Hinkle Fieldhouse

2010–11 Horizon League men's basketball standings
	Conf.				Overall
Team	W		L	PCT	W		L	PCT
*Milwaukee	13	–	5	.722	19	–	14	.576
† Butler	13	–	5	.722	28	–	10	.737
Cleveland State	13	–	5	.722	27	–	9	.750
Valparaiso	12	–	6	.667	23	–	12	.657
Wright State	10	–	8	.556	19	–	14	.576
Detroit	10	–	8	.556	17	–	16	.515
Green Bay	8	–	10	.444	14	–	18	.438
Loyola (IL)	7	–	11	.389	16	–	15	.516
Youngstown State	2	–	16	.111	9	–	21	.300
UIC	2	–	16	.111	7	–	24	.226
† 2011 Horizon League Tournament winner * Tournament #1 seed As of April 4, 2011; Rankings from Coaches Poll

The 2010–11 Butler Bulldogs men's basketball team represented Butler University in the 2010–11 NCAA Division I men's basketball season. Their head coach was Brad Stevens, serving his 4th year. The Bulldogs played their home games at the Hinkle Fieldhouse, which has a capacity of approximately 10,000. They are members of the Horizon League.

They were the first team to reach consecutive final four without being a one or a two seed either year. By reaching the 2011 NCAA Division I men's basketball tournament championship game, they were the second eight-seed team to do so and the first since the 1984–85 Villanova Wildcats. They were the first non-BCS school to reach the championship game in back-to-back seasons since the 1960–61 and 1961–62 Cincinnati Bearcats. They were also the first team to reach the championship game without being ranked in the final college basketball polls since the 1987–88 Kansas Jayhawks. They were the first national runner-up to return to the championship game since the 1990–91 Duke Blue Devils (not counting the Fab Five teams affected by the University of Michigan basketball scandal). In 2011, they lost the National Championship to The University of Connecticut Huskies 53–41.

== 2010 recruiting class ==
College recruiting
Name	Hometown	School	Height	Weight	Commit date
Erik Fromm; Power Forward	Bloomington, IN	Bloomington South High School	6 ft 9 in (2.06 m)	200 lb (91 kg)	May 20, 2009
Erik Fromm; Power Forward	Recruit ratings: Scout: Rivals: (84)				
Chrishawn Hopkins; Shooting Guard	Indianapolis, IN	Emmerich Manual High School	6 ft 1 in (1.85 m)	160 lb (73 kg)	Aug 10, 2009
Chrishawn Hopkins; Shooting Guard	Recruit ratings: Scout: Rivals: (74)				
Khyle Marshall; Small Forward	Davie, FL	Flanagan High School	6 ft 6 in (1.98 m)	200 lb (91 kg)	Sep 30, 2009
Khyle Marshall; Small Forward	Recruit ratings: Scout: Rivals: (92)				
Overall recruit ranking:
Note: In many cases, Scout, Rivals, 247Sports, On3, and ESPN may conflict in their listings of height and weight.; In these cases, the average was taken. ESPN grades are on a 100-point scale.; Sources: "Men's Basketball Recruiting". Scout.; "ESPN – Butler Bulldogs Basketball Recruiting 2010". ESPN.; "Scout.com Team Recruiting Rankings". Scout.; "2010 Team Ranking". Rivals.

== Roster ==
2010–11 Butler Bulldogs men's basketball team
Players
Coaches

Pos.	#	Name	Height	Weight	Year	Previous school	Hometown
G/F	11	Alex Anglin (W)	6 ft 5 in (1.96 m)	177 lb (80 kg)	RS Sr	Kokomo	Kokomo, IN
F	32	Garrett Butcher	6 ft 7 in (2.01 m)	209 lb (95 kg)	Jr	Edgewood	Ellettsville, IN
F	4	Erik Fromm	6 ft 9 in (2.06 m)	220 lb (100 kg)	Fr	Bloomington South	Bloomington, IN
G	3	Zach Hahn	6 ft 1 in (1.85 m)	176 lb (80 kg)	Sr	New Castle Chrysler	New Castle, IN
G	20	Chrishawn Hopkins	6 ft 1 in (1.85 m)	165 lb (75 kg)	Fr	Manual	Indianapolis, IN
F	54	Matt Howard	6 ft 8 in (2.03 m)	230 lb (104 kg)	Sr	Connersville	Connersville, IN
C	30	Emerson Kampen (W)	6 ft 9 in (2.06 m)	189 lb (86 kg)	RS So	Yorktown	Yorktown, IN
G	22	Grant Leiendecker	6 ft 5 in (1.96 m)	182 lb (83 kg)	RS Sr	Homestead	Fort Wayne, IN
G	1	Shelvin Mack	6 ft 3 in (1.91 m)	215 lb (98 kg)	Jr	Bryan Station	Lexington, KY
F	23	Khyle Marshall	6 ft 7 in (2.01 m)	210 lb (95 kg)	Fr	Flanagan	Davie, FL
G	5	Ronald Nored	6 ft 0 in (1.83 m)	174 lb (79 kg)	Jr	Homewood	Homewood, AL
C	44	Andrew Smith	6 ft 11 in (2.11 m)	239 lb (108 kg)	So	Covenant Christian	Indianapolis, IN
G	33	Chase Stigall	6 ft 4 in (1.93 m)	195 lb (88 kg)	RS So	New Castle Chrysler	New Castle, IN
G	2	Shawn Vanzant	6 ft 0 in (1.83 m)	172 lb (78 kg)	Sr	Wharton	Tampa, FL

Head coach

- Brad Stevens (DePauw)

Assistant coach(es)

- Matthew Graves (Butler)
- Terry Johnson (Purdue Fort Wayne)
- Micah Shrewsberry (Hanover)

Legend

- (C) Team captain
- (S) Suspended
- (I) Ineligible
- (W) Walk-on
- Injured
- Current redshirt

Roster
Last update: 2010-Aug-31

== Schedule ==
Date time, TV	Rank^{#}	Opponent^{#}	Result	Record	High points	High rebounds	High assists	Site (attendance) city, state
Exhibition
October 30*; 2:00 pm	No. 17	Florida Southern	W 90–70		19 – Howard	7 – Howard	6 – Mack	Hinkle Fieldhouse (5,544); Indianapolis, IN
November 4*; 7:00 pm	No. 17	Hanover	W 80–41		13 – Mack	10 – Howard	4 – Nored	Hinkle Fieldhouse (5,549); Indianapolis, IN
Regular season
November 13*; 2:00 pm, WNDY; HLN	No. 17	Marian (IN)	W 83–54	1–0	20 – Mack	7 – Howard	5 – Nored	Hinkle Fieldhouse (6,824); Indianapolis, IN
November 16*; 8:00 pm, ESPN	No. 16	at Louisville	L 73–88	1–1	25 – Mack	9 – Howard	5 – Hahn	KFC Yum! Center (22,723); Louisville, KY
November 20*; 2:00 pm, WNDY	No. 16	Ball State	W 88–55	2–1	19 – Mack	10 – Howard	4 – Mack	Hinkle Fieldhouse (7,038); Indianapolis, IN
November 23*; 7:00 pm, WNDY		at Siena	W 70–57	3–1	17 – Howard	12 – Howard	4 – Mack	Times Union Center (8,444); Albany, NY
November 27*; 2:00 pm, WNDY		Evansville	L 68–71 ^{OT}	3–2	19 – Howard	12 – Howard	2 – Tied	Hinkle Fieldhouse (6,622); Indianapolis, IN
December 1; 8:00 pm, WNDY		at Loyola Chicago	W 65–63	4–2 (1–0)	15 – Tied	7 – Howard	4 – Vanzant	Gentile Center (3,758); Chicago, IL
December 4*; 3:30 pm, ESPN		vs. No. 1 Duke; CARQUEST Auto Parts Classic	L 70–82	4–3	14 – Vanzant	6 – Smith	6 – Nored	Izod Center (14,215); East Rutherford, NJ
December 9*; 9:00 pm, ESPN		at Xavier	L 49–51	4–4	17 – Howard	6 – Tied	5 – Nored	Cintas Center (10,250); Cincinnati, OH
December 11*; 7:00 pm, WNDY		Mississippi Valley State	W 91–71	5–4	26 – Howard	6 – Mack	8 – Mack	Hinkle Fieldhouse (5,677); Indianapolis, IN
December 18*; 2:00 pm, CBS		Stanford	W 83–50	6–4	27 – Howard	10 – Howard	5 – Mack	Hinkle Fieldhouse (8,012); Indianapolis, IN
December 22*; 11:00 pm, ESPNU		vs. Utah; Diamond Head Classic Opening Round	W 74–62	7–4	23 – Howard	6 – Tied	5 – Nored	Stan Sheriff Center (–); Honolulu, HI
December 23*; 10:00 pm, ESPN2		vs. Florida State; Diamond Head Classic Semifinals	W 67–64	8–4	19 – Howard	9 – Howard	5 – Mack	Stan Sheriff Center (–); Honolulu, HI
December 25*; 9:30 pm, ESPN2		vs. Washington State; Diamond Head Classic Championship	W 84–68	9–4	20 – Mack	11 – Howard	4 – Hahn	Stan Sheriff Center (6,367); Honolulu, HI
January 1; 2:00 pm, WNDY		Valparaiso	W 76–59	10–4 (2–0)	16 – Mack	8 – Howard	6 – Mack	Hinkle Fieldhouse (8,024); Indianapolis, IN
January 3; 8:00 pm, ESPN3		at Milwaukee	L 52–76	10–5 (2–1)	14 – Howard	6 – Howard	4 – Nored	US Cellular Arena (4,027); Milwaukee, WI
January 7; 7:00 pm, ESPNU		Cleveland State	W 79–56	11–5 (3–1)	22 – Smith	10 – Smith	3 – Tied	Hinkle Fieldhouse (7,071); Indianapolis, IN
January 9; 2:00 pm, WNDY		Youngstown State	W 84–79	12–5 (4–1)	28 – Mack	6 – Tied	3 – Mack	Hinkle Fieldhouse (5,789); Indianapolis, IN
January 14; 9:00 pm, ESPNU		at Detroit	W 87–63	13–5 (5–1)	17 – Howard	7 – Mack	7 – Nored	Calihan Hall (6,674); Detroit, MI
January 16; 7:00 pm, WNDY		at Wright State	L 64–69	13–6 (5–2)	15 – Smith	8 – Smith	4 – Mack	Nutter Center (7,603); Fairborn, OH
January 21; 7:00 pm, ESPNU		Green Bay	W 81–75	14–6 (6–2)	29 – Howard	16 – Howard	4 – Mack	Hinkle Fieldhouse (7,666); Indianapolis, IN
January 23; 2:00 pm, WNDY		Milwaukee	L 80–86 ^{OT}	14–7 (6–3)	23 – Mack	10 – Tied	5 – Mack	Hinkle Fieldhouse (6,745); Indianapolis, IN
January 29; 2:00 pm, ESPN3; WNDY; HLN		at Valparaiso	L 79–85 ^{OT}	14–8 (6–4)	17 – Tied	10 – Howard	4 – Mack	The ARC (5,432); Valparaiso, IN
February 3; 7:00 pm		at Youngstown State	L 60–62	14–9 (6–5)	18 – Mack	8 – Mack	3 – Tied	Beeghly Center (3,047); Youngstown, OH
February 5; 12:00 pm, ESPN2; ESPN3		at Cleveland State	W 73–61	15–9 (7–5)	14 – Howard	6 – Mack	7 – Mack	Wolstein Center (8,490); Cleveland, OH
February 7; 7:00 pm, WNDY		UIC	W 72–65	16–9 (8–5)	17 – Mack	8 – Nored	4 – Vanzant	Hinkle Fieldhouse (5,287); Indianapolis, IN
February 10; 7:00 pm, ESPNU		Wright State	W 71–63	17–9 (9–5)	20 – Mack	6 – Smith	5 – Nored	Hinkle Fieldhouse (6,726); Indianapolis, IN
February 12; 8:00 pm, ESPN2; ESPN3		Detroit	W 66–51	18–9 (10–5)	32 – Mack	12 – Howard	3 – Vanzant	Hinkle Fieldhouse (9,004); Indianapolis, IN
February 15; 8:00 pm, ESPN3		at Green Bay	W 64–62	19–9 (11–5)	22 – Howard	8 – Tied	6 – Mack	Resch Center (5,031); Green Bay, WI
February 19; 2:00 pm, ESPN3		at UIC	W 79–52	20–9 (12–5)	19 – Howard	9 – Tied	6 – Mack	UIC Pavilion (5,292); Chicago, IL
February 26; 2:00 pm, WNDY		Loyola Chicago; Senior Day	W 63–56	21–9 (13–5)	18 – Mack	11 – Smith	3 – Mack	Hinkle Fieldhouse (10,000); Indianapolis, IN
Horizon League tournament
March 5; 6:00 pm, ESPNU	(2)	vs. (3) Cleveland State; Semifinals	W 76–68	22–9	18 – Vanzant	8 – Tied	3 – Nored	U.S. Cellular Arena (–); Milwaukee, WI
March 8; 9:00 pm, ESPN	(2)	at (1) Milwaukee; Championship Game	W 59–44	23–9	18 – Howard	10 – Smith	4 – Mack	U.S. Cellular Arena (10,437); Milwaukee, WI
NCAA tournament
March 17*; 12:40 pm, truTV	(8 SE)	vs. (9 SE) Old Dominion; NCAA Second Round	W 60–58	24–9	15 – Tied	8 – Howard	7 – Mack	Verizon Center (17,578); Washington, DC
March 19*; 7:10 pm, TBS	(8 SE)	vs. (1 SE) No. 4 Pittsburgh; NCAA Third Round	W 71–70	25–9	30 – Mack	6 – Tied	4 – Vanzant	Verizon Center (18,684); Washington, DC
March 24*; 9:57 pm, TBS	(8 SE)	vs. (4 SE) No. 16 Wisconsin; NCAA Sweet Sixteen	W 61–54	26–9	20 – Howard	12 – Howard	4 – Vanzant	New Orleans Arena (12,320); New Orleans, LA
March 26*; 4:30 pm, CBS	(8 SE)	vs. (2 SE) No. 13 Florida; NCAA Elite Eight	W 74–71 ^{OT}	27–9	27 – Mack	8 – Smith	4 – Mack	New Orleans Arena (12,139); New Orleans, LA
April 2*; 6:09 pm, CBS	(8 SE)	vs. (11 SW) VCU; NCAA Final Four	W 70–62	28–9	24 – Mack	9 – Marshall	2 – Tied	Reliant Stadium (75,421); Houston, TX
April 4*; 9:00 pm, CBS	(8 SE)	vs. (3 W) No. 8 Connecticut; NCAA National Championship	L 41–53	28–10	13 – Mack	9 – Mack	2 – Vanzant	Reliant Stadium (70,376); Houston, TX
*Non-conference game. ^{#}Rankings from AP Poll. (#) Tournament seedings in parentheses. All times are in Eastern Time. (#) Indicates seed in NCAA Tournament. ER = East Region. WR = West Region. SE = Southeast Region. SW = Southwest Region.

== Rankings ==
Ranking movement Legend: ██ Improvement in ranking. ██ Decrease in ranking. RV – Received votes.
Poll	Pre	Wk 1	Wk 2	Wk 3	Wk 4	Wk 5	Wk 6	Wk 7	Wk 8	Wk 9	Wk 10	Wk 11	Wk 12	Wk 13	Wk 14	Wk 15	Wk 16	WK 17	Wk 18	Final
AP	17	16	RV	–	–	–	–	RV	RV	–	RV	–	–	–	–	–	RV	RV	RV	
Coaches	18	18	23	RV	–	–	–	RV	RV	–	RV	–	–	–	–	–	–	–	RV	2
Mid-Major	1	2	2	7	8	8	10	6	5	5	6	12	15	13	13	12	8	7	6	1

== Preseason ==
=== Preseason rankings ===
Publication	Rank
AP	17
ESPN/USA Today Coaches' Poll	18
Athlon	21
Lindy's	8
Sporting News	19
Fox Sports	24
CBS Sports	19
Rivals.com	16
CollegeInsider.com Mid Major	1

=== Preseason awards ===
#	Name	Class	Award
54	Matt Howard	Sr.	Preseason All-Horizon 1st Team
1	Shelvin Mack	Jr.	John R. Wooden All-American Pre-Season Candidate; Horizon League Preseason Player of the Year; Pre-Season All-Horizon 1st Team; AP Preseason All-America Honorable Mention; Naismith Pre-Season Candidate

=== Preseason game capsules ===
10/30 – Butler vs Florida Southern

Team	1st Half	2nd Half	Final
FLS	37	33	70
BU	43	47	90

Butler Rolls Past Florida Southern, 90–70
Senior Matt Howard scored a game-high 19 points and teammate Ronald Nored added 14 to lead #17/18 Butler to a 90–70 victory over visiting Florida Southern in an exhibition men's basketball game at Hinkle Fieldhouse on Saturday, Oct. 30, afternoon. The game was Butler's first 2010–11 test.

11/4 – Butler vs Hanover

Team	1st Half	2nd Half	Final
HAN	21	20	41
BU	45	35	80

Butler Drops Hanover, 80–41, In Exhibition Game
Junior Shelvin Mack scored a game-high 13 points and senior Matt Howard added a double-double to lead Butler to an 80–41 victory over visiting Hanover in an exhibition contest at Hinkle Fieldhouse on Thursday, Nov. 4. The game was the final preseason test for the Bulldogs.

== Regular season ==
=== Regular-season awards ===
#	Name	Class	Season Awards
54	Matt Howard	Sr.	2011 Lowe's Senior CLASS Award Candidate; 12/20 Horizon League Player of the Week; Diamond Head Classic All-Tournament Team; Diamond Head Classic Tournament MVP; 12/27 Horizon League Player of the Week; 2011 Wooden Award Mid-Season Top 30; Horizon League December Male Scholar-Athlete
1	Shelvin Mack	Jr.	Diamond Head Classic All-Tournament Team

=== Regular-season game capsules ===
11/13 – Butler vs Marian

Team	1st Half	2nd Half	Final
MRN	28	26	54
BU	42	41	83

Butler Rolls Past Marian, 83–54
Junior Shelvin Mack scored a game-high 20 points to lead Butler to an 83–54 victory over visiting Marian in the season-opener for the Bulldogs at Hinkle Fieldhouse on Saturday, Nov. 13. All 14 Butler players saw action in the win and 12 cracked the scoring column.

11/16 – Butler at Louisville

Team	1st Half	2nd Half	Final
LOU	41	47	88
BU	23	50	73

Bulldogs Fall At Louisville, 88–73
Rakeem Buckles scored 17 points and four teammates added double-figures to lead host Louisville to an 88–73 victory over #16/18 Butler in the opening game of the new KFC Yum! Center on Tuesday, Nov. 16. The loss dropped Butler to 1–1 on the young season.

11/13 – Butler vs Ball State

Team	1st Half	2nd Half	Final
BSU	20	35	55
BU	38	50	88

Butler Rolls To Big Win Over Ball State
Shelvin Mack scored a game-high 19 points and teammate Matt Howard added a double-double to lead #16/18 Butler to an 88–55 victory over visiting Ball State in a non-league game at Hinkle Fieldhouse on Saturday, Nov. 20. The win lifted to Bulldogs to 2–1 on the young season.

11/16 – Butler at Siena

Team	1st Half	2nd Half	Final
SIE	29	28	57
BU	37	33	70

Bench Lifts Butler To 70–57 Win At Siena
Senior Matt Howard posted his second consecutive double-double and Butler picked up a big lift from the bench in a 70–57 victory over Siena in a non-league game at Times Union Center on Tuesday, Nov. 23. It was Butler's second straight win and lifted the Bulldogs to 3–1 on the young season.

11/27 – Butler vs Evansville

Team	1st Half	2nd Half	OT	Final
EVV	29	32	10	71
BU	36	25	7	68

Bulldogs Lose In Overtime To Evansville, 71–68
Forward Denver Holmes hit a clutch three-point field goal with 0:18 left in overtime to lift visiting Evansville to a 71–68 victory over Butler in a non-league game at Hinkle Fieldhouse on Saturday, Nov. 27. The loss, Butler's first at home in the past 18 games, left the Bulldogs at 3–2 on the young season.

12/1 – Butler at Loyola

Team	1st Half	2nd Half	Final
L-IL	28	35	63
BU	38	27	65

Bulldogs Hold Off Loyola, 65–63
Senior Zach Hahn hit a pair of clutch free throws with seven seconds remaining and Butler handed host Loyola its first 2010–11 loss, 65–63, in the Horizon League opener for both teams at the Joseph J. Gentile Center on Wednesday, Dec. 1.

12/4 – Butler vs. Duke

Team	1st Half	2nd Half	Final
DUKE	33	49	82
BU	33	37	70

Butler Fall To Top-Ranked Duke, 82–70
Senior Kyle Singler sparked an 11–0 run midway through the second half that lifted No. 1 Duke to an 82–70 victory over Butler in the Carquest Auto Parts Classic at the IZOD Center in East Rutherford, N.J. The nationally televised game was a rematch of last spring's NCAA Division I Championship game.

12/9 – Butler at Xavier

Team	1st Half	2nd Half	Final
XAV	32	19	51
BU	24	25	49

Xavier Edges Butler, 51–49
Guard Mark Lyons made two free throws with 0:03.4 left on the clock to lift host Xavier to a 51–49 victory over Butler in a non-league game at the Cintas Center on Thursday (Dec. 9). The loss was Butler's second straight and third in the last four games.

12/11 – Butler vs. Mississippi Valley State

Team	1st Half	2nd Half	Final
MVSU	25	46	71
BU	48	43	91

Bulldogs Roll Past Mississippi Valley State
Senior Matt Howard scored a season-high 26 points and sparked Butler to a 91–71 victory over visiting Mississippi Valley State in a non-league game at Hinkle Fieldhouse on Saturday, Dec. 11. The win snapped the Bulldogs’ two-game skid.

12/18 – Butler vs Stanford

Team	1st Half	2nd Half	Final
STAN	22	28	50
BU	41	42	83

Bulldogs Cruise Past Stanford, 83–50
Senior Matt Howard posted his fourth double-double of the season and Butler cruised to an 83–50 victory over visiting Stanford in a non-league game at Hinkle Fieldhouse on Saturday, Dec. 18. The victory, which was nationally televised on CBS, lifted the Bulldogs to 6–4 on the young season.

12/22 – Butler vs Utah
Diamond Head Classic Opening Round

Team	1st Half	2nd Half	Final
UTAH	27	35	62
BU	40	34	74

Bulldogs Hold On Against Utah, 74–62
Senior Matt Howard scored a game-high 23 points and junior Ronald Nored added a career-high 16 points, all in the second half, to lead Butler to a 74–62 victory over Utah in the first round of the Diamond Head Classic at the Stan Sheriff Center on Wednesday, Dec. 22. It was the third straight win for the 7–4 Bulldogs.

12/23 – Butler vs Florida State
Diamond Head Classic Semifinals

Team	1st Half	2nd Half	Final
FSU	19	45	64
BU	21	46	67

Bulldogs Edge Florida State, 67–64
Junior Shelvin Mack scored all of his 17 points in the second half to help Butler hold on to a 67–64 victory over Florida State in the semifinals of the 2010 Diamond Head Classic at the Stan Sheriff Center on Thursday, Dec. 23. The win sends the Bulldogs into the title game against Washington State on Christmas Day.

12/25 – Butler vs Washington State
Diamond Head Classic Championship

Team	1st Half	2nd Half	Final
WSU	38	30	68
BU	40	44	84

Bulldogs Win Diamond Head Classic
The Butler men's basketball team is coming home from sunny Hawaii with a tournament championship. The Bulldogs buried a barrage of 3-pointers en route to an 84–68 win over Washington State in the title game of the Diamond Head Classic.

1/1 – Butler vs Valparaiso

Team	1st Half	2nd Half	Final
VALPO	25	34	59
BU	36	40	76

Butler Pulls Away From Valparaiso, 76–59
Junior Shelvin Mack led a balanced attack with 16 points and Butler used a strong closing run to defeat visiting Valparaiso, 76–59, in a feature Horizon League game at Hinkle Fieldhouse on New Year's Day. The win was Butler's sixth straight and lifted the Bulldogs to 10–4 on the season and 2–0 in league play.

1/3 – Butler at Milwaukee

Team	1st Half	2nd Half	Final
MILW	37	39	76
BU	29	23	52

Milwaukee Overpowers Butler, 76–52
Forwards Anthony Hill and Tony Meier combined for 42 points and guard Kaylon Williams added a triple-double to help host Milwaukee cruise to a 76–52 victory over Butler at U. S. Cellular Arena on Monday, Jan. 3. It was Butler's biggest margin of defeat in more than five seasons.

1/7 – Butler vs Cleveland State

Team	1st Half	2nd Half	Final
CLEV	23	33	56
BU	42	37	79

Butler Rolls Over Cleveland State, 79–56
Sophomore Andrew Smith made the most of his first career appearance against Cleveland State, finishing with his first career double-double and leading Butler to a convincing, 79–56, victory over the league-leading Vikings at Hinkle Fieldhouse on Friday, Jan. 7. The win helped lift the Bulldogs into a four-way tie for second place in the Horizon League.

1/9 – Butler vs Youngstown

Team	1st Half	2nd Half	Final
YSU	37	42	79
BU	41	43	84

Butler Survives Hot-Shooting Youngstown State, 84–79
Junior Shelvin Mack scored a career-high 28 points and senior Matt Howard added 26 to help Butler hold off a hot-shooting Youngstown State team, 84–79, at Hinkle Fieldhouse on Sunday, Jan. 9. The victory lifted Butler into a share of first place in the Horizon League.

1/14 – Butler at Detroit

Team	1st Half	2nd Half	Final
DET	20	44	64
BU	42	45	87

Butler Rolls Over Detroit, 87–64
Senior Matt Howard led five Butler players in double-figures with 17 points and the Bulldogs pulled away to an 87–64 victory over Detroit in a first place showdown at Calihan Hall on Friday, Jan. 14. The 23-point win left the Bulldogs tied with Valparaiso for the top spot in the league.

1/16 – Butler at Wright State

Team	1st Half	2nd Half	Final
WRST	34	35	69
BU	34	30	64

Wright State Takes 69–64 Decision From Bulldogs
A three-point field goal attempt to tie the game by Butler's Shelvin Mack with 0:06 remaining hit the back of the rim and the front of the rim twice, before popping out, and host Wright State held on to hand the Bulldogs a 69–64 setback at the Nutter Center on Sunday (Jan. 16) evening.

1/21 – Butler vs Green Bay

Team	1st Half	2nd Half	Final
GB	32	43	75
BU	40	41	81

Bulldogs Hold Off Green Bay, 81–75
Senior Matt Howard turned in the best overall performance of his Butler career and the Bulldogs held off a late charge by visiting Green Bay to post an 81–75 Horizon League win at Hinkle Fieldhouse on Friday (Jan. 21). The win helped the Bulldogs maintain a share of second place in the league standings.

1/23 – Butler vs Milwaukee

Team	1st Half	2nd Half	OT	Final
MILW	32	40	14	86
BU	37	35	8	80

Bulldogs Fall In Overtime To Milwaukee, 86–80
Visiting Milwaukee turned a 13–4 scoring run in overtime into an 86–80 victory over Butler in a rematch at Hinkle Fieldhouse on Sunday (Jan. 23) afternoon. The loss kept Butler from gaining a share of first place in the Horizon League.

1/29 – Butler at Valparaiso

Team	1st Half	2nd Half	OT	Final
VALP	26	41	18	85
BU	31	36	12	79

Butler Falls In Overtime At Valparaiso, 85–79
Host Valparaiso hit five of seven shots, including two from beyond the three-point arc, and pulled away to an 85–79 victory over Butler in a key Horizon League showdown at the Athletics-Recreation Center on Saturday, Jan. 29. The win lifted the Crusaders into a share of first place in the league, while Butler slipped to fourth.

2/3 – Butler at Youngstown

Team	1st Half	2nd Half	Final
YSU	25	37	62
BU	22	38	60

Youngstown State Upsets Butler, 62–60
Freshman Kendrick Perry capped a 10–0 closing run with a three-point field goal to lift host Youngstown State to a 62–60 victory over Butler at the Beeghly Center on Thursday, Feb. 3. The loss was Butler's third straight and dropped the Bulldogs to 14–9 on the season and 6–5 in the Horizon League.

2/5 – Butler at Cleveland

Team	1st Half	2nd Half	Final
CLEV	29	32	61
BU	33	40	73

Bulldogs Upend Cleveland State, 73–61
Senior Matt Howard led five players in double figures and Butler pulled away in the second half to defeat league-leading Cleveland State, 73–61, at the Wolstein Center on Saturday, Feb. 5. The win snapped Butler's three-game losing skid and gave the Bulldogs a season sweep of the first place Vikings.

2/7 – Butler vs UIC

Team	1st Half	2nd Half	Final
UIC	33	32	65
BU	34	38	72

Bulldogs Hold Off UIC, 72–65
Butler overcame the loss of its leading scorer and rebounder and an early second half deficit to hand visiting UIC a 72–65 setback in a hard-fought Horizon League game at Hinkle Fieldhouse on Monday, Feb. 7. The win lifted the Bulldogs into a tie for fourth place in the league standings.

2/10 – Butler vs Wright State

Team	1st Half	2nd Half	Final
WRST	34	29	63
BU	39	32	71

Bulldogs Knock Off Wright State, 71–63
Playing without leading scorer and rebounder Matt Howard, Butler pulled together one of its best shooting performances of the season and handed visiting Wright State at 71–63 setback in a key Horizon League game at Hinkle Fieldhouse on Thursday (Feb. 10). The win was Butler's third straight and lifted the Bulldogs to 17–9 on the season and 9–5 in league play.

2/12 – Butler vs Detroit

Team	1st Half	2nd Half	Final
DET	34	17	51
BU	29	37	66

Second Half Lifts Butler Past Detroit, 66–51
Junior Shelvin Mack single-handedly out-scored visiting Detroit in the final 20 minutes and Butler pulled away to a 66–51 Horizon League victory at Hinkle Fieldhouse on Saturday (Feb. 12). The win was Butler's fourth straight and lifted the Bulldogs into a tie for third place in the league standings.

2/15 – Butler at Green Bay

Team	1st Half	2nd Half	Final
GB	28	34	62
BU	34	30	64

Butler Edges Green Bay, 64–62
Senior Matt Howard's slam dunk with 0:01.8 left on the clock lifted visiting Butler to a 64–62 victory over Green Bay in a Horizon League game at the Resch Center on Tuesday (Feb. 15). The win was Butler's fifth straight and boosted the Bulldogs into third place in the league standings.

2/19 – Butler at UIC

Team	1st Half	2nd Half	Final
UIC	27	25	52
BU	40	39	79

Butler Rolls At UIC, 79–52
Senior Matt Howard led four Butler players in double-figures and the Bulldogs used a strong finish to the first half to pull away from host UIC and post a 79–52 victory at the UIC Pavilion on Saturday, Feb. 19. The win was Butler's sixth straight and gave the Bulldogs a sixth consecutive 20-win season.

2/26 – Butler vs Loyola

Team	1st Half	2nd Half	Final
L-IL	26	30	56
BU	32	31	63

Butler Clinches Record Fifth Straight League Title
Junior Shelvin Mack scored a game-high 18 points and Butler rallied in the absence of head coach Brad Stevens to defeat Loyola, 63–56, in a key Horizon League game at Hinkle Fieldhouse on Saturday. The win, Butler's seventh straight, gave the Bulldogs a share of a league-record fifth straight Horizon League title.

== Postseason ==
=== Postseason awards ===
#	Name	Class	Award
Head Coach	Brad Stevens	4th	Coach Clair Bee Award Winner
54	Matt Howard	Sr.	All-Horizon League First Team; Horizon League All-Defensive Team; Academic All-American – First Team; Academic All-American of the Year; Horizon League All-Tournament Team; Horizon League Tournament MVP; Elite 88 Award Winner; Lou Henson All-America Team; Lou Henson Award Winner; NCAA All-Tournament Team; Eddie Sutton Tustenugee Award Winner; Cecil Coleman Medal of Honor Recipient
1	Shelvin Mack	Jr.	All-Horizon League Second Team; Horizon League All-Tournament Team; NCAA Southeastern Region MVP; Lou Henson All-America Team; NCAA All-Tournament Team
5	Ronald Nored	Jr.	Horizon League All-Defensive Team
2	Shawn Vanzant	Sr.	Horizon League All-Tournament Team

=== Postseason game capsules ===
3/5 – Butler vs Cleveland State
Horizon League Tournament Semifinal

Team	1st Half	2nd Half	Final
CLEV	35	33	68
BU	41	35	76

Vanzant Leads Butler To Horizon League Title Game
Senior Shawn Vanzant scored all his team-high 18 points in the final 13 minutes of the game to help lead Butler past Cleveland State, 76–68, in the semifinals of the 2011 Horizon League Men's Basketball Championship at U. S. Cellular Arena in Milwaukee, Wis., on Saturday (March 5). The win sends Butler to a league-record sixth straight tournament championship game.

3/8 – Butler vs Milwaukee
Horizon League tournament championship

Team	1st Half	2nd Half	Final
MILW	20	24	44
BU	33	26	59

Defense Lifts Butler To League Crown
Senior Matt Howard scored a game-high 18 points and Butler used a rock-solid defensive effort to defeat top-seeded Milwaukee, 59–44, in the title game of the 2011 Horizon League Men's Basketball Championship at U. S. Cellular Arena on Tuesday, March 8.

3/17 – Butler vs Old Dominion
NCAA second round (round of 64)

Team	1st Half	2nd Half	Final
ODU	29	28	58
BU	27	33	60

Howard Lifts Butler Over Old Dominion
Forward Matt Howard hit a lay-up with less than a second remaining to lift Butler to a 60–58 victory over Old Dominion in the second round of the 2011 NCAA Men's Basketball Championship at the Verizon Center on Thursday (March 17). The win advances the Bulldogs to the third round of the tournament on Saturday (March 19).

3/19 – Butler vs #4 Pittsburgh
NCAA Third round (round of 32)

Team	1st Half	2nd Half	Final
PITT	30	40	70
BU	38	33	71

Bulldogs Heading To Sweet 16
For the fourth time in nine years, the Butler men's basketball team is going to the Sweet 16. The Bulldogs picked up their 11th straight win Saturday night, winning in the final second for the second time in three days.

3/24 – Butler vs #16 Wisconsin
NCAA Sweet Sixteen

Team	1st Half	2nd Half	Final
WIS	24	30	54
BU	33	28	61

Bulldogs Win, Move To Elite Eight
For the second time in school history, Butler men's basketball has advanced to the Elite 8. Senior Matt Howard scored 20 points and junior Shelvin Mack added 13 in a 61–54 win over Wisconsin in the NCAA Southeast Regional semifinal Thursday night in New Orleans Arena. BU will play Florida Saturday with a Final Four berth on the line.

3/26 – Butler vs #13 Florida
NCAA Elite Eight

Team	1st Half	2nd Half	OT	Final
FLA	33	27	11	71
BU	32	28	14	74

The Butler men's basketball team qualified for the NCAA Final Four in Houston for the second consecutive year.

4/2 – Butler vs Virginia Commonwealth
NCAA Final Four

Team	1st Half	2nd Half	Final
VCU	28	34	62
BU	34	36	70

DAWGS BEAT VCU, ADVANCE TO NATIONAL TITLE GAME
The Bulldogs’ tourney run to Houston would last one more game. Butler was back in the NCAA national final, on his way to a 70–62 win over VCU in the Final Four.

4/4 – Butler vs #9 Connecticut
NCAA Championship Game

Team	1st Half	2nd Half	Final
UCONN	19	34	53
BU	22	19	41

Bulldogs Finish As National Runner-up
For the second consecutive year, the Butler men's basketball team is the national runner-up. Connecticut held the Bulldogs to 18.8 percent shooting and the Huskies defeated BU in the NCAA national title game, 53–41. Butler finishes the year 28–10.

== See also ==
- 2011 NCAA Division I men's basketball tournament
