= 2012 NBA Development League draft =

General information
- Sport: Basketball
- Date: November 2, 2012
- Location: via Cisco WebEx

Overview
- League: NBA
- First selection: JaJuan Johnson, Fort Wayne Mad Ants

The 2012 NBA Development League draft was the 12th draft of the National Basketball Association Development League (NBDL). The draft was held on November 2, 2012, before the 2012–13 season. In this draft, all 16 of the league's teams took turns selecting eligible players.

JaJuan Johnson was the first overall draft pick. In 2011–12 he had played for the Boston Celtics after being selected in the 2011 NBA draft. He became the second "Johnson" taken number one overall in the NBDL's after Ken Johnson was chosen in 2003. The first non-American selected was Christian Eyenga, who was taken eighth by the Texas Legends. Ten players had also been selected previously in an NBA draft – JaJuan Johnson, Andrew Goudelock, Justin Harper, Shelvin Mack, Shan Foster, Christian Eyenga, Jack McClinton, Travis Leslie, DeVon Hardin, and Sean Singletary.

Although some of the players chosen in the 2012 NBA Development League Draft had played semi-professional and/or professional basketball after college graduation, only the United States colleges they attended are listed.

== Key ==
Pos.	G	F	C
Position	Guard	Forward	Center

^	Denotes player who has been selected to (an) NBA Development League All-Star Game(s)
*	Denotes player who has been selected to (an) NBA Development League All-Star Game(s) and was also selected in an NBA draft
†	Denotes player who was also selected in an NBA Draft

== Draft ==
Round	Pick	Player	Position	Nationality	Team	College
1	1	JaJuan Johnson^{†}	F	United States	Fort Wayne Mad Ants	Purdue
1	2	Andrew Goudelock^{†}	G	United States	Sioux Falls Skyforce	College of Charleston
1	3	Justin Harper^{†}	G	United States	Idaho Stampede	Richmond
1	4	Shelvin Mack^{†}	G	United States	Maine Red Claws	Butler
1	5	Mike Davis	F	United States	Reno Bighorns	Illinois
1	6	Dominique Sutton	F	United States	Tulsa 66ers	North Carolina Central
1	7	Chris Davis	F	United States	Rio Grande Valley Vipers	Dayton
1	8	Christian Eyenga^{†}	G/F	DR Congo	Texas Legends	—
1	9	Justin Hurtt	G	United States	Iowa Energy	Tulsa
1	10	D'Aundray Brown	G	United States	Canton Charge	Cleveland State
1	11	Shan Foster^{†}	G/F	United States	Bakersfield Jam	Vanderbilt
1	12	Jack McClinton^{†}	G	United States	Erie BayHawks	Miami (FL)
1	13	Travis Leslie^{†}	G	United States	Santa Cruz Warriors	Georgia
1	14	Tim Ohlbrecht	F/C	Germany	Springfield Armor	—
1	15	Toure' Murry	G	United States	Austin Toros	Wichita State
1	16	Dairese Gary	G	United States	Los Angeles D-Fenders	New Mexico
2	17	Kenny Lawson	C	United States	Iowa Energy	Creighton
2	18	Mark Tyndale	G	United States	Sioux Falls Skyforce	Temple
2	19	Ryan Rossiter	F	United States	Canton Charge	Siena
2	20	Dominic Cheek	G	United States	Fort Wayne Mad Ants	Villanova
2	21	Demonte Harper	G	United States	Reno Bighorns	Morehead State
2	22	Travis Hyman	C	United States	Tulsa 66ers	Bowie State
2	23	DeVon Hardin^{†}	C	United States	Rio Grande Valley Vipers	California
2	24	Sean Singletary^{†}	G	United States	Texas Legends	Virginia
2	25	Terrence Jennings	F/C	United States	Iowa Energy	Louisville
2	26	Jorge Gutierrez	G	United States	Canton Charge	California
2	27	James Nunnally	G/F	United States	Bakersfield Jam	Santa Barbara
2	28	Alex Ruoff	G	United States	Erie BayHawks	West Virginia
2	29	Christian Polk	G	United States	Springfield Armor	UTEP
2	30	Willie Reed	F	United States	Springfield Armor	Saint Louis
2	31	Chris Cooper	F	United States	Bakersfield Jam	Old Dominion
2	32	Tony Taylor	G	United States	Tulsa 66ers	George Washington
3	33	T. J. Robinson	F	United States	Santa Cruz Warriors	Long Beach State
3	34	Mike Singletary	F	United States	Rio Grande Valley Vipers	Texas Tech
3	35	Garrett Green	F/C	United States	Idaho Stampede	San Diego State
3	36	Shay Shine	G	United States	Texas Legends	High Point
3	37	Brandon Bowdry	G/F	United States	Erie BayHawks	Eastern Michigan
3	38	Cam Tatum	G/F	United States	Iowa Energy	Tennessee
3	39	Matt Dickey	G	United States	Rio Grande Valley Vipers	UNC Asheville
3	40	J. P. Primm	G	United States	Canton Charge	UNC Asheville
3	41	George Odufuwa	F/C	United States; Nigeria	Iowa Energy	North Texas
3	42	Lenny Daniel	F	United States	Fort Wayne Mad Ants	Cal State Northridge
3	43	Ralph Sampson III	C	United States	Reno Bighorns	Minnesota
3	44	LaMarcus Lowe	F/C	United States	Erie BayHawks	Detroit
3	45	Faisal Aden	G	United States	Santa Cruz Warriors	Washington State
3	46	Cliff Tucker	G/F	United States	Springfield Armor	Maryland
3	47	Andrew Lovedale	F	Nigeria	Austin Toros	Davidson
3	48	Phil Martin	G	United States	Iowa Energy	UC Riverside
4	49	Darryl Partin	G	United States	Fort Wayne Mad Ants	Boston University
4	50	Ralph Mims	G	United States	Iowa Energy	Florida State
4	51	Hank Thorns	G	United States	Idaho Stampede	TCU
4	52	Omar Reed	F	United States	Maine Red Claws	Bluefield College
4	53	Arinze Onuaku	F/C	United States	Reno Bighorns	Syracuse
4	54	Ron Anderson	F	United States	Tulsa 66ers	South Florida
4	55	Glen Rice Jr.	G	United States	Rio Grande Valley Vipers	Georgia Tech
4	56	Darryl Bryant	G	United States	Texas Legends	West Virginia
4	57	Liam McMorrow	C	Canada	Iowa Energy	Tennessee Tech
4	58	Malik Cooke	F	United States	Erie BayHawks	South Carolina
4	59	Cervante Burrell	G	United States	Maine Red Claws	Seattle
4	60	Darnell Dodson	G/F	United States	Fort Wayne Mad Ants	Southern Miss
4	61	Durrell Summers	G	United States	Santa Cruz Warriors	Michigan State
4	62	Shawn Vanzant	G	United States	Springfield Armor	Butler
4	63	Maurice McNeil	F	United States	Austin Toros	Houston
4	64	Rashad Bishop	F	United States	Los Angeles D-Fenders	Cincinnati
5	65	Bernard Toombs	C	United States	Fort Wayne Mad Ants	Troy
5	66	Chris Davis	G	United States	Sioux Falls Skyforce	Southern
5	67	Sean Evans	F	United States	Idaho Stampede	St. John's
5	68	Jeremiah Rivers	G	United States	Maine Red Claws	Indiana
5	69	Reggie Willhite	G/F	United States	Reno Bighorns	Yale
5	70	Rodney Bartholomew	F	United States	Tulsa 66ers	Indiana Tech
5	71	Dominique Ferguson	F	United States	Rio Grande Valley Vipers	Florida International
5	72	Jefferson Mason	G	United States	Texas Legends	Minnesota State–Mankato
5	73	Mike Smith	G/F	United States	Iowa Energy	East Tennessee State
5	74	Omari Johnson	F	Jamaica	Canton Charge	Oregon State
5	75	Austen Powers	F	United States	Bakersfield Jam	Seattle
5	76	Ronnie Moss	G	United States	Erie BayHawks	Texas Wesleyan
5	77	Steve Tchiengang	F	Cameroon	Santa Cruz Warriors	Vanderbilt
5	78	Shawn Taggart	F	United States	Springfield Armor	Memphis
5	79	Alexis Wangmene	F	Cameroon	Austin Toros	Texas
5	80	Phil Jones	C	U.S. Virgin Islands	Los Angeles D-Fenders	Charlotte
6	81	Jason Warren	G/F	United States	Fort Wayne Mad Ants	Missouri Western State
6	82	Malcolm Campbell	F/C	United States	Sioux Falls Skyforce	Warner
6	83	Jai Lucas	G	United States	Idaho Stampede	Texas
6	84	Ronald Allen	F	United States	Maine Red Claws	Cincinnati
6	85	Dontell Jefferson	G	United States	Reno Bighorns	Arkansas
6	86	Solomon Bozeman	G	United States	Tulsa 66ers	Arkansas–Little Rock
6	87	Tajuan Porter	G	United States	Rio Grande Valley Vipers	Oregon
6	88	Marcus Simmons	G	United States	Texas Legends	Southern California
6	89	Vance Cooksey	G	United States	Iowa Energy	Pikeville
6	90	Assane Sene	C	Senegal	Canton Charge	Virginia
6	91	Bo Ingram	F	United States	Bakersfield Jam	Texas–Arlington
6	92	Donte Roberts	C	United States	Erie BayHawks	Lewis–Clark State
6	93	Darren Moore	G	United States	Santa Cruz Warriors	UC Irvine
6	94	Stefan Bonneau	G	United States	Springfield Armor	LIU C.W. Post
6	95	Jazwyn Cowan	F	United States	Austin Toros	Hampton
6	96	Tristan Thompson	G	United States	Los Angeles D-Fenders	North Texas
7	97	Dante Williams	G	United States	Fort Wayne Mad Ants	East Tennessee State
7	98	Michael Nunnally	F	United States	Sioux Falls Skyforce	Pacific
7	99	Malik Alvin	G	United States	Idaho Stampede	Shaw
7	100	Scott VanderMeer	C	United States	Maine Red Claws	UIC
7	101	Chris Telesford	G/F	United States	Reno Bighorns	Columbus State
7	102	Ayron Hardy	F	United States	Tulsa 66ers	Jacksonville
7	103	Lamb Autrey	G	United States	Reno Bighorns	St. Mary's (Texas)
7	104	Billy McShepard	F	United States	Texas Legends	Valdosta State
7	105	Patrick Richard	G/F	United States	Iowa Energy	McNeese State
7	106	Jordan Eglseder	C	United States	Canton Charge	Northern Iowa
7	107	Trevor Harmon	G	United States	Bakersfield Jam	Cleveland State
7	108	Carlton Guyton	G	United States	Erie BayHawks	Kent State
7	109	Japeth Aguilar	F	Philippines	Santa Cruz Warriors	Western Kentucky
7	110	Chaz Crawford	F/C	United States	Springfield Armor	Drexel
7	111	P. J. Alawoya	F	United States; Nigeria	Austin Toros	McNeese State
7	112	Cecil Brown	G	United States	Los Angeles D-Fenders	Santa Barbara
8	113	Bryant Austin	F	United States	Fort Wayne Mad Ants	Indiana Tech
8	114	Travis Cohn	G	United States	Sioux Falls Skyforce	Jacksonville
8	115	Haruona Mutombo	G	Canada	Idaho Stampede	Western Carolina
8	116	Corey Allmond	G	United States	Maine Red Claws	Sam Houston State
8	117	Brant Bailey	F	United States	Reno Bighorns	Wisconsin–Stevens Point
8	118	Isaiah Wilkerson	G/F	United States	Tulsa 66ers	NJIT
8	119	Evan Matteson	C	United States	Rio Grande Valley Vipers	Texas A&M International
8	120	Kenny Dobbs	F	United States	Texas Legends	—
8	121	Mamadou Diarra	C	Mali	Los Angeles D-Fenders	Chaminade
8	122	Vernon Lewis	F	United States	Canton Charge	Paul Quinn College
8	123	Jamel McGuire	G	United States	Bakersfield Jam	Cal State San Marcos
8	124	Danny Sumner	F	United States	Erie BayHawks	William & Mary
8	125	Arron Mollet	G	United States	Santa Cruz Warriors	Notre Dame de Namur
8	126	Nate Brown	G	United States	Springfield Armor	Saint Peter's
8	127	Justin R. Johnson	G/F	United States	Austin Toros	Iowa
8	128	Eniel Polynice	G	United States; Haiti	Los Angeles D-Fenders	Seton Hall
