= Hibernia Basketball =

Irish basketball team

- Leagues: FIBA Europe Cup
- Founded: 2015
- Dissolved: 2016
- Arena: National Basketball Arena
- Capacity: 2,500
- Location: Tallaght, South Dublin, Ireland
- Head coach: Colin O'Reilly
- Ownership: Basketball Ireland
| Home | Away |

Hibernia Basketball was an Irish basketball team, created by Basketball Ireland to participate in the 2015–16 FIBA Europe Cup. The team's home arena was the National Basketball Arena, based in Tallaght, South Dublin, and the playing roster consisted of Premier League players. The team made its debut on 28 October 2015 against Danish club Bakken Bears, losing 96–60. They finished the tournament with a winless 0–6 record, finishing last in Group F and earning a tournament-worst point difference figure of 243 (345 points for, 588 against).

== Roster ==
Hibernia roster
Players
Coaches

| Pos. | No. | Nat. | Name | Ht. |
|---|---|---|---|---|
| SG | 4 | (Ireland) | O'Sullivan, Adrian | 1.80 m (5 ft 11 in) |
| PG | 5 | (Ireland) | Hosford, Kyle | 1.75 m (5 ft 9 in) |
| PG | 6 | (Ireland) | Downey, Roy | 1.91 m (6 ft 3 in) |
| SG | 7 | (Ireland) | O'Sullivan, Ciaran | 1.93 m (6 ft 4 in) |
| SF | 8 | (Ireland) | Lyons, Patrick | 1.87 m (6 ft 2 in) |
| SG | 9 | (Ireland) | Cunningham, Dylan | 1.95 m (6 ft 5 in) |
| SF | 10 | (Ireland) | Lacey, Kevin | 1.92 m (6 ft 4 in) |
| SF | 11 | (Ireland) | Thompson, Luke | 1.90 m (6 ft 3 in) |
| SF | 12 | (Ireland) | O'Reilly, Colin | 2.00 m (6 ft 7 in) |
| C | 13 | (Latvia) | Provizors, Martins | 2.02 m (6 ft 8 in) |
| PF | 14 | (Ireland) | Grace, Conor | 2.10 m (6 ft 11 in) |
| PF | 15 | (United States) | Colbert, Lehmon | 2.00 m (6 ft 7 in) |
| PF | 23 | (Ireland) | Cairns, Keelan | 2.10 m (6 ft 11 in) |
| PG | 32 | (United States) | Vanzant, Shawn | 1.83 m (6 ft 0 in) |
| SF | 33 | (Ireland) | O'Sullivan, Ronan | 1.90 m (6 ft 3 in) |
| C | | (Ireland) | Killeen, Jason | 2.10 m (6 ft 11 in) |

Head coach

- (Republic of Ireland) Colin O'Reilly

Assistant coach(es)

- (Republic of Ireland) Mark Scannell
- (Republic of Ireland) James Weldon
- (Republic of Ireland) Puff Summers

Legend

- (C) Team captain
- (DP) Development player
- (I) Import player
- Injured

- Roster
Updated: 2015-12-03
