= DeVon Hardin =

American basketball player (born 1986)

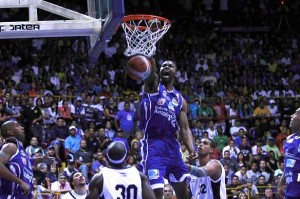

Personal information
- Born: August 7, 1986 (age 40) Long Beach, California, U.S.
- Listed height: 6 ft 11 in (2.11 m)
- Listed weight: 235 lb (107 kg)

Career information
- High school: Newark Memorial (Newark, California)
- College: California (2004–2008)
- NBA draft: 2008: 2nd round, 50th overall pick
- Drafted by: Seattle SuperSonics
- Playing career: 2008–2015
- Position: Power forward / center

Career history
- 2009: Aigaleo
- 2009: Henan Jiyuan
- 2009–2010: Tulsa 66ers
- 2010–2011: Elitzur Yavne
- 2011: Gaziantep BB
- 2011: BC Minsk-2006
- 2011–2012: Ciclista Olímpico
- 2012: Marinos de Anzoátegui
- 2012: Al Rayyan
- 2012: Hong Kong Bulls
- 2012–2013: Rio Grande Valley Vipers
- 2013–2014: Basquete Cearense
- 2014–2015: Paulistano
- 2015: Barako Bull Energy

Career highlights
- Brazilian All-Star Slam Dunk champion (2014)
- Stats at Basketball Reference

DeVon Michael Hardin (born August 7, 1986) is an American former professional basketball player. A 6 ft 11 in (2.11 m), 235 lb (107 kg; 16.8 st) forward-center, Hardin was selected in the 2008 NBA draft as the 50th overall pick by the Seattle SuperSonics.

== High school career ==
Hardin played at Newark Memorial High School in Newark, California. He averaged 12.9 ppg, 11.4 rpg and 4.4 bpg as a senior, earning first-team All-Metro honors from the San Francisco Chronicle.

Considered a three-star recruit by Rivals.com, Hardin was listed as the No. 23 power forward and the No. 89 player in the nation in 2004.

== College career ==
Hardin attended the University of California, Berkeley, where he played all of his four collegiate seasons for the Golden Bears and majored in social welfare. He declared for the 2007 NBA draft, but withdrew his name shortly before the event.

== Professional career ==
Hardin was selected 50th overall in the 2008 NBA draft by the Seattle SuperSonics, but suffered a stress fracture in his left tibia and was unable to participate in training camp. In January 2009, he joined Greek first division club Aigaleo, as a replacement for Andrae Patterson. Hardin had recently been released by Turkish team Mersin BB, after failing to properly recover from the stress fracture.

Hardin's draft rights, along with Chris Wilcox and Joe Smith, were traded to the New Orleans Hornets for Tyson Chandler on February 17, 2009. However, the trade was rescinded a day later, after Chandler failed his physical with the Thunder.

He played for the Philadelphia 76ers in the Orlando Pro Summer League in 2010. On August 1, 2010, Hardin signed with Elitzur Yavne in the second division in Israel.

For the 2011 season he began with Minsk 2006 in Belarus, then he signed with Marinos in Puerto la Cruz Venezuela.

On October 20, 2014, he was signed by Brazilian club Paulistano.

On April 5, 2015, Hardin signed with Barako Bull Energy of the Philippine Basketball Association for the PBA Governors' Cup.

== Transactions ==
- June 26, 2008: Selected by the Seattle SuperSonics/Oklahoma City Thunder in the second round (50th overall) of the 2008 NBA draft.
- August 6, 2008: Signed by Mersin Büyükşehir Belediyesi S.K. (Turkish Basketball League).
- September 12, 2008: Released by Mersin.
- January 18, 2009: Signed by Egaleo BC (B Ethniki).
- December 1, 2009: Signed by Tulsa 66ers (NBA Development League).
- December 18, 2009: Waived by Tulsa due to injury.
- December 19, 2009: Re-acquired by Tulsa.
- September 15, 2010: Signed by Elitzur Yavne (Liga Leumit).
- March 1, 2011: Signed by Gaziantep BB (Turkish Basketball League) from Elitzur Yavne.
- October 4, 2011: Signed by BC Minsk-2006 (Belarusian Premier League) from Gaziantep.
- December 24, 2011: Released by BC Minsk-2006.
- December 28, 2011: Signed by Ciclista Olímpico (LNB Argentina).
- January 24, 2012: Released by Olimpico.
- January 25, 2012: Signed by Marinos de Anzoátegui (LPB Venezuela).
- March 8, 2012: Released by Marinos.
- March 22, 2012: Signed by Al Rayyan (Qatari Basketball League).
- April 25, 2012: Signed by Hong Kong Bulls (NBL China).
- June 15, 2012: Released by Hong Kong.
- November 2, 2012: Selected in the second round (23rd overall) of the 2012 NBA Development League Draft by the Rio Grande Valley Vipers.
- January 2013: Waived by Rio Grande Valley Vipers
- August, 2013: Signed by Basquete Cearense (NBB Brazil).
- October, 2014: Signed by Paulistano (NBB Brazil).
