= Shawn Vanzant =

American basketball player and coach

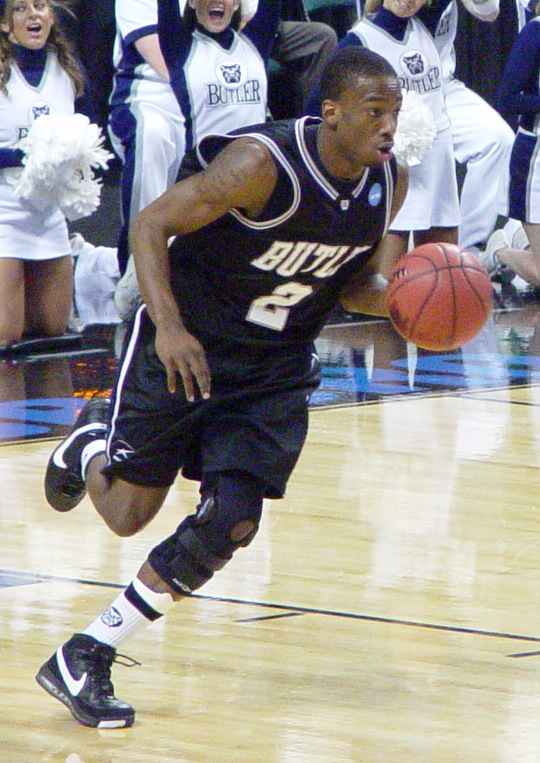
- Vanzant with Butler in 2009

Lincoln Memorial Railsplitters
- Title: Assistant coach
- League: South Atlantic Conference

Personal information
- Born: October 19, 1988 (age 38)

Career information
- High school: Wharton (New Tampa, Florida)
- College: Butler (2007–2011)
- NBA draft: 2011: undrafted
- Playing career: 2011–2017
- Position: Point guard
- Coaching career: 2017–present

Career history

Playing
- 2011–2012: Korihait
- 2012: Ura Basket
- 2012–2013: Springfield Armor
- 2013: Tampa Bay Rebels
- 2013–2014: Island Storm
- 2014–2015: Moncton Miracles
- 2015–2016: Belfast Star
- 2015: →Hibernia
- 2016: Moncton Miracles

Coaching
- 2017–present: Lincoln Memorial (assistant)

Career highlights
- Premier League All-Star First Pick (2016)

Shawn Vincent Vanzant (born October 19, 1988) is an American college basketball coach and former professional basketball player who last played for the Moncton Miracles of the National Basketball League of Canada (NBL). He played college basketball for Butler University before playing professionally in Finland, Canada, Ireland, and the NBA Development League.

== High school career ==
Vanzant attended Wharton High School in New Tampa, Florida where he became the only player in school history to make the varsity team as a freshman. He scored 1,192 points for his high school career, becoming the first player in school history to score 1,000 career points. As a junior in 2005–06, he averaged 14.7 points and 4.9 assists per game. He earned numerous awards as a senior in 2007–08, leading his team to a 29–2 record, a district championship and the Class 5A regional final while averaging 16.4 points, 4.1 rebounds, 4.4 assists and 3.4 steals per game. Over four seasons at Wharton, he helped the Wildcats encompass a 98–18 overall record.

== College career ==
As a freshman at Butler in 2007–08, Vanzant played sparingly for the Bulldogs, averaging just 8.0 minutes per game while appearing in 33 of the team's 34 games. He averaged one point and one rebound per game.

As a sophomore in 2008–09, Vanzant appeared in 29 games, but missed three straight in February due to a knee injury. Prior to that knee injury, on January 24, he had a career-best game with 20 points and four assists against Milwaukee. On the season, he averaged 3.5 points, 1.7 rebounds and 1.0 assists in 13.3 minutes per game.

As a junior in 2009–10, Vanzant started at point guard in the Bulldogs' first four games before returning to a bench role for the rest of the season. On January 2, he scored a season-high 12 points against Milwaukee. He helped the Bulldogs reach the 2010 National Championship Game, where they were defeated by Duke. He appeared in all 38 games for the team in 2009–10, averaging 2.8 points, 1.7 rebounds and 1.2 assists in 14.6 minutes per game.

As a senior in 2010–11, Vanzant played in all 38 games, including 26 as a starter. In the Bulldogs' second last game of the regular season on March 5 against Cleveland State, he scored a season-high 18 points. He helped the Bulldogs return to the National Championship Game, where they fell short for a second straight year, losing to Connecticut. As a senior, he averaged career-highs in all but one major statistical category, finishing with 8.1 points, 3.4 rebounds and 1.7 assists in 28.6 minutes per game.

=== College statistics ===
Year	Team	GP	GS	MPG	FG%	3P%	FT%	RPG	APG	SPG	BPG	PPG
2007–08	Butler	33	0	8.0	.333	.267	.818	1.0	.5	.3	.0	1.0
2008–09	Butler	29	0	13.3	.356	.289	.634	1.7	1.0	.4	.0	3.5
2009–10	Butler	38	4	14.6	.329	.304	.725	1.7	1.2	.4	.2	2.8
2010–11	Butler	38	26	28.6	.441	.404	.736	3.4	1.7	.8	.1	8.1
Career		138	30	16.6	.397	.344	.714	2.0	1.1	.5	.1	4.0

== Professional career ==
During the 2011–12 season, Vanzant played in Finland for Korihait (15 games) and Ura Basket (one game).

On November 2, 2012, Vanzant was selected by the Springfield Armor in the fourth round of the 2012 NBA Development League Draft. He played in 11 games for Springfield between November 24 and December 31 before being deactivated by the team on January 3, 2013, and then waived outright on March 18. He later played one game for the Tampa Bay Rebels of the Florida Basketball Association.

In October 2013, Vanzant signed with the Island Storm for the 2013–14 NBL Canada season. He helped the Storm reach the Finals, where they lost the series 4–3 to the Windsor Express. In 52 games for the Storm, he averaged 6.7 points, 1.3 rebounds and 2.1 assists per game.

In August 2014, Vanzant re-signed with the Island Storm for the 2014–15 season. He later left the Storm prior to the start of the regular season and signed with the Moncton Miracles on November 4. In 35 games for Moncton, he averaged 14.1 points, 2.7 rebounds, 4.5 assists and 1.2 steals per game.

Vanzant moved to Ireland for the 2015–16 season, signing with Belfast Star of the Irish Premier League. Vanzant had a major impact on the team to begin the season, asserting authority at the point guard position as well as delivering at both ends of the court. He averaged 22.2 points per game over the team's first five games, earning him a call-up to Hibernia to compete in the FIBA Europe Cup. Belfast finished the season in seventh place on the ladder with a 6–12 win/loss record, thus missing out on a playoff berth. In the team's final game of the season on March 5, 2016, Vanzant scored a season-high 37 points against the DCU Saints. He appeared in all 18 games for the club in 2015–16, averaging 24.7 points, 3.4 rebounds, 5.3 assists and 1.7 steals in 33.9 minutes per game.

In March 2016, following the conclusion of the Irish Premier League season, Vanzant returned to Canada and signed with the Moncton Miracles for the rest of the 2015–16 NBL season. In 17 games for Moncton, he averaged 6.5 points, 1.9 rebounds and 2.0 assists per game.
