= Kyle Hosford =

Irish basketball player

UCC Demons
- Position: Point guard
- League: Superleague

Personal information
- Born: 27 June 1989 (age 36) Cork, Ireland
- Listed height: 182 cm (6 ft 0 in)

Career information
- Playing career: 2008–present

Career history
- 2008–2012: UCC Demons
- 2012–2013: Blue Demons
- 2013–2019: UCC Demons
- 2015: →Hibernia
- 2019–2020: Neptune
- 2021–present: UCC Demons

Career highlights
- 4× Irish Super League champion (2009, 2015, 2016, 2025); 3× Irish National Cup champion (2009, 2014, 2015); 3× Irish Champions Trophy champion (2014–2016); Irish Super League All-Star First Team (2015); Irish Super League All-Star Third Team (2023); Basketball Ireland Men's Division One champion (2013); Basketball Ireland Men's Senior National Cup champion (2013)

Kyle Martin Hosford (born 27 June 1989) is an Irish basketball player. He represented the Irish national team between 2015 and 2022.

== Irish League career ==
Between 2008 and 2012, Hosford played for UCC Demons in the Irish Super League. After a season with Demons' Division One team in 2012–13, he returned to the Super League team for the 2013–14 season. During the 2015–16 season, he competed for Hibernia in the FIBA Europe Cup. After UCC Demons withdrew from the Super League in 2019, he joined Neptune for the 2019–20 season. For the 2021–22 season, he re-joined UCC Demons for their return season in the National League Division One.

In the 2024–25 season, Hosford helped UCC Demons win the Super League championship.

== National team career ==
Hosford represented the Irish national team at the 2016 FIBA European Championship for Small Countries. He served as vice-captain of the Irish team that won the 2021 FIBA European Championship for Small Countries. Between November 2021 to June 2022, he served as captain of the Irish team. He announced his retirement from national team duties on 27 June 2022 after a seven-year international career.
