= Shelvin Mack =

American basketball player (born 1990)

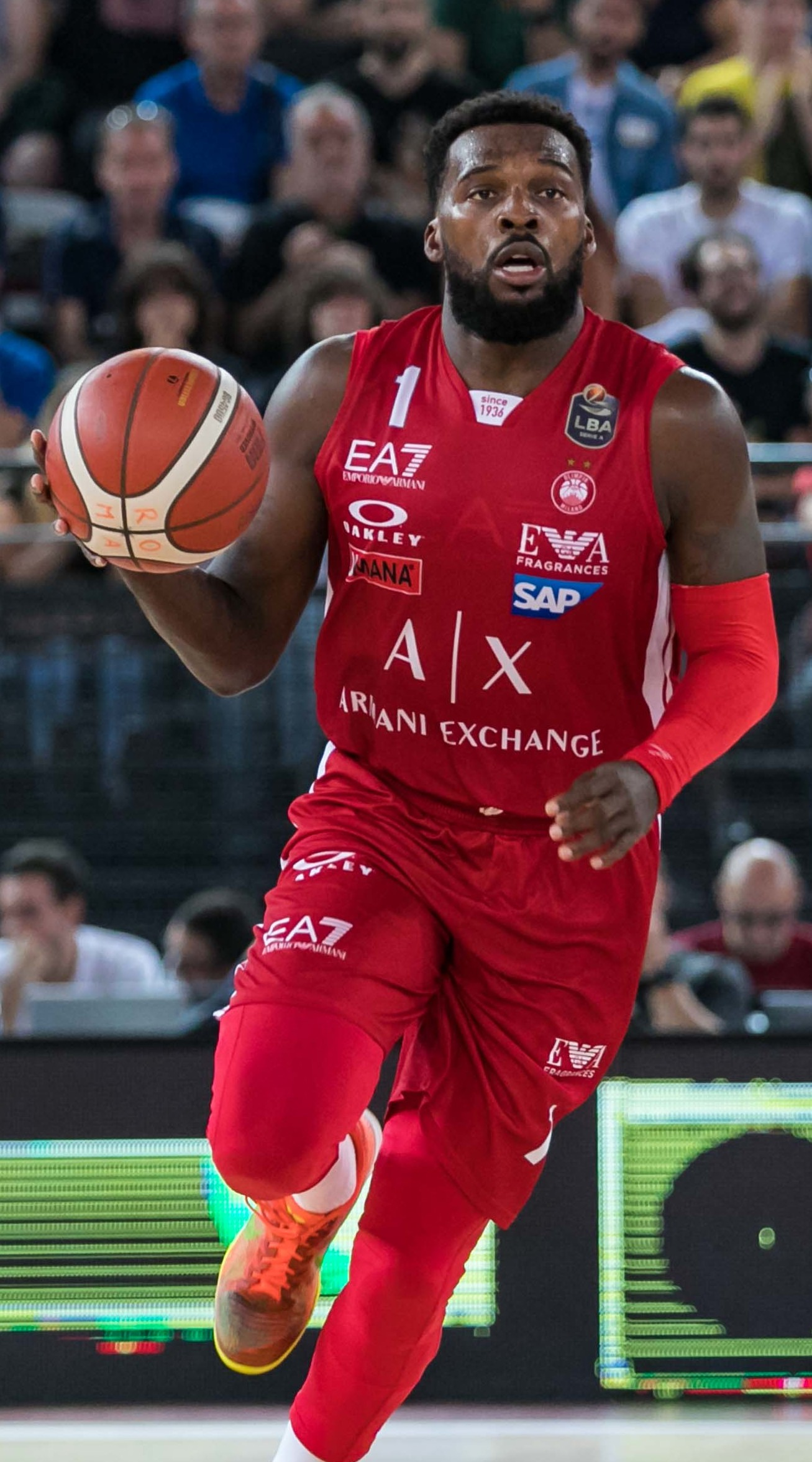
- Mack with Olimpia Milano in 2019

Personal information
- Born: April 22, 1990 (age 36) Lexington, Kentucky, U.S.
- Listed height: 6 ft 1 in (1.85 m)
- Listed weight: 203 lb (92 kg)

Career information
- High school: Bryan Station (Lexington, Kentucky)
- College: Butler (2008–2011)
- NBA draft: 2011: 2nd round, 34th overall pick
- Drafted by: Washington Wizards
- Playing career: 2011–2021
- Position: Point guard / shooting guard
- Number: 0, 1, 6, 7, 8, 14, 22

Career history
- 2011–2013: Washington Wizards
- 2012: →Maine Red Claws
- 2013: Philadelphia 76ers
- 2013: →Maine Red Claws
- 2013–2016: Atlanta Hawks
- 2016–2017: Utah Jazz
- 2017–2018: Orlando Magic
- 2018–2019: Memphis Grizzlies
- 2019: Charlotte Hornets
- 2019–2020: Olimpia Milano
- 2020: Hapoel Jerusalem
- 2020–2021: Panathinaikos

Career highlights
- Greek League champion (2021); Greek Cup winner (2021); Israeli State Cup winner (2020); NBA Development League All-Star (2013); First-team All-Horizon League (2010); Second-team All-Horizon League (2011); Horizon League All-Newcomer Team (2009)
- Stats at NBA.com
- Stats at Basketball Reference
Medals
Men's basketball
Representing the United States
U-19 World Championship
Gold medal – first place	2009 Auckland	Team

Shelvin Bernard Mack Jr. (born April 22, 1990) is an American former professional basketball player who is an analyst for CBS Sports. He played eight seasons in the National Basketball Association (NBA) for seven different teams. Mack played college basketball for the Butler Bulldogs, where he was a starter on consecutive Final Four teams in 2010 and 2011.

== High school career ==
Mack attended Bryan Station High School in Lexington, Kentucky. As a senior in 2007–08, he averaged 23.7 points, 7.7 rebounds, 7.5 assists, and 3.8 steals per game as he was named to the Lexington All-City team after leading the Defenders to a 30–3 record.

== College career ==
In his freshman season at Butler, Mack started in all 32 games, sharing the Butler freshman record for games started with teammates Ronald Nored and future Jazz teammate Gordon Hayward. He was named to the Horizon League All-Newcomer team and the Horizon League All-Tournament team after leading the Bulldogs in assists in 2008–09, becoming just the third freshman in Butler history to record 100 assists. In 32 games, he averaged 11.9 points, 4.4 rebounds, 3.5 assists and 1.1 steals in 30.8 minutes per game. During the off-season, Mack helped lead Team USA to the gold medal in the 2009 FIBA Under-19 World Championship with averages of 5.9 points per game.

In his sophomore season, he was named to the All-Horizon League first team and the NABC All-District 12 first team. He was also named to the Horizon League All-Tournament team and the West Regional All-Tournament team. In 38 games (all starts), he averaged 14.1 points, 3.7 rebounds, 3.0 assists and 1.4 steals in 30.9 minutes per game. He helped lead Butler to the 2010 National Championship game against Duke where Gordon Hayward missed a game-winning half-court shot which would have given Butler their very first NCAA championship.

In his junior season, he was named to the All-Horizon League second team and the NABC All-District 12 second team. He became just the 33rd Butler player to score 1,000 career points. In 38 games (37 starts), he averaged 16.0 points, 4.5 rebounds and 3.4 assists in 32.1 minutes per game.

On April 21, 2011, he declared for the NBA draft, foregoing his final year of college eligibility.

Year	Team	GP	GS	MPG	FG%	3P%	FT%	RPG	APG	SPG	BPG	PPG
2008–09	Butler	32	32	30.8	.391	.326	.757	4.4	3.5	1.1	.0	11.9
2009–10	Butler	38	38	30.9	.454	.391	.734	3.7	3.0	1.4	.1	14.1
2010–11	Butler	38	37	32.1	.408	.354	.769	4.5	3.4	.8	.1	16.0

== Professional career ==
=== Washington Wizards (2011–2012) ===
On June 23, 2011, Mack was selected with the 34th overall pick in the 2011 NBA draft by the Washington Wizards. On December 9, 2011, he signed with the Wizards following the conclusion of the NBA lockout. On February 1, 2012, he scored a then career-high 12 points in a 109–103 loss to the Orlando Magic.

In July 2012, Mack joined the Washington Wizards for the 2012 NBA Summer League. On October 28, 2012, he was waived by the Wizards.

=== Maine Red Claws (2012) ===
On November 2, Mack was selected with the fourth overall pick in the 2012 NBA Development League draft by the Maine Red Claws.

=== Return to Washington (2012–2013) ===
On December 25, 2012, Mack re-signed with the Wizards, but was again waived by the team on January 7, 2013.

=== Return to Maine (2013) ===
On January 9, 2013, Mack was reacquired by the Red Claws.

=== Philadelphia 76ers (2013) ===
On January 17, 2013, Mack signed a 10-day contract with the Philadelphia 76ers. On January 28, he signed a second 10-day contract with the 76ers. He was not retained by the 76ers following his second 10-day contract,

=== Third stint with Maine (2013) ===
On February 7, 2013, Mack was reacquired by the Red Claws. He went on to play for the Futures All-Star team in the 2013 NBA D-League All-Star Game.

=== Atlanta Hawks (2013–2016) ===
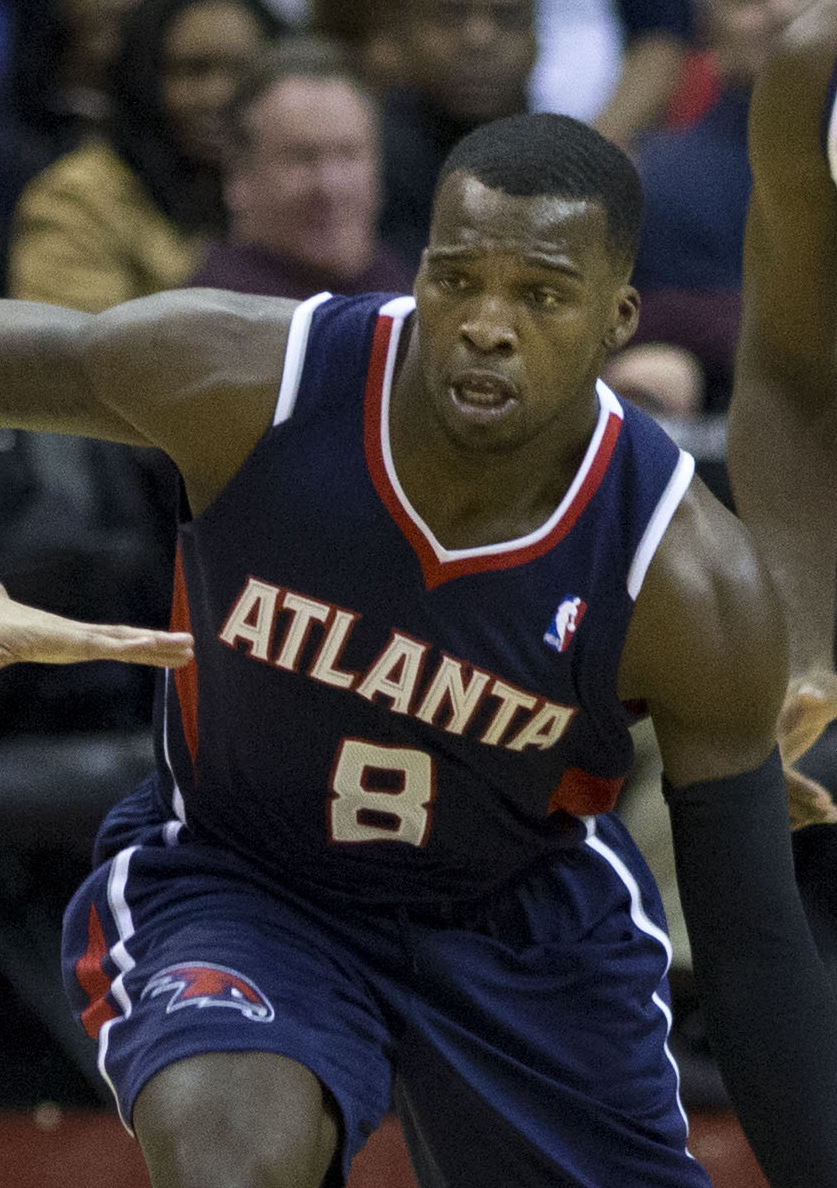
Mack with the Atlanta Hawks in November 2013

On March 6, 2013, Mack signed a 10-day contract with the Atlanta Hawks. On March 16, he signed a second 10-day contract. On March 26, he signed a two-year, non-guaranteed deal with the Hawks.

In July 2013, Mack joined the Hawks for the 2013 NBA Summer League. On February 21, 2014, he scored a then career-high 21 points in a 115–107 loss to the Detroit Pistons. In 2013–14, he played 73 games, averaging 7.5 points, 2.2 rebounds and 1.7 assists per game.

On August 22, 2014, Mack re-signed with the Hawks to a three-year, $7.3 million contract. On December 17, 2014, he scored a career-high 24 points on 6-of-6 from three-point range off the bench in a 127–98 win over the Cleveland Cavaliers.

=== Utah Jazz (2016–2017) ===
On February 18, 2016, Mack was traded to the Utah Jazz in a three-team trade involving the Hawks and the Chicago Bulls. The move reunited him with former Butler teammate Gordon Hayward and former Hawks assistant Quin Snyder. He made his debut for the Jazz on February 21, recording a season-high 16 points and six assists off the bench in a 115–111 loss to the Portland Trail Blazers. In the Jazz's next game two days later, Mack was elevated to the starting point guard role, replacing Raul Neto. He subsequently topped his season-high with 17 points in 32 minutes of action, as the Jazz defeated the Houston Rockets 117–114 in overtime. On March 11, he scored a career-high 27 points in a 114–93 win over the Washington Wizards.

On December 8, 2016, Mack scored a season-high 19 points in a 106–99 loss to the Golden State Warriors.

=== Orlando Magic (2017–2018) ===
On July 9, 2017, Mack signed with the Orlando Magic. In the 2017-18 NBA season, Mack led the Orlando Magic in assists, with 3.9 per game. On June 25, 2018, he was waived by the Magic.

=== Memphis Grizzlies (2018–2019) ===
On August 7, 2018, Mack signed with the Memphis Grizzlies.

On February 7, 2019, Mack was traded to the Atlanta Hawks in exchange for Tyler Dorsey. He was waived by the Hawks the following day.

=== Charlotte Hornets (2019) ===
On February 10, 2019, Mack was claimed off waivers by the Charlotte Hornets.

=== Olimpia Milano (2019–2020) ===
On July 25, 2019, Mack signed a two-year deal with Olimpia Milano of the Italian Lega Basket Serie A and the EuroLeague. He appeared in 19 games for Milano, averaging 5.8 points, 2.4 rebounds, and 2.4 assists in 18 minutes per game.

=== Hapoel Jerusalem (2020) ===
On January 16, 2020, Mack parted ways with Milano to join Hapoel Jerusalem of the Israeli Premier League for the rest of the season.

=== Panathinaikos (2020–2021) ===
On November 7, 2020, Mack signed a two-month deal with European powerhouse Panathinaikos of the Greek Basket League and the EuroLeague. His contract was subsequently renewed for the rest of the 2020–2021 season. On June 6, 2021, Mack parted ways with the Greek club amidst the domestic competition finals against Lavrio in order to attend to personal matters overseas. In 23 GBL and 21 EuroLeague games with the Greens, Mack averaged 6.5 points, 2 rebounds, and 4 assists.

== Broadcasting ==
In March 2022, Mack provided coverage for the 2022 NCAA Division I men's basketball tournament. He is currently an analyst for the CBS Sports show Inside College Basketball.

== Career statistics ==
Legend
GP	Games played	GS	Games started	MPG	Minutes per game
FG%	Field goal percentage	3P%	3-point field goal percentage	FT%	Free throw percentage
RPG	Rebounds per game	APG	Assists per game	SPG	Steals per game
BPG	Blocks per game	PPG	Points per game	**Bold**	Career high

=== Regular season ===
Year	Team	GP	GS	MPG	FG%	3P%	FT%	RPG	APG	SPG	BPG	PPG
2011–12	Washington	64	0	12.2	.400	.286	.712	1.4	2.0	.4	.0	3.6
2012–13	Washington	7	2	20.1	.400	.308	.500	2.3	3.3	**.9**	.0	5.3
2012–13	Philadelphia	4	0	1.8	**.500**	.000	.000	.0	.3	.0	.0	.5
2012–13	Atlanta	20	1	13.4	.488	**.400**	.571	1.2	2.2	.5	.0	5.2
2013–14	Atlanta	**73**	11	20.4	.417	.337	**.865**	2.2	3.7	.7	.0	7.5
2014–15	Atlanta	55	0	15.1	.401	.315	.806	1.4	2.8	.5	.0	5.4
2015–16	Atlanta	24	0	7.5	.421	.148	.750	.9	1.6	.3	.0	3.9
2015–16	Utah	28	**27**	**31.4**	.444	.357	.735	**3.8**	**5.3**	**.9**	**.1**	**12.7**
2016–17	Utah	55	9	21.9	.446	.308	.688	2.3	2.8	.8	**.1**	7.8
2017–18	Orlando	69	3	19.8	.430	.345	.711	2.4	3.9	.8	**.1**	6.9
2018–19	Memphis	53	3	22.7	.414	.359	.707	1.9	3.4	.8	**.1**	7.9
2018–19	Charlotte	4	0	10.5	.143	.000	.556	.5	.3	.5	.0	2.3
Career		456	56	18.4	.423	.330	.731	2.0	3.1	.7	.1	6.6

=== Playoffs ===
Year	Team	GP	GS	MPG	FG%	3P%	FT%	RPG	APG	SPG	BPG	PPG
2013	Atlanta	4	0	5.5	**.444**	.400	.000	1.8	1.8	.0	.0	2.5
2014	Atlanta	7	0	**16.9**	.404	.370	.750	1.9	**3.6**	.6	.0	**8.1**
2015	Atlanta	**10**	0	9.9	.385	.286	.500	1.1	1.0	**.8**	.0	3.9
2017	Utah	9	**3**	17.2	.347	**.467**	**.867**	**2.8**	2.0	.4	.0	6.0
Career		30	3	13.1	.382	.368	.758	1.9	2.0	.5	.0	5.3

=== EuroLeague ===
Year	Team	GP	GS	MPG	FG%	3P%	FT%	RPG	APG	SPG	BPG	PPG	PIR
2019–20	Milano	11	2	17.1	.367	.333	.750	1.8	1.8	.5	—	4.9	3.2
2020–21	Panathinaikos B.C.	26	4	16.3	.412	.417	.742	1.2	2.8	.7	—	6.0	5.0
Career		37	6	16.7	.389	.375	.746	1.5	2.3	.6	—	5.4	4.1

== Personal life ==
Mack is the son of Shelvin Mack Sr. and Victoria Guy, and has two sisters, Sierra and Keionna.
