= Ralph Noble =

American rugby union player (b. 1889)

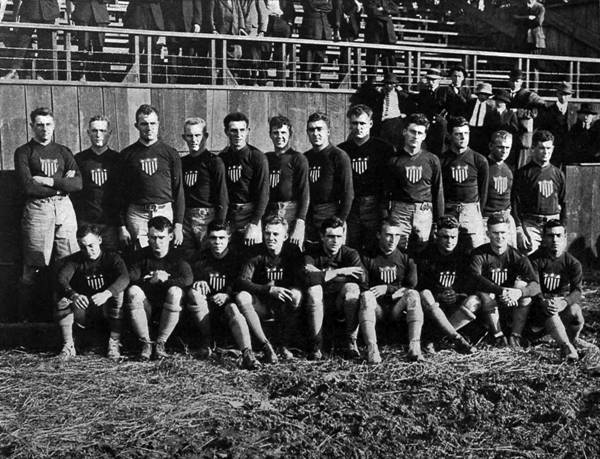
- Noble with the US team in 1912 (pictured front row, third from right)
- Full name: Ralph Matthews Noble
- Born: March 28, 1889 Harlan, Iowa
- Died: May 10, 1918 (aged 29) Europe
- School: Galesburg High School
- University: Knox College; Stanford University

Rugby union career
- Position: Wing
Amateur team(s)
Years	Team	Apps	(Points)
1911–1912	Stanford University		
- Correct as of November 8, 2018
International career
Years	Team	Apps	(Points)
1912	United States	1	(0)
- Correct as of November 8, 2018
Coaching career
- Years: Team
- 1913: San Diego High School

Ralph Matthews Noble (March 28, 1889 – May 10, 1918) was an American rugby union player who played at wing for the United States men's national team in its first capped match in 1912.

== Early life and university years ==
Ralph Noble was born on March 28, 1889, in Harlan, Iowa, the younger of two sons of Willard Noble and Elsie H. Noble (born Goddard). Noble attended Galesburg High School in Galesburg, Illinois, where he was a multi-sport athlete. Noble then attended Knox College before transferring to Stanford University in 1910. Noble was ineligible to play with the university's rugby team in 1910, but played at second-five during the 1911 season and at wing during the 1912 season. On November 16, 1912, Noble played for the United States team at wing in its first capped match—a 12–8 loss to Australia. Noble graduated from Stanford with a degree in mathematics in 1912 and served as the rugby coach at San Diego High School in 1913 before returning to Galesburg, Illinois where he worked as a farmer with his father.

== Military service and death ==
On May 15, 1917, Noble enlisted in the United States Army. On September 1, 1917, Noble was commissioned as a lieutenant at Fort Sheridan. While with the Army, Noble served with fellow United States rugby players Danny Carroll and Deke Gard in the West European theatre during World War I. In May 1918, while serving as an aerial observer, he was shot down behind enemy lines. Noble died on May 10, 1918 at a German Red Cross hospital as a result of injuries sustained in the crash. Noble was posthumously awarded the Croix de Guerre "for his skill, initiative and devotion in the performance of his duties." He was buried at the Somme American Cemetery in Bony, Aisne in northern France.
