= Ian O'Boyle =

Personal information
- Born: 6 March 1984 (age 42) Dublin, Ireland
- Listed height: 192 cm (6 ft 4 in)

Career information
- High school: Patrician Secondary School (Newbridge, County Kildare); Trinity-Pawling School (Pawling, New York)
- College: NJIT (2004–2005)
- Playing career: 2001–2016
- Position: Shooting guard

Career history
- 2001–2003: Notre Dame
- 2005–2006: UCD Marian
- 2006–2008: Shamrock Rovers Hoops
- 2008–2010: Ulster Elks
- 2010: Neptune
- 2013–2016: Norwood Flames
- 2016: Swords Thunder

Career highlights
- Premier League champion (2015); SuperLeague Junior Player of the Year (2003)

Ian O'Boyle (born 6 March 1984) is an Irish former basketball player. He played nine seasons in the Irish Super League as well as four seasons in the South Australian Premier League, where he won a championship. He has represented the Irish national team.

== Early life ==
O'Boyle was born in Dublin, Ireland. He attended Patrician Secondary School in Newbridge, County Kildare.

== Basketball career ==
=== Ireland and United States ===
O'Boyle debuted in the Irish SuperLeague for Notre Dame during the 2001–02 season. With Notre Dame in 2002–03, he was named the Junior Men's Player of the Year.

In 2003, O'Boyle moved to the United States and enrolled at New York's Trinity-Pawling School. He played for the Trinity-Pawling School basketball team in 2003–04, earning first-team all-TriState and first-team all-New England. After graduating from Trinity-Pawling, O'Boyle accepted a scholarship to play at New Jersey Institute of Technology (NJIT). In NJIT's home opener of the 2004–05 season, O'Boyle led the team in scoring with 16 points to secure a win over Philadelphia University, who were coached by Basketball Hall of Fame coach Herb Magee, who labelled O'Boyle as a phenomenal shooter after the victory.

In 2005, O'Boyle moved back to Ireland to complete his university studies. Along with attending University College Dublin (UCD), O'Boyle played for UCD Marian in the SuperLeague during the 2005–06 season. He returned to Notre Dame, now Shamrock Rovers Hoops, in 2006 and played two seasons there before joining Ulster Elks in 2008. After two seasons with Ulster, he joined Neptune for the 2010–11 season. He left Neptune in December 2010.

=== New Zealand and Australia ===
In March 2011, O'Boyle played for the Manawatu Jets of the New Zealand NBL during their pre-season games. He had another pre-season stint with the Jets in 2012.

O'Boyle moved to South Australia in 2013 to work at the University of South Australia. He subsequently joined the Norwood Flames of the Premier League. He played four seasons for the Flames, including winning a championship with them in 2015.

=== Return to Ireland ===
After returning to Ireland, O'Boyle joined Swords Thunder for the 2016–17 Irish Super League season. He appeared in two games at the start of the season.

== National team career ==
O'Boyle played for the Irish national team at the FIBA EuroBasket 2007 Division B and FIBA EuroBasket 2009 Division B. In a game against Luxembourg in 2009, he hit six consecutive first half three-pointers and ended the game with 23 points in a winning effort.

== Personal ==
O'Boyle's father, Conor O'Boyle, is a former Chief of Staff of the Irish Defence Forces.

Off the court, O'Boyle is a professor in sport management.
