= Robert Blackwell (disambiguation) =

Robert Blackwell (1918–1985) was an American bandleader.

Robert Blackwell may also refer to:

- Robert Blackwell (1748–1831), American minister, surgeon, Served at Valley Forge
- Robert L. Blackwell (1895–1918), American soldier posthumously given the Medal of Honor
- Robert Blackwell Jr., American businessman

== See also ==
- Robert Blackwill (born 1939), American diplomat and lobbyist
