= 41st Battalion, Royal New South Wales Regiment =

Australian Army unit

- Active: 1965–present
- Country: Australia
- Branch: Australian Army
- Type: Light infantry
- Role: Ground combat
- Size: Headquarters, signals platoon, and two rifle companies
- Part of: 5th Brigade, 2nd Division
- Motto: Mors Ante Pudorem (Death before Dishonour)
- Colours: Black over light blue on horizontal oval
- March: Cock O'The North

Commanders
- Commanding Officer: Lieutenant Colonel Danial Healy
- Regimental Sergeant Major: WO1 Matt McMahon

Insignia
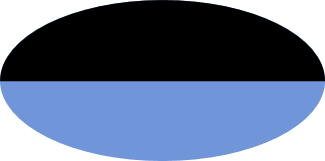
- Unit colour patch

The 41st Battalion, Royal New South Wales Regiment, (41 RNSWR), is an infantry battalion of the Australian Army. An Army Reserve unit, it is one of four battalions of the Royal New South Wales Regiment and is attached to the 5th Brigade, 2nd Division. It is based in northern New South Wales, with its headquarters in Lismore and depots in a number of locations including Taree, Tweed Heads, FGC (Grafton), Kempsey, Port Macquarie and Coffs Harbour. In its present form the battalion was raised in 1965, however, it can trace its lineage back to a couple of Scottish Rifles units formed in the 1899 in Lismore and Maclean. It also perpetuates the battle honours and traditions of the 41st Bn AIF, that served on the Western Front during World War I.

== History ==
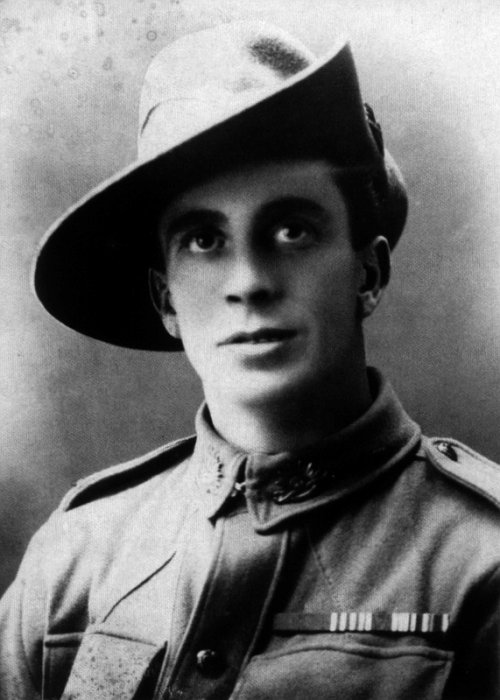
Bernard Gordon, the 41st Battalion's sole Victoria Cross recipient

=== Earliest militia units ===
Drawing its lineage from the Byron Scottish Regiment, which had previously existed prior to the Pentropic restructure, 41 RNSWR's predecessor units can trace their history back to the Maclean Company & Lismore Company of Scottish Rifles which was formed in 1899. This unit went through a number of name changes during its early history upon Australia's Federation, soon becoming part of the 9th Infantry (Moreton) Regiment headquartered in Queensland. This changed in 1912, when the unit was reorganised to be wholly within the Northern Rivers region of New South Wales, designated as the 12th (Byron) Infantry Regiment. The Byron territorial title was because of a strong desire to align the region with the Byron name, such as Federal electorate but outside of this battalion, the naming did not stick.. An unrelated unit, designated the 41st Infantry Regiment, was based in Penrith, Lithgow and Bathurst at this time.

=== World War I ===
==== 1916 ====
During World War I, the battalion was raised as part of the Australian Imperial Force (AIF). Originally the battalion was to be known as the 35th Battalion but was renumbered when the 4th and 5th Divisions were raised in Egypt prior to the 3rd Division completing its formation in Australia. Now known as the 41st Battalion, it had been formed in February 1916 at Bell's Paddock (present day site of Brookside Shopping Centre and Mt Maria College) near the current Gallipoli Barracks, Enoggera, in Brisbane, Queensland, with men drawn from Queensland and northern New South Wales. It was assigned to the 11th Brigade, 3rd Division. Together with the initial raising of the battalion, nine groups of reinforcements were recruited and sent from Brisbane during the course of the war. After initial training, the battalion boarded a train to Sydney in May, 1916 to embark on the HMAT Demosthenes (AT64), to England. They travelled via Cape Town and the Cape Verde Islands, before arriving at Plymouth in July 1916.

The battalion moved with the 3rd Division to Larkhill, site of the current Royal School of Artillery, in the Salisbury Plain Training Area. In November 1916, the battalion sailed for the Western Front from Portsmouth, England, to Le Havre, France, and moved towards the border area with Belgium near Armentières. The battalion entered the frontline for the first time on Christmas Eve, 1916 at the Mushroom Salient, just east of La Chapelle-d'Armentières, of which four soldiers were killed by artillery fire on the first night.

==== 1917 ====
The battalion rotated through the frontline around Armentieres in France and across the Lys River in Belgium for most of the first half of 1917. The first major offensive of the war occurred in June at the Battle of Messines, where the battalion held the entire 11th Brigade frontage before the mines were set off and the assault began. The battalion was then involved in a series of smaller "Bite and Hold" attacks to exploit the gains from the Battle of Messines. Most notable of these was the assault against the 'Windmill' position of the Germans near Warneton, Belgium. The previous British battalion has stopped short of their intended objective, due to navigational errors on the churned up battlefield. The 41st Battalion thus had to assault across a longer than expected area, then hold on to their gains. The wet and saturated soils meant that trenches were nearly impossible to dig, so the position was merely a series of linked up flooded shell craters, from which the battalion repulsed several counterattacks over the next 18 days. Military Medals were awarded to two soldiers during this action for the heroic and near impossible act of being able to bring rations up to the frontline.

After this action, the battalion was withdrawn from the frontline to the northern France and was brought back up to strength and underwent further training. The next major battle was the participation in the Battle of Broodseinde, and Passchendaele in September and October. This saw the battalion leap-frogging the 42nd Bn AIF, to continue the assault, north of the Ypres–Roulers railway. It linked up with the 40th Bn AIF near the present day Tyne Cot Cemetery. The battalion then was used to press home further attacks, until relieved by Canadian forces who went on to capture Passchendaele.

==== 1918 ====
In early 1918, the battalion was resting and refitting in northern France, preparing to return to the Belgian battlefields near Ypres, when the German spring offensive occurred and caught the Entente forces off guard. The battalion was hastily ordered south from their rest camp at Quesques to stop the German advance. In the move south, they encountered thousands of fleeing refugees and disorganised retreating British units. At Doullens, the battalion took up defensive positions whilst the Doullens Conference took place, putting all allied Entente forces under French command. After which, the battalion was sent forward to defend beside the Bray–Corbie Road, near Amiens, remaining in the frontline against constant German attack for 39 days before being relieved. It also took part in fighting around Morlancourt at this time. The battalion then took its turn in manning the frontline, including at Villers-Bretonneux, where 'A' Company was essentially wiped out in a German gas attack. Thus to reinforce the battalion before the Battle of Hamel, it was linked up with the American 131st Regiment of the Illinois National Guard, forming a new 'X' Company. However, General John Pershing forbade any American soldiers to fight under foreign command and they were withdrawn shortly before the battle commenced. The battalion then took part in the Allied Hundred Days Offensive which ultimately brought about an end to the war. The 41st Battalion's final involvement in the fighting came in early October when they took part in the joint Australian–US operation along the St Quentin Canal.

After finishing the Hundred Days Offensive near Bony, France, near the present Somme American Cemetery and Memorial, the battalion had been reduced to a strength of less than 250 men, from a normal strength of over 1,000. Due to falling recruitment numbers and the failure of the two conscription referendums in Australia, it was decided to merge the 42nd Bn AIF into the 41st. However, this was met with strong resentment and resistance, in a near mutinous atmosphere. It took three attempts for the units to parade as one, with the 42nd Bn becoming 'B' Company of the 41st Bn, allowed to wear the 42nd Bn unit colour patch underneath their 41st Bn patch. It was out of the line resting when the Armistice was signed in November 1918, yet it took three days for official news of the Armistice to reach them in Saint-Maxent, France. The unit was slowly sent home in a series of groups and was formally disbanded in May 1919. Losses during the war totalled 444 killed and 1,577 wounded. One member of the battalion, Bernard Gordon, received the Victoria Cross. Other decorations included: one Companion of the Order of St Michael and St George, two Distinguished Service Orders, 13 Military Crosses and three Bars, 12 Distinguished Conduct Medals, 82 Military Medals and two Bars, four Meritorious Service Medals, 26 Mentions in Despatches and seven foreign awards.

=== Between the World Wars ===
In 1918, the original militia unit, which did not deploy overseas during World War I, was amalgamated with the 12th (Byron) Infantry AMF to form the 2nd Battalion, 41st Infantry after the Citizens Force was reorganised to form multi-battalion regiments which were numbered after units of the AIF with which they had been associated. The Australian Governor-General Sir Ronald Munro Ferguson presented the King's Colours to the 41st Bn AIF on 23 August 1920 at The Domain, Brisbane. In 1921, the decision was made to disband all of the AIF and to perpetuate their battle honours and traditions by reforming the Citizens Force along the same lines as the AIF, with the multi-battalion regiments being redesignated as separate battalions and adopting the unit colour patches and battle honours of the AIF. Consequently, the 2nd Battalion, 41st Infantry was redesignated as the 41st Battalion.

In 1927, territorial designations were adopted and the battalion adopted the title 41st Battalion (The Byron Regiment). The motto Mors Ante Pudorem was also approved at this time. Unit Colours were presented to the 41st Bn (The Byron Scottish) in Grafton, NSW on 27 March 1927 during the annual training camp. With the Byron Scottish territorial titles combining the Scottish Rifles heritage with the Byron regimental title. In 1929, the compulsory training scheme was suspended by the Scullin Labor government, and this, combined with the economic hardships of the Great Depression led to a decline in the number of recruits. As a result, the battalion was amalgamated with the 2nd Battalion to form the 2nd/41st Battalion. In 1933, these two units were delinked, however, the 41st Battalion was amalgamated with the 33rd Battalion to form the 33rd/41st Battalion. They remained linked until 1936 when tensions in Europe meant that the government decided to double the size of the Militia.

=== World War II ===
During World War II, the battalion served in a garrison role within Australia and did not see active service overseas, even though it was gazetted as an AIF battalion after the majority of its members volunteered to do so. Initially it served at Bobs Farm, NSW, as it guarded the coastline between Newcastle and Port Stephens. It later moved to Frenchs Forest in the Northern suburbs of Sydney, where a jungle training centre was established to train soldiers destined to serve in the South West Pacific campaigns. In 1943, when the Australian Army began reallocating manpower resources, the battalion was amalgamated once more with the 2nd Battalion, forming the 41st/2nd Battalion. In August 1944, in response to the Cowra Breakout, the battalion was transported to that region to search for escaped Japanese prisoners of war and to transport and escort the remaining prisoners to other camps after the incident. After this, the unit was moved to Lone Pine Barracks in Singleton, where they remained until the end of the war. They remained linked until December 1945 when the demobilisation process began and the unit was disbanded.

=== Citizens Military Force ===
In 1948, the Citizens Military Force was re-raised, albeit on a limited scale. It was in line with the compulsory service introduced after World War II. The 41st Battalion was re-formed at this time, adopting the title 41st Infantry Battalion (The Byron Regiment), however, the following year its title was changed to The Byron Scottish Regiment. This remained the state of affairs until 1960, when the Pentropic divisional structure was introduced and the battalion became 'E' (Byron Scottish) Company, 1st Battalion, Royal Queensland Regiment. The unit remained part of that regiment until being reformed as a full battalion within the Royal New South Wales Regiment after 1965.

=== Founding of the current battalion ===
41 RNSWR was formed in 1965 after the Australian Army ended its experiment with the Pentropic divisional structure which, in 1960, had seen the reorganisation of the previously existing regional Citizens Military Force (CMF) infantry battalions into company-sized elements within six new State-based regiments. The experiment was a failure and by 1965, the Army returned to the triangular divisional structure and the CMF was reorganised once more. In an effort to reinvigorate the regional ties that had been so important to the CMF, the Pentropic battalions were reduced and new battalions formed by re-raising a number of their subordinate companies to battalion strength and re-adopting historical numerical designations. As a part of this reorganisation, the Byron Scottish Company, which had been part of the 1st Battalion, Royal Queensland Regiment was expanded to form the 41st Battalion, Royal New South Wales Regiment, headquartered around Lismore on the northern New South Wales coast.

== Recent roles ==
Recently 41 RNSWR has had a number of operational roles.

=== Military operations and deployments ===
- These roles have included providing soldiers to serve with INTERFET in East Timor and with the Peace Monitoring Groups in Bougainville.
- In 2000, as part of Operation Gold, they took part in providing security to the Sydney Olympic Games through the Operational Search Battalion.
- Personnel from the battalion have also deployed as part of commitments to the Solomon Islands as part of the Regional Assistance Mission to Solomon Islands (RAMSI) and Malaysia with Rifle Company Butterworth.
- In 2008, as part of Operation Testament, the Battalion assisted in providing assistance and security for the Papal Visit of Pope Benedict XVI and the hosting of World Youth Day in Sydney.
- In 2011, members of the battalion served in East Timor as part of the Timor Leste Task Group (TLTG).

=== Domestic Disaster Operations ===
- Within the North Coast of New South Wales, the 41st Battalion, RNSWR has responded to several natural disasters that have afflicted the region. This includes supporting firefighters during the 2019–20 Australian bushfire season that saw much of the East Coast of NSW in flames. They assisted with logistical support, feeding hundreds of firefighters across the fire zone and assisting in the clean up efforts on the South Coast of NSW.
- This was followed by the 2021 Eastern Australia Floods across the Mid North Coast of NSW, based out of Coffs Harbour, Port Macquarie and Kempsey, NSW.
- In 2022, the biggest floods in recorded history hit the Northern Rivers of NSW during the 2022 Eastern Australia Floods. Impacting immediately around the Battalion Headquarters in Lismore, the soldiers immediately responded and assisted other agencies in the response. This is despite many of the soldiers losing their own homes and civilian workplaces during the disaster. For which, those who responded were awarded the Australian Defence Force Gold Group Citation for their efforts.
- In October 2022, soldiers deployed to assist with flooding in Moree, NSW.

== Kilted tradition ==
Due to its lineage from the Byron Scottish Regiment, 41 RNSWR retains an entitlement to wear the kilt. The battalion was formerly known as the 41st Battalion, The Byron Scottish Regiment. This is due to the large number of Scots who settled in the north of the state in areas such as Grafton, Byron Bay and Maclean. 41 RNSWR maintains an alliance with the Argyll and Sutherland Highlanders, upon which the Byron Scottish insignia is based. personnel from the battalion's Grafton depot may wear the kilt of the Black Watch Regiment on ceremonial occasions.

== Unit motto ==
"Mors Ante Pudorem", which means "Death before Dishonour", was adopted by unit as a reflection of the fact that, since its 1917 inception, no member has ever surrendered to enemy forces.

== Locations ==
41 RNSWR is located all along the northern New South Wales coast, including depots in:

- Tweed Heads: (1 Platoon, 3 Platoon and Headquarters 'A' Company)
- Lismore: (Battalion Headquarters, Admin Company, 2 Platoon 'A' Company)
- Grafton: (8 Platoon 'C' Company)
- Coffs Harbour: (Headquarters 'C' Company, 7 Platoon)
- Port Macquarie (9 Platoon 'C' Company)
- Taree (10 Platoon ‘Underground Delta’ Company)

== Victoria Cross recipients ==
- Lance Corporal Bernard Sidney Gordon VC, MM, of the 41st Battalion, 11th Brigade, 3rd Division. Originally from Tasmania, he enlisted with the 41st Bn AIF in 1916 in Queensland. He was awarded the Military Medal for his bravery in action in August 1918, then three weeks later near Bray-sur-Somme, his deeds saw him awarded the Victoria Cross. He was wounded and taken out of action for the rest of the war, only three days later, at the Battle of Mont Saint-Quentin.

For most conspicuous bravery and devotion to duty on 26–27 August 1918, east of Bray. He led his section through heavy shell-fire to the objective which he consolidated. Single-handed he attacked an enemy machine-gun which was enfilading, the company on his right, killed the men on the gun and captured the post, which contained one officer and ten men. He then cleaned up a trench, capturing twenty-nine prisoners and two machine-guns. In cleaning up further trenches he captured twenty-two prisoners, including one officer, and three machine-guns. Practically unaided, he captured, in the course of these operations, two officers and sixty-one other ranks, together with six machine-guns, and displayed throughout a wonderful example of fearless initiative.

- Warrant Officer Second Class Ray Simpson VC, DCM, of the Australian Army Training Team Vietnam. Enlisting from Taree, NSW, he began his military career during World War II with the 41st/2nd Battalion AIF before going on to serve in the Pacific campaigns, then in Korean War, Malaya and three tours of the Vietnam War. He received the Distinguished Conduct Medal on his second tour. On the 6th and 11 May 1969, his actions and valour saw that he was awarded the Victoria Cross.

Disregarding his own safety, he moved forward in the face of accurate enemy machine-gun fire, in order to cover the initial evacuation of the casualties. The wounded were eventually moved out of the line of enemy fire, which all this time was directed at Warrant Officer Simpson from close range. At the risk of almost certain death he made several attempts to move further forward towards his Battalion Commander's body but on each occasion he was stopped by heavy fire. Realising the position was becoming untenable and that priority should be given to extricating other casualties as quickly as possible, Warrant Officer Simpson alone and still under enemy fire covered the withdrawal of the wounded by personally placing himself between the wounded and the enemy.

From this position he fought on and by outstanding courage and valour was able to prevent the enemy advance until the wounded were removed from the immediate vicinity. Warrant Officer Simpson's gallant and individual action and his coolness under fire were exceptional and were instrumental in achieving the successful evacuation of the wounded to the helicopter evacuation pad.

Warrant Officer Simpson's repeated acts of personal bravery in this operation were an inspiration to all Vietnamese, United States and Australian soldiers who served with him. His conspicuous gallantry was in the highest tradition of the Australian Army.

== Australia's first turbaned Sikh soldier ==
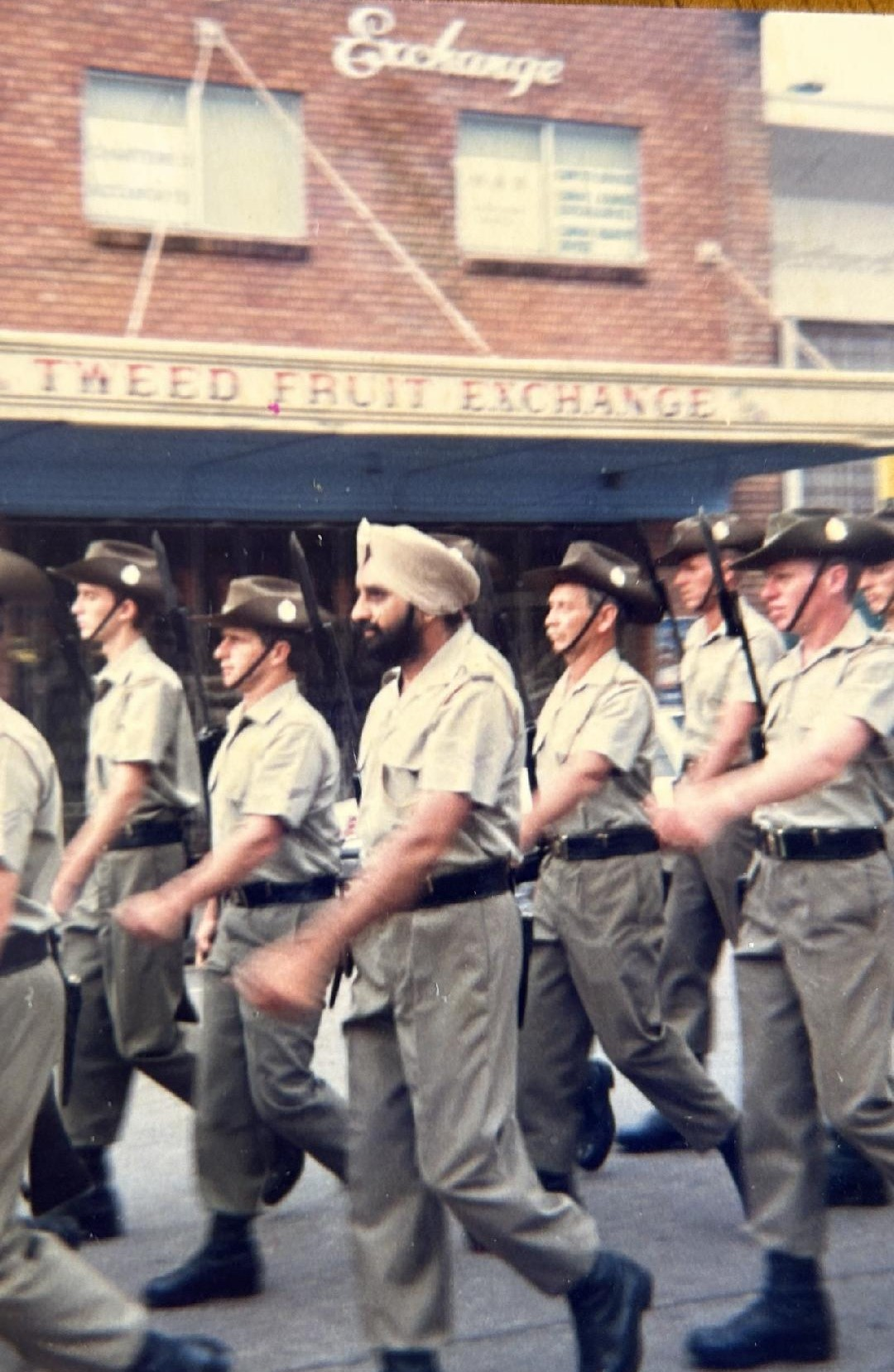
Corporal Harbans Singh Mann, Assault Pioneer. 41st Battalion, Murwillumbah, Royal New South Wales Regiment

Corporal Harbans Singh Mann joined the 41st Battalion on the 13th of November 1981, and enlisted as an Assault Pioneer in Murwillumbah. Corporal Singh was instrumental in changing Australia's defence force policies and improving social integration. Corporal Singh wrote several letters to the commander of the 2nd Training Group requesting that he address the inequality within the Australian Defence Force (ADF) by allowing him to maintain his beard and wear a turban while in service. He was the first person in the Australian Defence Force (in all three services) that spanned more than 90 years at the time, to have his faith formally recognized while in uniform.

Corporal Singh went on to design how the turban would be worn and how the unit crest should be displayed, a tradition that now carries forward to this day. Major Alex Rubin stated that "Corporal Singh was known as a soldier who could fix anything, whether it was with tools or with words. Singh was not only a leader in his own right in the Australian Defense Force, he was a proud Sikh and he was a man who made change, positive change in a legacy that remains today in the Australian Defence Force".
