= Ulster Shield =

The logo of the Ulster Women's Branch of the Irish Hockey Association.

The Ulster Shield is the premier knock-out competition for ladies' hockey teams in the Ulster province of Ireland. It is one of the oldest ladies' hockey competitions in the world, with the first competition being held in 1896. Ireland was the first country to form a national association when the Irish Ladies Hockey Union was formed in 1894.

From 1903 until the mid-1980s the winners qualified to represent Ulster in the Irish Senior Cup.

The most successful club is Pegasus with 28 wins from 34 final appearances.

== Performance by club ==
Performance Table
Club	Winners	Runners-up	Total finals	Last title
Pegasus	30	7	37	2022-23
Knock	13	9	22	1947-48
Ards	11	5	16	2014-15
Victorians	10	10	20	1969-70
Instonians	10	3	13	1964-65
Randalstown	9	5	14	2015-16
Holywood	8	0	8	1908-09
Portadown	6	12	18	1991-92
Queen's University	5	14	19	2017-18
St Dominic's Past Pupils	3	1	4	1956-57
Ballymoney	2	4	6	2012-13
Ulster College of Physical Education/Ulster Elks	2	4	6	2009-10
Cliftonville	2	3	5	1910-11
Victoria College, Belfast	2	0	2	1898-99
Owls	1	3	4	1948-49
Lurgan	1	2	3	2016-17
Victoria High School, Derry	1	2	3	1901-02
Bangor	1	1	2	1903-04
City of Derry	1	0	1	1896-97
Collegians/Belfast Harlequins	0	7	7	N/A
Mid Antrim	0	4	4	N/A
Roebank (Limavady)	0	3	3	N/A
Strand House School, Derry	0	3	3	N/A
Armagh	0	2	2	N/A
Belvoir	0	2	2	N/A
Nomads	0	2	2	N/A
The Route, Coleraine	0	2	2	N/A
Downshire	0	1	1	N/A
Dungannon	0	1	1	N/A
Lisfannon (Buncrana)	0	1	1	N/A
North Down	0	1	1	N/A
Stranmillis Training College	0	1	1	N/A

== FINALS ==
(Records are incomplete)

=== 1890s ===
Year	Winner			Runner-up	Notes
1896-97	City of Derry			(Holywood or Strand House School, Derry)	
1897-98	Victoria College, Belfast	4	3	The Route, Coleraine	
1898-99	Victoria College, Belfast	3	1	Strand House School, Derry	

=== 1900s ===
Year	Winner			Runner-up	Notes
1899-1900	Holywood	3	0	Victoria High School, Derry	
1900-01	Holywood	4	0	The Route, Coleraine	
1901-02	Victoria High School, Derry	2	1	Belvoir	Replay - Game 1: 1-1
1902-03	Holywood	1	0	Belvoir	
1903-04	Bangor	4	0	Victoria High School, Derry	
1904-05	Holywood	2	1	Downshire	
1905-06	Holywood	5	0	Bangor	
1906-07	Holywood	3	0	Strand House School, Derry	
1907-08	Holywood	2	1	Lisfannon (Buncrana)	
1908-09	Holywood	2	1	Cliftonville	

=== 1910s ===
Year	Winner			Runner-up	Notes
1909-10	Cliftonville	4	0	Strand House School, Derry	
1910-11	Cliftonville	2	0	Roebank (Limavady)	Replay - Game 1: 0-0
1911-12	Knock	3	1	Roebank (Limavady)	
1912-13	Knock	1	0	Roebank (Limavady)	
1913-14	Knock				
1914-15	Knock	3	0	Cliftonville	
1915-16	Not played due to World War I				
1916-17	Not played due to World War I				
1917-18	Not played due to World War I				
1918-19	Knock				

=== 1920s ===
Year	Winner			Runner-up	Notes
1919-20	Knock	2	0	Queen's University	
1920-21	Knock	3	0	Cliftonville	
1921-22	Knock	7	1	Dungannon	
1922-23	Knock	2	1	Queen's University	after extra time
1923-24	Knock	7	1	Victorians	
1924-25	Knock	5	1	Queen's University	
1925-26	Queen's University	2	1	Nomads	
1926-27	Queen's University	2	1	Knock	Replay - Game 1: 2-2
1927-28	Knock	3	1	Nomads	
1928-29	Queen's University	w	o	Knock	after 1–1 draw - Knock unable to field team for replay

=== 1930s ===
Year	Winner			Runner-up	Notes
1929-30	Ards	2	0	Queen's University	
1930-31	Instonians	3	1	Queen's University	
1931-32	Ards	2	1	Queen's University	
1932-33	Queen's University	2	1	Ards	
1933-34	Ards	5	4	Queen's University	after extra time
1934-35	Instonians	2	1	Ards	
1935-36	Ards	7	1	Knock	
1936-37	Ards	5	1	Queen's University	
1937-38	Instonians	3	1	Ards	
1938-39	Ards	2	0	Instonians	

=== 1940s ===
Year	Winner			Runner-up	Notes
1939-40	Not Played due to World War II				
1940-41					
1941-42					
1942-43	Victorians	4	2	Ards	
1943-44	Ards	2	1	Victorians	
1944-45	Victorians			Collegians	
1945-46	Victorians	4	2	Knock	
1946-47	Victorians	5	3	Owls	after extra time
1947-48	Knock	2	1	Owls	Replay - Game 1: 1-1
1948-49	Owls	4	2	Victorians	

=== 1950s ===
Year	Winner			Runner-up	Notes
1949-50	Victorians	3	2	Queen's University	Replay - Game 1: 1-1
1950-51	Victorians			Owls	Replay - Game 1: 1-1
1951-52	St Dominic's Past Pupils			Victorians	
1952-53	Instonians	6	1	Victorians	
1953-54	St Dominic's Past Pupils	5	4	Victorians	
1954-55	Instonians	1	0	Queens University	
1955-56	Instonians	3	2	Victorians	
1956-57	St Dominic's Past Pupils	4	1	Knock	
1957-58	Instonians	3	2	St Dominic's Past Pupils	
1958-59	Ards	3	2	Instonians	

=== 1960s ===
Year	Winner			Runner-up	Notes
1959-60	Instonians	3	1	Knock	after extra time
1960-61	Instonians	3	2	Victorians	
1961-62	Victorians	5	3	Instonians	
1962-63	Victorians	3	1	Queen's University	
1963-64	Ards	7	0	Stranmillis Training College	
1964-65	Instonians	4	1	Ards	
1965-66	Victorians	2	1	Queen's University	Replay - Game 1: 2-2
1966-67	Pegasus	2	1	Victorians	
1967-68	Pegasus	1	0	Mid Antrim	Replay - Game 1: 0-0
1968-69	Pegasus	3	1	Mid Antrim	

=== 1970s ===
Year	Winner			Runner-up	Notes
1969-70	Victorians	5	1	Ulster College of Physical Education	
1970-71	Ulster College of Physical Education	2	1	Mid Antrim	Replay - Game 1: 2-2
1971-72	Portadown	2	1	Pegasus	
1972-73	Pegasus	3	1	Portadown	
1973-74	Pegasus	4	0	Mid Antrim	
1974-75	Pegasus	4	2	Ulster College of Physical Education	
1975-76	Pegasus	1	0	Portadown	
1976-77	Portadown	1	0	Pegasus	
1977-78	Pegasus	2	1	Portadown	
1978-79	Pegasus	1	0	Portadown	

=== 1980s ===
Year	Winner			Runner-up	Notes
1979-80	Portadown	4	0	Knock	
1980-81	Pegasus	2	1	Portadown	
1981-82	Pegasus	1	0	Knock	
1982-83	Portadown	2	0	Randalstown	
1983-84	Pegasus	2	0	Portadown	
1984-85	Portadown	2	1	Pegasus	after extra time in Replay - Game 1: 0-0
1985-86	Randalstown	1	0	Portadown	after extra time
1986-87	Pegasus	5	2	Portadown	
1987-88	Pegasus	3	0	Portadown	
1988-89	Pegasus	1	0	Randalstown	

=== 1990s ===
Year	Winner			Runner-up	Notes
1989-90	Randalstown	2	1	Portadown	
1990-91	Randalstown	3	0	Portadown	
1991-92	Portadown	1	0	Randalstown	
1992-93	Randalstown	4	1	Collegians	
1993-94	Randalstown	2	0	Pegasus	
1994-95	Randalstown	6	0	Collegians	
1995-96	Pegasus	3	0	Knock	
1996-97	Pegasus	2	0	North Down	
1997-98	Pegasus	4	0	Randalstown	Replay - Game 1: 1-1
1998-99	Pegasus	5	0	Collegians	

=== 2000s ===
Year	Winner			Runner-up	Notes
1999-2000	Pegasus	4	1	Victorians	
2000-01	Pegasus	5	0	Portadown	
2001-02	Pegasus	4	0	Ballymoney	
2002-03	Pegasus	3	0	Randalstown	
2003-04	Randalstown			Belfast Harlequins	
2004-05	Pegasus			Ballymoney	
2005-06	Pegasus	2	0	Ballymoney	
2006-07	Randalstown	1	0	Armagh	
2007-08	Pegasus	3	0	Ballymoney	
2008-09	Pegasus	2	0	Ulster Elks	

=== 2010s ===
Year	Winner			Runner-up	Notes
2009-10	Ulster Elks	2	1	Lurgan	golden goal in extra time
2010-11	Ballymoney	2	0	Ulster Elks	Played at Lisnagarvey
2011-12	Pegasus	1	0	Armagh	
2012-13	Ballymoney	1	0	Pegasus	
2013-14	Ards	3	1	Pegasus	
2014-15	Ards	3	3	Pegasus	Ards won 2–1 on penalties
2015-16	Randalstown	2	2	Queen's University	Randalstown won 4–2 in penalty shoot-out
2016-17	Lurgan	3	1	Queen's University	
2017-18	Queen's University	2	1	Lurgan	
2018-19	Pegasus	2	2	Belfast Harlequins	

=== 2020s ===
Year	Winner			Runner-up	Notes
2019-20	Pegasus	3	1	Belfast Harlequins	
2020-21	Not played due to Covid-19				
2021-22	Pegasus	3	2	Banbridge	Played at Stormont
2022-23	Pegasus	4	2	Belfast Harlequins	
2023-24	Pegasus	2	1	Ulster Elks	
2024-25	Ulster Elks	2	1	Queen's University	
