= William T. Fitzsimons =

United States Army lieutenant

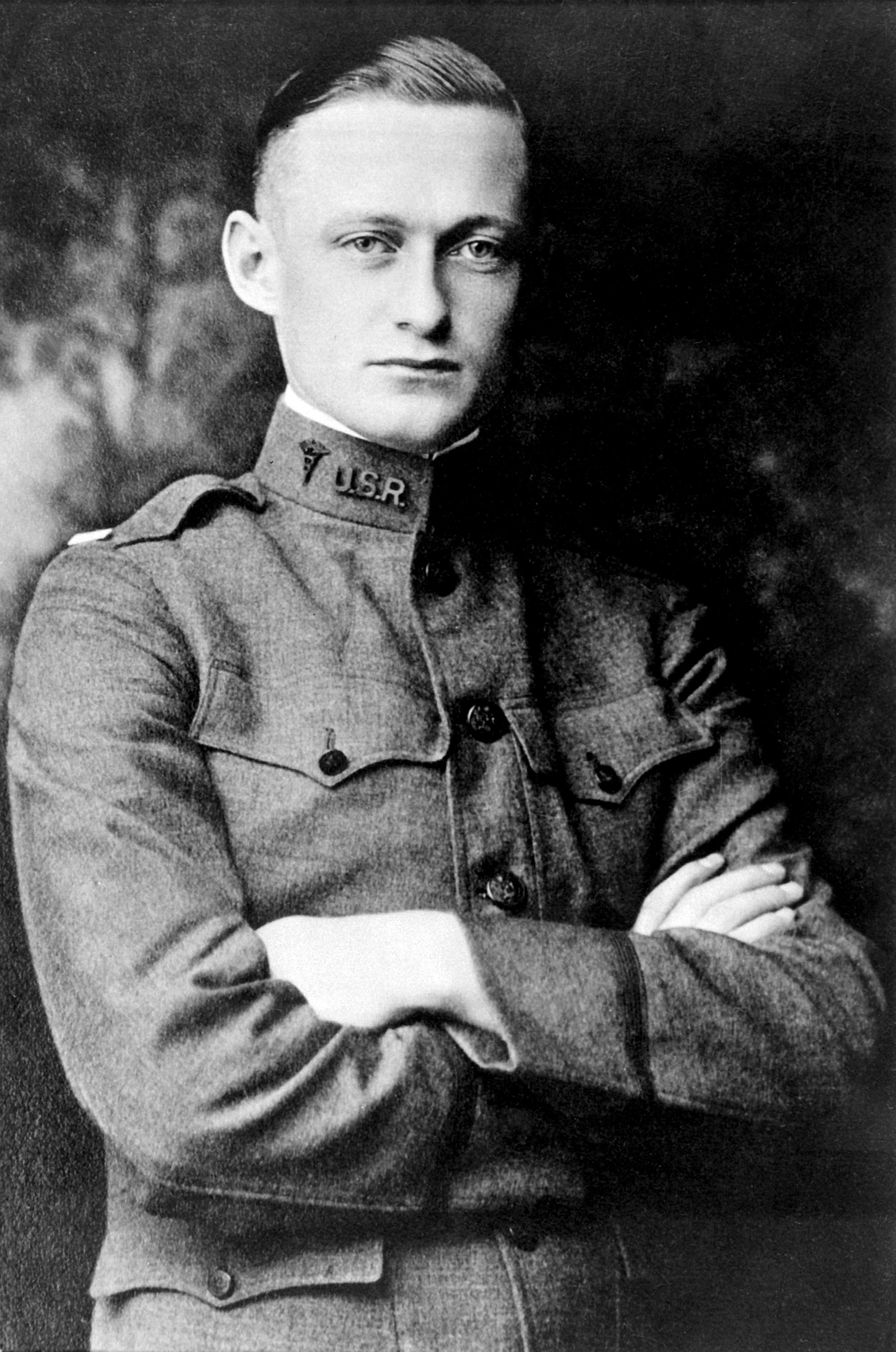
- Dr. William T. Fitzsimons as a lieutenant.
- Born: April 18, 1889; Burlington, Kansas, United States
- Died: September 4, 1917 (aged 28); Dannes-Camiers in Pas-de-Calais, France
- Burial place: Initially British cemetery at Etaples. Later reinterred in Grave 14, Row 9, Plot B, Somme American Cemetery and Memorial, Bony, Aisne, France
- Education: University of Kansas School of Medicine
- Military career
- Allegiance: United States
- Branch: United States Army
- Service years: 1912–1917
- Rank: Lieutenant
- Known for: First US officer killed in World War I
- Conflicts: World War I

Lieutenant William Thomas Fitzsimons (April 18, 1889 – September 4, 1917) was an American physician and United States Army officer in World War I, and is considered the first American officer killed in the war.

== Life ==
Grave at Somme American Cemetery

Fitzsimons was born in Burlington, Kansas on April 18, 1889 to J.I. and Catherine Fitzsimons. Fitzsimons graduated with a Doctor of Medicine degree from the in 1912 and was a member of the Beta Theta chapter of Nu Sigma Nu. When the U.S. entered World War I, Fitzsimons was called into active duty. He volunteered for overseas duty and left Kansas City on June 14, 1917. He was assigned to U.S. Army Base Hospital No. 5, which was associated with the British Expeditionary Forces near Dannes-Camiers, France.

Fitzsimons was killed in a German air raid on September 4, 1917, along with Pvt. Oscar Tugo, Pvt. Rudolph Rubino and Pvt. Leslie Woods, when bombs fell on Base Hospital No. 5 near Dannes-Camiers in Pas-de-Calais, France. He was buried in the afternoon of September 5, 1917, with full military honors in the British cemetery at Etaples along with the three enlisted men who also perished. Fitzsimons' body was later moved to Somme American Cemetery at Bony, Aisne, France.

== Legacy ==
On July 1, 1920, Army Hospital 21 in Aurora, Colorado was officially renamed the Fitzsimons Army Hospital in his honor by direction of the War Department.

In 1955, PFC Albert T. Beinar was commissioned to paint a portrait of Lt. Fitzsimons. His painting was unveiled by Mamie Eisenhower during the seven-week stay of Dwight Eisenhower's heart attack recovery.
