= Sidney Gordon =

Sidney Gordon may refer to:

- Sidney Gordon (businessman) (1917–2007), Scottish businessman
- Sid Gordon (1917–1975), American baseball player

== See also ==
- Bernard Sidney Gordon (1891–1963), Australian Army soldier and recipient of the Victoria Cross
