= Trinity-Pawling School =

Prep school in Pawling, New York, US

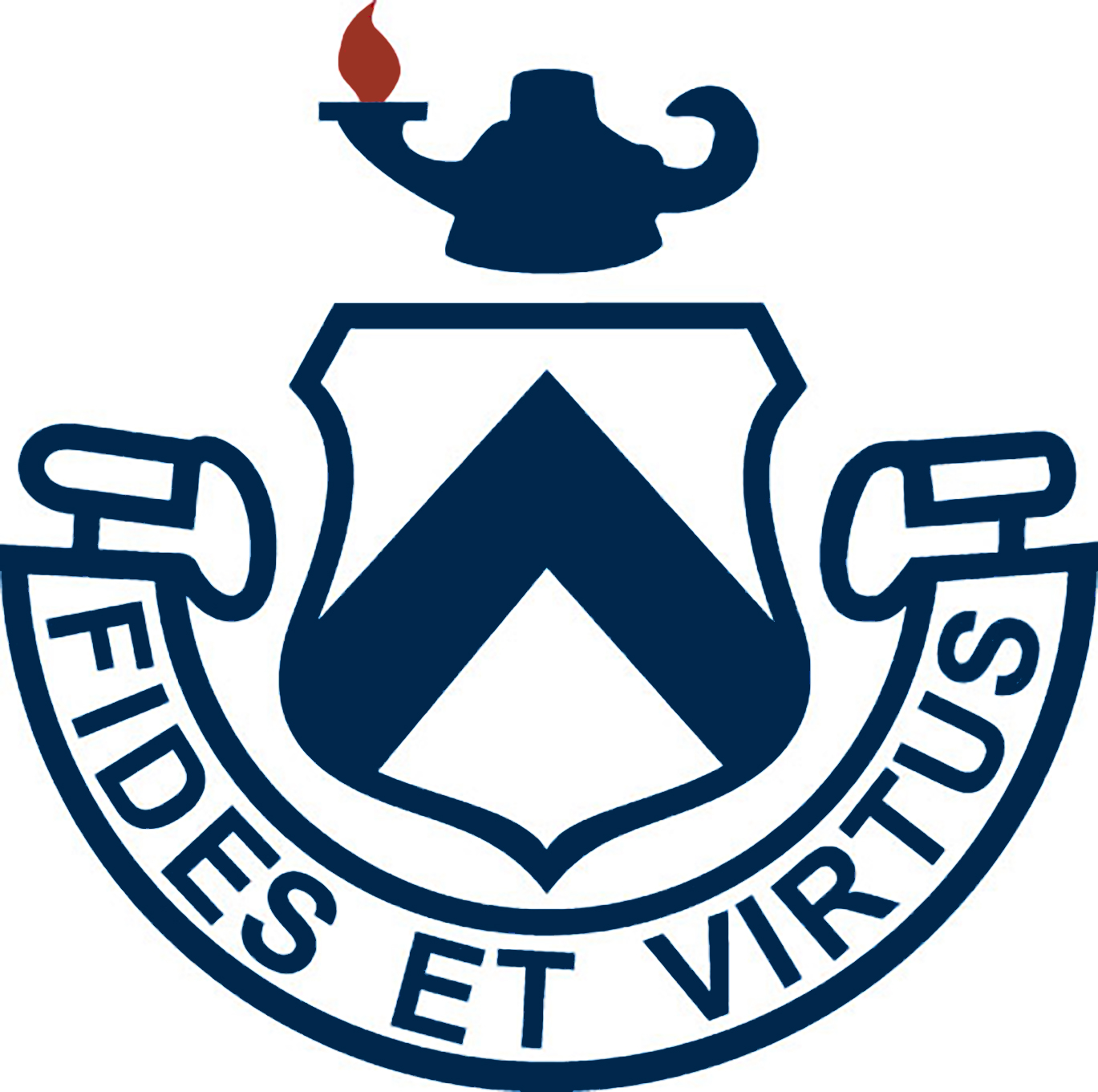

Location
- 700 Route 22; Pawling, Dutchess County, New York 12564; United States; 41°34′16.5″N 73°35′26.5″W

Information
- Former name: The Pawling School
- Type: Independent college-preparatory boarding & day school
- Motto: Latin: Fides et Virtus (Faith and Virtue)
- Religious affiliation: Christianity
- Denomination: Episcopal
- Established: 1907; 119 years ago
- Founder: Frederick Luther Gamage
- Status: Currently operational
- CEEB code: 334440
- Head of school: William W. Taylor
- Faculty: 65
- Grades: 7-12, and post-graduate; middle school available for day students
- Gender: All-boys
- Enrollment: 275
- Colors: Blue & gold
- Athletics conference: Founders' League
- Sports: 13
- Mascot: Lion
- Nickname: The Pride
- Teams: 34
- Newspaper: The Phoenix
- Annual tuition: $76,500
- Affiliation: TABS
- Website: trinitypawling.org
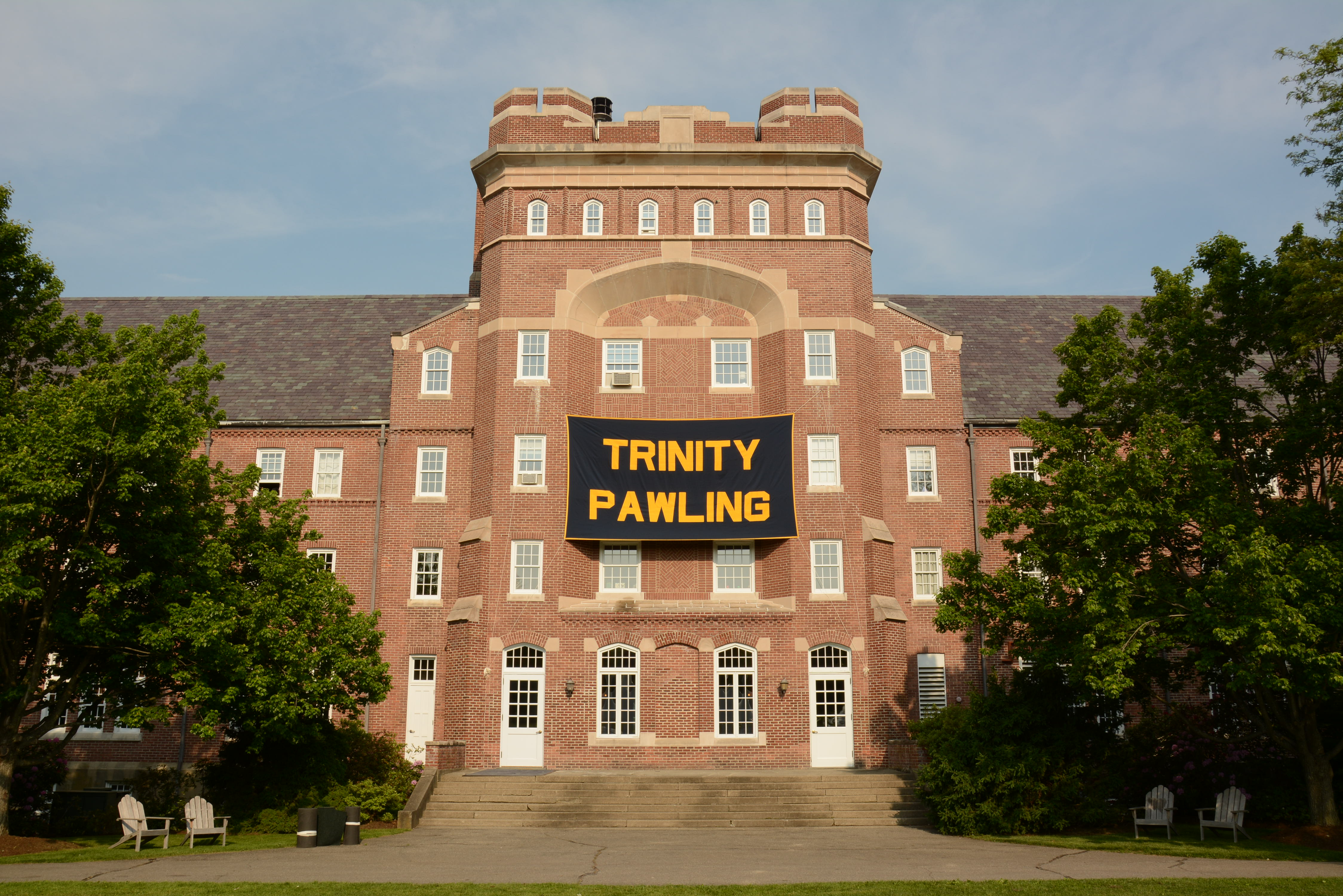
- Trinity-Pawling's main building

Trinity-Pawling School (formerly The Pawling School) is an independent, college-preparatory boarding school for boys in grades 7–12 and postgraduates, located in Pawling, New York, United States. The school, located on a 230-acre (93 ha) campus in southern Dutchess County, is located 60 miles (97 km) north of New York City.

== History ==
Trinity-Pawling School was founded in 1907 by Frederick Luther Gamage, previously headmaster of St. Paul's School. The first school building was Dutcher House, which had previously functioned as a hotel. Shortly after, George Bywater Cluett, who had previously donated money to Gamage for a gymnasium at St. Paul's, provided a larger grant for a new flagship building for the school that was then known as The Pawling School.

One of Trinity-Pawling's first students was William Bradford Turner, a descendant of the first Massachusetts Bay Colony Governor William Bradford. Turner was killed in action in World War I and was posthumously awarded the Medal of Honor.

In 1910, it moved to its present location on Route 22, in a new building designed by New York City architect Grosvenor Atterbury, named Cluett Hall.

The Pawling School was renamed Trinity-Pawling School in 1947.

== Extracurricular activities ==
=== Athletics ===
The school has 13 varsity sports competing against Founders League and non-league foes. The Founders League comprises Trinity-Pawling School, Kent, Taft, Avon, Hotchkiss, Choate, Kingswood-Oxford, Loomis Chaffee, and Westminster. Girls' schools in the league are Ethel Walker and Miss Porter's.

The school includes six soccer fields, a basketball court (Hubbard Court), a cardio room, and a weight room. The Rock Squash Courts opened in 1999, and the McGraw Wrestling Pavilion opened in 1998. The baseball field was renovated and named for Mo Vaughn, Class of 1986. An all-weather track was installed in 2006, and a grass football field remains on the west side of Route 22.

=== Arts ===
At Trinity-Pawling, all the arts are under one roof. The Gardiner Arts Center was formerly the school's gym from 1911 to 1960 and was used as an auditorium until 2002.

=== Clubs and activities ===
More than 50 clubs and extracurricular activities are offered to students each year. Some mainstays are Model UN, Diversity Club, Debate Club, Theater Tech Crew, Key Club (Admissions tour guides), and Film Club. Each student must participate in a club, program, or activity during their time at Trinity-Pawling.

=== Honor Code and Honor Council ===
The Honor Council is a student organization. Members are elected to the Honor Council by their peers and are responsible for upholding the Honor Code through personal example while educating the student body in honorable behavior. An honor pledge is signed by all students and faculty at the beginning of each academic year.

=== Traditions ===
Each year, the student body and faculty vote to name five to seven prefects to lead the student body. They are announced at the Stepping Up Ceremony, the school's internal graduation, the day before Commencement.

For chapel, the boys dress in "Blues and Grays", consisting of a blue blazer, gray pants, white shirts, and usually a blue and gold tie. Recently, the boys have adopted the bow tie as a go-to for these events and often regular class days. Class Dress is a blazer, tie, and traditional khaki-style pants with shoes. Usually, once a term, there will be a dress-down day to raise money for a charity or special cause. Neat Informal consists of a collared shirt with traditional khaki-style pants.

== Notable alumni ==
- John Agar – actor
- Mike Broderick – raconteur
- Andy Byron – business executive
- Ray Davis – NFL running back, Buffalo Bills
- Derek Dennis – football player
- Eric Drath – documentary director
- Sean Gleeson – American football coach
- Gil Junger – director
- Kirk McCaskill – retired MLB pitcher, hockey player
- Kevin McClatchy – former CEO of the Pittsburgh Pirates
- Robert Montgomery – actor
- Frank Morgan – actor
- George Murphy – Academy Award-winning actor, president of the Screen Actors Guild, and United States senator for California, 1964–1971
- Ian O'Boyle – athlete, basketball player, Manawatu Jets (NZ), Irish National team
- Chukky Okobi – NFL football player, Pittsburgh Steelers (2001–07, Super Bowl XL Champion)
- Wesley Oler – athlete, competed in the 1912 Summer Olympics
- Paul Rachman – filmmaker
- Bob Rafelson – film director
- Allison Whipple Rockefeller – activist
- Shayne Skov – athlete, linebacker, Stanford Cardinal team captain
- Charles Spencer – NFL player, Houston Texans
- William Bradford Turner – WWI US Army officer and Medal of Honor recipient
- Maurice Vaughn – MLB first baseman, three-time All-Star, AL MVP
- David Von Ancken – film, TV director, and screenwriter
- Leland Wilkinson – statistician and computer scientist

== Notable faculty ==
- Grieg Taber

=== Headmasters ===
- Dr. Frederick Luther Gamage (1907–1932) – founder and first headmaster of the original Pawling School
- Frederick L. Gamage, Jr. (1932–1935) – second headmaster, son of the founder
- Raphael "Rap" Shortlidge (1935–1943) – led the school through its transition prior to the temporary WWII closure
- Matthew E. Dann (1946–1970) – reopened the campus, establishing its connection with the Trinity School of NYC
- Phillips Smith (1970–1990) – oversaw the school's return to complete independence in 1978
- Archibald A. Smith III (1990–2015) – guided the campus through 25 years of extensive modernization
- William W. Taylor (2015–Present) – currently serving as the seventh head
