= Patrician Secondary School =

Coordinates: 53.18441537°N 6.7924336°W

- Meánscoil Phádraig
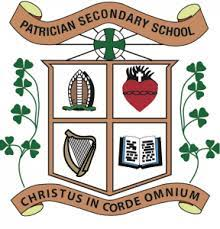
- Newbridge, County Kildare, Kildare, Leinster; Ireland

Information
- Motto: Ni Neart go cur le Cheile
- Established: 1960
- Founder: Mgr. William Miller, Patrician Brothers
- Status: Active
- Principal: Pat Moloney
- Chaplain: Fr. Paul Dempsey C.C.
- Colors: Navy and Yellow
- Athletics: Yes
- Nickname: PSS
- Website: www.PatricianSecondary.com

The Patrician Secondary School (Irish: Meánscoil Phádraig) in Newbridge, County Kildare was founded on 26 August 1958 by the Patrician Brothers in Charlotte House, Station Road. It is now situated on its own grounds, opposite St Conleth's Parish Church. It is an all-boys secondary school noted for the creative arts, sciences, and sports.

== Alumni ==
- Dónal Lunny (1947-2026) – folk musician and producer
- Ian O'Boyle (born 1984) – basketball player
- Dermot Early Jnr (born 1978) – former GAA player for Kildare and Sarsfields.
