= William B. Turner =

United States Army Medal of Honor recipient (1892–1918)

William Bradford Turner
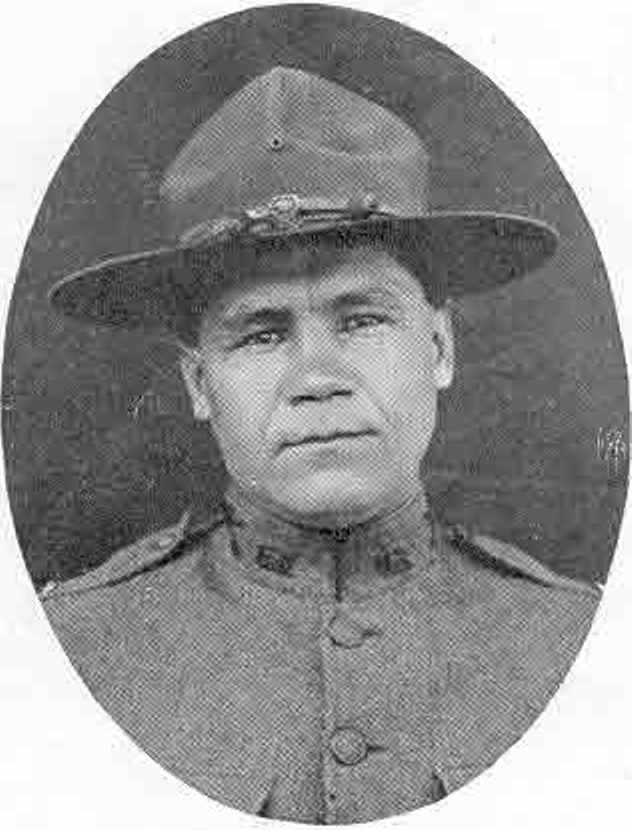
- Medal of Honor recipient
- Born: February 28, 1893; Boston, Massachusetts, US
- Died: September 27, 1918 (aged 25–26); Ronssoy, France
- Burial place: Somme American Cemetery and Memorial
- Military career
- Allegiance: United States
- Branch: United States Army
- Service years: 1915 – 1918
- Rank: First Lieutenant
- Units: 105th Infantry Regiment, 27th Division
- Conflicts: World War I
- Awards: Medal of Honor

William Bradford Turner (February 28, 1892 – September 27, 1918) was a United States Army officer who received the U.S. military's highest decoration, the Medal of Honor, for his actions in World War I.

Born in Boston, Massachusetts, Turner lived in Garden City, New York, and attended St. Paul's School there for one year. In 1907 he transferred to Trinity-Pawling School, which was founded by the former headmaster of St. Paul's, Dr. Frederick Luther Gamage. He was a graduate of Williams College, class of 1914, where he played football, basketball, and baseball. Turner is a direct descendant of the Europeans who settled New England in the early 1600s, including Massachusetts Governor William Bradford, and Dorothy Quincy, the wife of John Hancock.

Turner joined the New York National Guard in the fall of 1915 serving in Machine Gun Troop, A Squadron. Mobilized on June 19, 1916, he served as a private when his unit pulled duty on the Texas-Mexico border from mid-July to mid-December 1916. His unit returned to New York and was demobilized on December 28, 1916. Once the United States entered WWI, Turner was offered and accepted a commission as a lieutenant in the 12th New York Cavalry (redesignated the 105th Infantry once it was mobilized).

By September 27, 1918, he was serving in France as a first lieutenant with the 105th Infantry Regiment, 27th Division. During an attack on that night, near Ronssoy, he and a small group of others became separated from the rest of their company. Turner led the group forward despite intense artillery and machine gun fire, several times personally attacking machine gun positions which were firing on his men. Although wounded three times, he continued to lead the group forward, capturing and clearing three lines of trenches. After reaching their objective, a fourth line of trenches, Turner was killed while defending the position from a German counter-attack. For these actions, he was posthumously awarded the Medal of Honor the next year, in 1919.

Aged 25 or 26 at his death, Turner was buried in France at the Somme American Cemetery.

== Medal of Honor citation ==
Grave at Somme American Cemetery

Rank and organization: First Lieutenant, U.S. Army, Company M, 105th Infantry Regiment, 27th Division, American Expeditionary Forces. Born: 1882, Dorchester, Massachusetts. Action location: Ronssoy, France. Action date: September 27, 1918. War Department, General Orders No. 81 (June 26, 1919)

Citation:

He led a small group of men to the attack, under terrific artillery and machinegun fire, after they had become separated from the rest of the company in the darkness. Single-handed he rushed an enemy machinegun which had suddenly opened fire on his group and killed the crew with his pistol. He then pressed forward to another machinegun post twenty-five yards away and had killed one gunner himself by the time the remainder of his detachment arrived and put the gun out of action. With the utmost bravery he continued to lead his men over three lines of hostile trenches, cleaning up each one as they advanced, regardless of the fact that he had been wounded three times, and killed several of the enemy in hand-to-hand encounters. After his pistol ammunition was exhausted, this gallant officer seized the rifle of a dead soldier, bayoneted several members of a machinegun crew, and shot the other. Upon reaching the fourth line trench, which was his objective, Lieutenant Turner captured it with the nine men remaining in his group and resisted a hostile counterattack until he was finally surrounded and killed.

== Military awards ==
Turner's military decorations and awards include:

1st row	Medal of Honor	Mexican Border Service Medal		
2nd row	World War I Victory Medal w/one silver service star to denote credit for the Somme Offensive, Ypres-Lys, St. Mihiel, Meuse-Argonne and Defensive Sector battle clasps.		Croce al Merito di Guerra (Italy)	Medalha da Cruz de Guerra, Third Class (Portuguese Republic)

== See also ==
- List of Medal of Honor recipients for World War I
