= John Cridland Latham =

United States Army soldier (1888–1975)

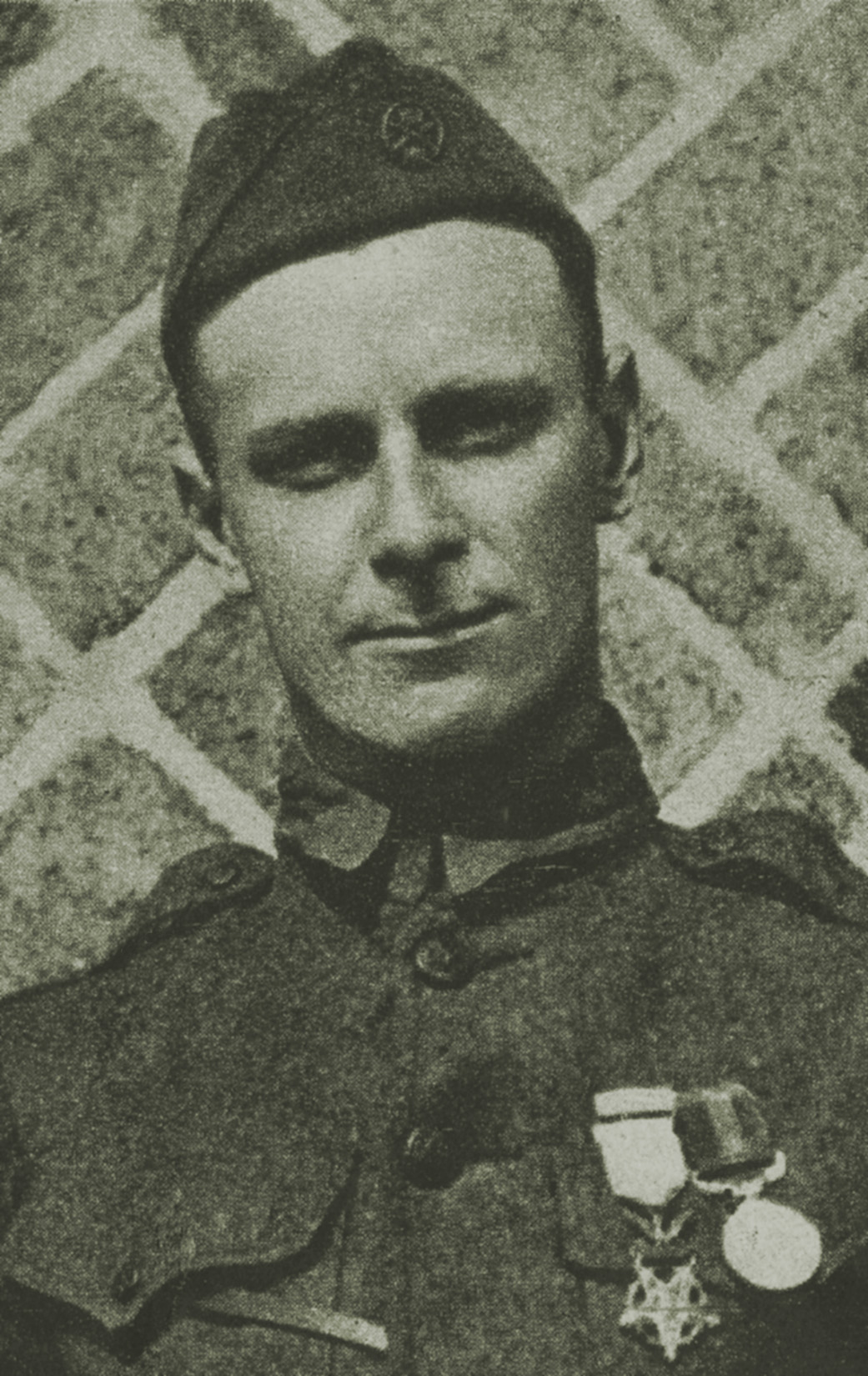
- Medal of Honor recipient
- Born: March 3, 1888; Windermere, England
- Died: November 5, 1975 (aged 87)
- Burial place: Arlington National Cemetery
- Military career
- Allegiance: United States
- Branch: United States Army
- Rank: Sergeant, later Warrant Officer
- Service number: 1212528
- Units: Machine Gun Company, 107th Infantry, 27th Division
- Awards: Medal of Honor; Purple Heart

John Cridland Latham (March 3, 1888 – November 5, 1975) was a United States Army soldier who received the U.S. military's highest decoration, the Medal of Honor, for his actions in World War I.

Born on March 3, 1888, in Windermere, England, Latham emigrated to the United States and joined the army in Rutherford, New Jersey. He served as a sergeant in Machine Gun Company, 107th Infantry Regiment, 27th Division. On September 29, 1918, near Le Catelet in northeastern France, he and two other soldiers, Sergeant Alan L. Eggers and Corporal Thomas E. O'Shea, left cover to rescue the crew of a disabled American tank. O'Shea was killed, but Latham and Eggers successfully defended the wounded tank crewmen from German fire all day and carried them to the safety of the Allied lines after nightfall. For this action, all three soldiers were awarded the Medal of Honor the next year.

== Medal of Honor Citation ==
- Rank and organization: Sergeant, United States Army, Machine Gun Company, 107th Infantry, 27th Division.
- Place and date: At Le Catelet, France, September 29, 1918.
- Entered service at: Rutherford, New Jersey
- Birth: Windermere, England
- General Orders: War Department, General Orders No. 20 (January 30, 1919).

=== Citation ===
Becoming separated from their platoon by a smoke barrage, Sergeant Latham, Sergeant Alan L. Eggers, and Corporal Thomas E. O'Shea took cover in a shell hole well within the enemy's lines. Upon hearing a call for help from an American tank which had become disabled 30 yards from them, the three soldiers left their shelter and started toward the tank under heavy fire from German machineguns and trench mortars. In crossing the fire-swept area, Corporal O'Shea was mortally wounded, but his companions, undeterred, proceeded to the tank, rescued a wounded officer, and assisted two wounded soldiers to cover in the sap of a nearby trench. Sergeants Latham and Eggers then returned to the tank in the face of the violent fire, dismounted a Hotchkiss gun, and took it back to where the wounded men were keeping off the enemy all day by effective use of the gun and later bringing it with the wounded men back to our lines under cover of darkness.

== Military Awards ==
Latham's military decorations and awards include:

1st row	Medal of Honor	Purple Heart	World War I Victory Medal w/three bronze service stars to denote credit for the Somme Offensive, Ypres-Lys and Defensive Sector battle clasps.
2nd row	Distinguished Conduct Medal (Great Britain)	Médaille militaire (French Republic)	Croix de guerre 1914–1918 w/bronze palm (French Republic)
3rd row	Croce al Merito di Guerra (Italy)	Medal for Military Bravery (Kingdom of Montenegro)	Medalha da Cruz de Guerra, Third Class (Portuguese Republic)

== See also ==
- List of Medal of Honor recipients for World War I
