= Thomas E. O'Shea =

United States Army corporal

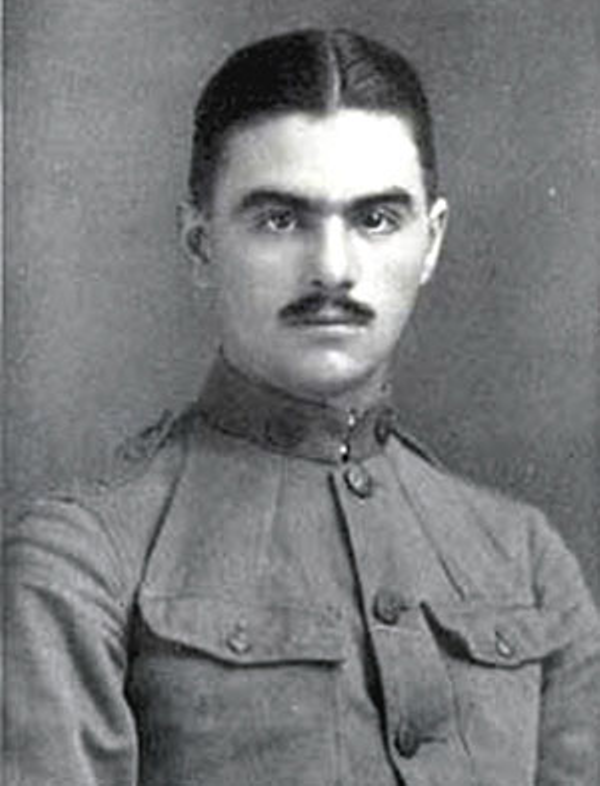
- Medal of Honor recipient
- Born: April 18, 1895; New York City, US
- Died: September 29, 1918 (aged 23) near Le Catelet, France
- Burial place: Somme American Cemetery and Memorial
- Military career
- Allegiance: United States of America
- Branch: United States Army
- Rank: Corporal
- Service number: 1212577
- Units: O'Ryan's Roughneck's Machine Gun Company, 107th Infantry, 27th Division
- Awards: Medal of Honor

Thomas E. O'Shea (April 18, 1895 – September 29, 1918) was a United States Army corporal during World War I. He was killed by Germans while trying to rescue others near Le Catelet, France on September 29, 1918. He posthumously received the Medal of Honor for his heroic actions. O'Shea was a resident of Summit, New Jersey.

O'Shea is buried at Somme American Cemetery and Memorial in Picardy, northern France.

== Medal of Honor citation ==
Grave at Somme American Cemetery

- Rank and organization: Corporal, U.S. Army, Machine Gun Company, 107th Infantry, 27th Division.
- Place and date: Near Le Catelet, France, 29 September 1918.
- Entered service at: Summit, New Jersey.
- Birth: New York City, New York.
- General Orders No.20. War Department, January 30, 1919.

Citation:

Becoming separated from their platoon by a smoke barrage, Cpl. O'Shea, with 2 other soldiers, took cover in a shell hole well within the enemy's lines. Upon hearing a call for help from an American tank, which had become disabled 30 yards from them, the 3 soldiers left their shelter and started toward the tank under heavy fire from German machineguns and trench mortars. In crossing the fire-swept area Cpl. O'Shea was mortally wounded and died of his wounds shortly afterwards.

== Military awards ==
O'Shea's military decorations and awards include:

1st row	Medal of Honor	Purple Heart	World War I Victory Medal w/three bronze service stars to denote credit for the Somme Offensive, Ypres-Lys and Defensive Sector battle clasps.	
2nd row	Distinguished Conduct Medal (Great Britain)		Médaille militaire (French Republic)	Croix de guerre 1914–1918 w/bronze palm (French Republic)
3rd row	Croce al Merito di Guerra (Italy)		Medal for Military Bravery (Kingdom of Montenegro)	Medalha da Cruz de Guerra, Third Class (Portuguese Republic)

== See also ==
- John Cridland Latham
- Alan Louis Eggers
- List of Medal of Honor recipients for World War I

== Sources ==
- "The United States Army Center of Military History, World War I Medal of Honor recipients".
