= Alan Louis Eggers =

US Army sergeant and Medal of Honor recipient (1895–1968)

Alan L. Eggers
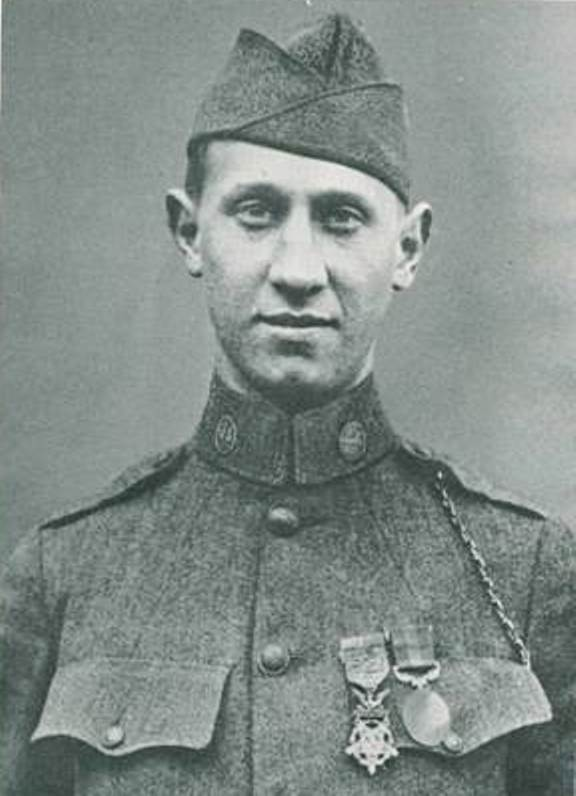
- Medal of Honor recipient
- Born: November 2, 1895; Saranac Lake, New York
- Died: October 3, 1968 (aged 72)
- Burial place: Arlington National Cemetery
- Military career
- Allegiance: United States of America
- Branch: United States Army
- Rank: Sergeant
- Units: Machine Gun Company, 107th Infantry, 27th Division
- Awards: Medal of Honor; Purple Heart

Alan Louis Eggers (November 2, 1895 – October 3, 1968) was a sergeant in the United States Army during World War I. He received the Medal of Honor for his heroic actions in combat near Le Catelet, France, on September 29, 1918, together with John C. Latham and Thomas E. O'Shea. Eggers was a student at Cornell University before departing for service. He was awarded the degree of "War Alumnus" in 1921.

He was buried at Arlington National Cemetery, in Arlington, Virginia.

== Medal of Honor citation ==
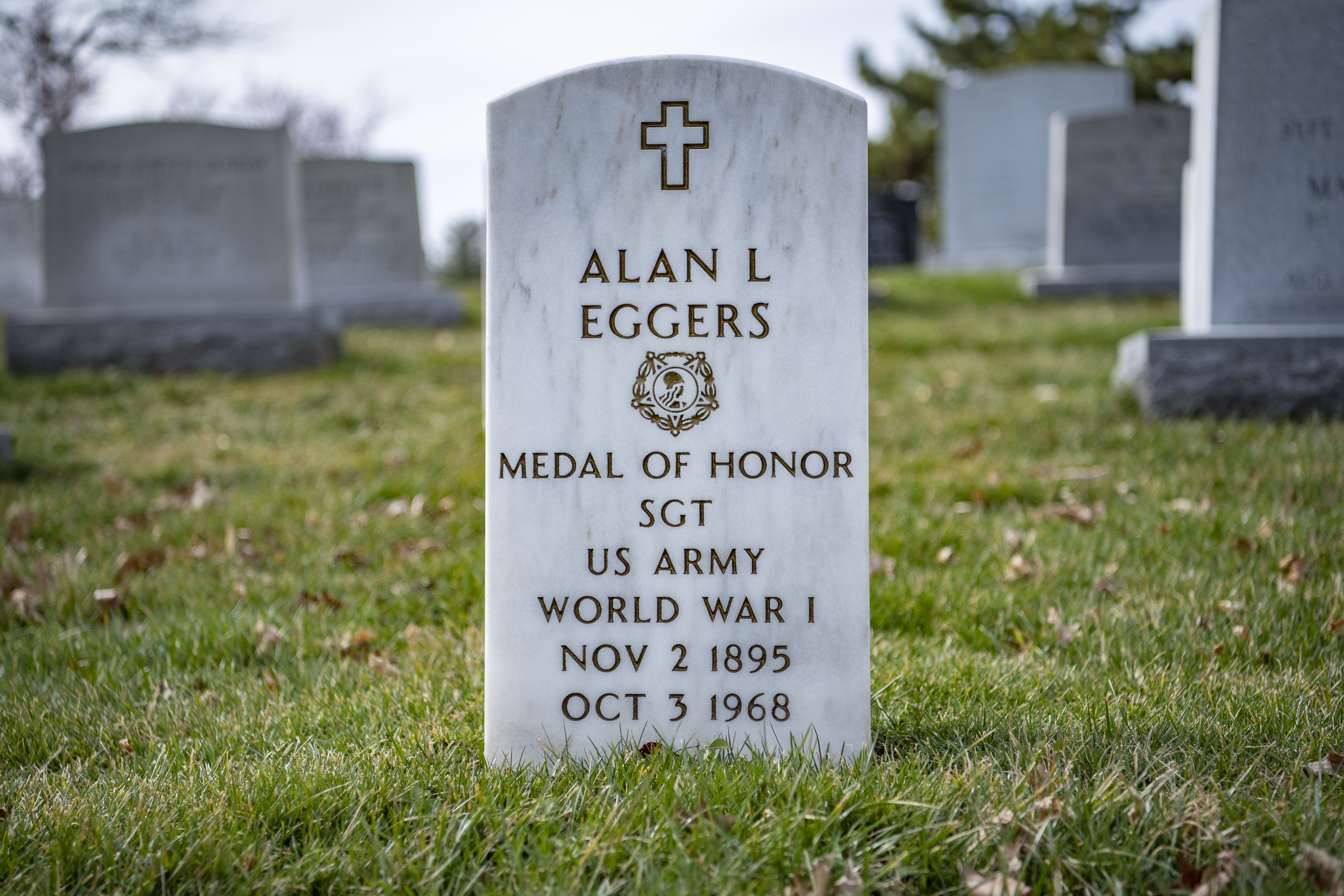
Grave at Arlington National Cemetery.

- Rank and organization: Sergeant, United States Army, Machine Gun Company, 107th Infantry, 27th Division.
- Place and date: Near Le Catelet, France, September 29, 1918.
- Entered service at: Summit, New Jersey.
- Birth: Saranac Lake, New York.
- General Orders: War Department, General Orders No. 20 (January 30, 1919).

Citation:

Becoming separated from their platoon by a smoke barrage, Sergeant Eggers, Sergeant John C. Latham and Corporal Thomas E. O'Shea took cover in a shell hole well within the enemy's lines. Upon hearing a call for help from an American tank, which had become disabled 30 yards from them, the three soldiers left their shelter and started toward the tank, under heavy fire from German machineguns and trench mortars. In crossing the fire-swept area Corporal O'Shea was mortally wounded, but his companions, undeterred, proceeded to the tank, rescued a wounded officer, and assisted two wounded soldiers to cover in a sap of a nearby trench. Sergeant Eggers and Sergeant Latham then returned to the tank in the face of the violent fire, dismounted a Hotchkiss gun, and took it back to where the wounded men were, keeping off the enemy all day by effective use of the gun and later bringing it, with the wounded men, back to our lines under cover of darkness.

== Military awards ==
Eggers' military decorations and awards include:

1st row	Medal of Honor	Purple Heart	World War I Victory Medal w/three bronze service stars to denote credit for the Somme Offensive, Ypres-Lys and Defensive Sector battle clasps.
2nd row	Distinguished Conduct Medal (Great Britain)	Médaille militaire (French Republic)	Croix de guerre 1914–1918 w/bronze palm (French Republic)
3rd row	Croce al Merito di Guerra (Italy)	Medal for Military Bravery (Kingdom of Montenegro)	Medalha da Cruz de Guerra, Third Class (Portuguese Republic)

== See also ==
- List of Medal of Honor recipients for World War I
- Thomas E. O'Shea
- John Cridland Latham
