= KUBS Basketball Club =

- Founded: 2007
- Arena: Carroll Arena
- Location: Greendale, Dublin, Ireland
- Team colors: Red, black, white
- Website: KUBS.ie

KUBS Basketball Club is an Irish basketball club based in Dublin. The club's senior men's representative team previously played in Ireland's top national league, the Super League.

== History ==
KUBS Basketball Club was established in 2007, in association with Killester United FC. In 2015, the club entered a senior men's representative team into Basketball Ireland's National League Division 1 competition. In their inaugural season, KUBS finished runners-up with a 14–4 record and claimed the post-season League Cup trophy.

In May 2016, KUBS was elevated into the Super League for the 2016–17 season. In July 2018, the team was demoted back down to the National League Division 1.
