= Robert L. Blackwell =

United States Army Medal of Honor recipient

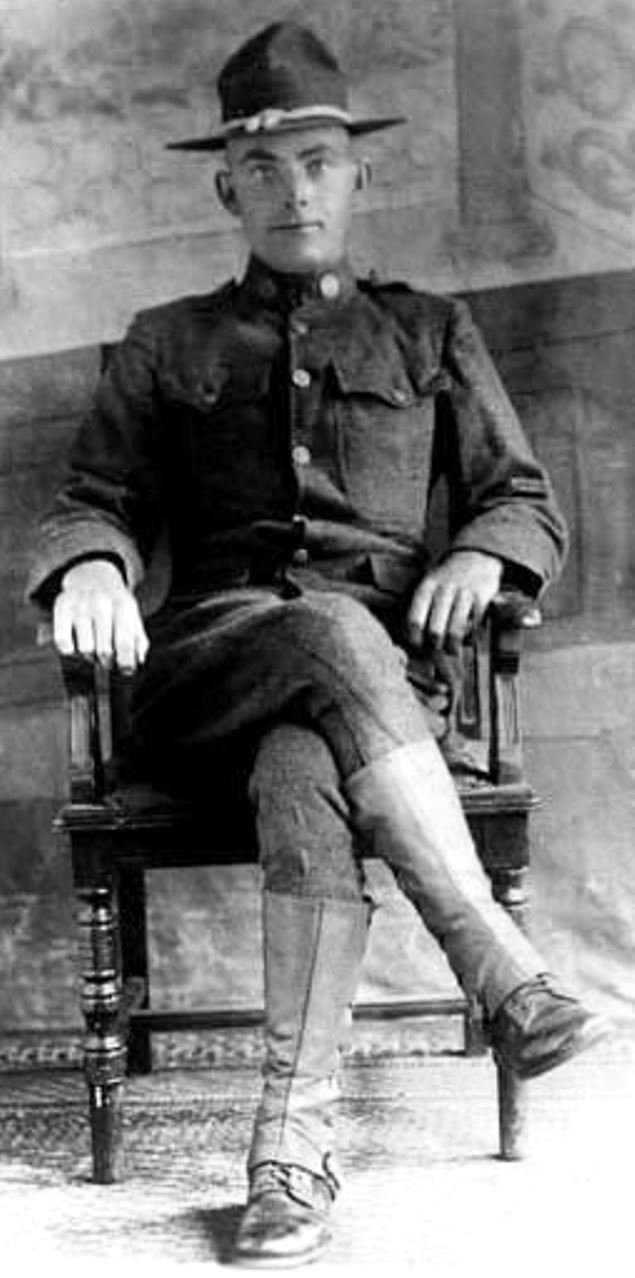
- Medal of Honor recipient Robert L. Blackwell
- Born: October 4, 1895; Person County, North Carolina, U.S.
- Died: October 11, 1918 (aged 23); Saint-Souplet, France
- Burial place: Somme American Cemetery and Memorial
- Military career
- Allegiance: United States of America
- Branch: United States Army
- Service years: 1917–1918
- Rank: Private
- Service number: 1316563
- Units: K Company, 119th Infantry Regiment, 30th Infantry Division
- Conflicts: World War I
- Awards: Medal of Honor (USA); Croce al Merito di Guerra (Italy); War Cross (Class III) (Note: Portuguese: Cruz de Guerra Class III – Device is a silver cross) (Portugal)

Robert Lester Blackwell (October 4, 1895 – October 11, 1918) was an American soldier who posthumously received the Medal of Honor during World War I. He was born in the vicinity of Hurdle Mills, in Person County, North Carolina, to James B. and Eugenia Blackwell. Robert's father was originally from nearby Orange County, and was a Confederate Civil War veteran; his mother died when he was young. Blackwell was raised on his family's farm, and entered the Army from Hurdle Mills.

== Biography ==
He was born on October 4, 1895.

He was assigned to Company K, 119th Infantry, 30th Division. He was one of two soldiers from North Carolina to be awarded the Medal of Honor for service in the First World War.

He is buried in Somme American Cemetery and Memorial, Somme Picardie, France. His grave can be found in plot D, row 20, grave 2. Robert's father received the medal May 6, 1919, from North Carolina Governor Thomas Bickett in a ceremony in the North Carolina State Capitol. The family later donated the medal to what is now the North Carolina Museum of History.

== Honors ==
A statue to honor his heroism stands today in Roxboro, North Carolina, and shortly after World War I there was the Robert Lester Blackwell American Legion Post No. 138 in Roxboro, North Carolina.

== Medal of Honor citation ==
Grave at Somme American Cemetery

Rank and organization: Private, U.S. Army, Company K, 119th Infantry, 30th Division. Place and date: Near St. Souplet, France, October 11, 1918. Entered service at: Hurdle Mills, N.C. Birth: Person County, N.C. G.O. No.: 13, W.D., 1919.

Citation:

When his platoon was almost surrounded by the enemy and his platoon commander asked for volunteers to carry a message calling for reinforcements, Pvt. Blackwell volunteered for this mission, well knowing the extreme danger connected with it. In attempting to get through the heavy shell and machinegun fire this gallant soldier was killed.

== See also ==
- List of Medal of Honor recipients
- List of Medal of Honor recipients for World War I
