= Robert Blackwell Jr. =

American businessman

Robert Blackwell Jr. is an American businessman based in Chicago. Described as "a savvy and successful entrepreneur", he is the founder and CEO of EKI-Digital, a technology consulting firm. He is also the CEO of Killerspin, a manufacturer of table tennis equipment that hosts internationally televised tournaments. Blackwell is a former employer of then-state Senator Barack Obama, as well as a political supporter and personal friend of Obama.

== Companies ==
=== EKI-Digital ===
Blackwell founded EKI-Digital in 1998. (EKI stands for "Electronic Knowledge Interchange"). His purpose was to help companies, government agencies and healthcare organizations “to streamline their business processes through technology.”

EKI was a finalist for the Illinois Technology Association's Momentum Awards.

=== Killerspin ===
The Chicago Tribune's Blue Sky Vault innovation site describes Blackwell's ping pong company, Killerspin, as "a table tennis equipment and lifestyle company". Killerspin specializes in table tennis, running tournaments across the country and "selling its own line of equipment and apparel and DVD recordings of the competitions".

According to Blue Sky Vault, "[Blackwell] has been playing Ping-Pong since he was a teenager, when his father bought a set for their basement".

He founded the company in 2003.

In the early 2000s, Killerspin hosted a ping-pong tournament that was broadcast internationally. It reached as many as 200 million viewers in over 150 countries.

=== Others ===
In addition to EKI-Digital and Killerspin, Blackwell founded a number of other companies. Those include Urban Fishing Development, Bytewise International and Blackwell Consulting Services.

== Table tennis ==
In 2012, during a business trip to Nigeria, Blackwell met with the Nigerian president at the presidential palace and had dinner with the finance minister. Other prominent Nigerian politicians and business people were also in attendance. While at the dinner, Blackwell noticed a large number of ping-pong tables. He "was pleasantly surprised to learn the Nigerian officials also played table tennis."

A Nigerian artist challenged him to a game. Blackwell told Crain's Chicago Business that he would gladly accept the challenge when he returned to Nigeria a few months later.

=== Pope Francis ===
In May 2016, Blackwell presented Pope Francis with a customized ping-pong table for the Vatican. As Crain's Chicago Business put it, "Here's one way to get more people playing pingpong religiously: Get the pope on your side."

Blackwell planned a table tennis showcase hosted by his company Killerspin called the "World Unplug and Play Day" in Vatican City in August 2016. The governing body of Italian table tennis came up with the idea to encourage ping-pong playing as a way to get people away from "technology-induced isolation."

== Boards and committees ==
Blackwell serves on several boards and commissions and has been a member of several Chicago-based organizations:

- Business Leadership Council (member)
- Chicago Board of Trade (past member)
- Chicago Mercantile Exchange (past member)
- Chicago Sports Commission (Vice Chairman)
- Choose Chicago (executive committee)
- Chicagoland Chamber of Commerce's Technology Committee (Chairman)
- Chicagoland Entrepreneurial Center (board member)
- Executive's Club of Chicago (member)

== Relationship with Barack Obama ==
Blackwell has had a relationship with President Barack Obama throughout Obama's career, since Obama's early days as an Illinois state senator. Blackwell supported Obama politically, but they were personal friends as well. They both lived on Chicago's South side.

Blackwell was a fundraiser for Obama's first presidential campaign, raising between $100,000 and $200,000.

Obama ran for Congress in 2000 and lost the race. After that he "faced serious financial pressure". Blackwell gave Obama a job giving legal advice to EKI for $8000 per month. "Blackwell said he had no knowledge of Obama's finances and hired Obama solely based on his abilities", according to the Los Angeles Times.

In 2002, state Senator Obama sent a letter to Illinois state officials on behalf of EKI requesting a $50,000 tourism promotion grant for a table tennis tournament. Other politicians including Senator Dick Durbin and Chicago Mayor Richard Daley also offered support for the table tennis tournament. The grant ended up being only $20,000.

Obama's presidential campaign, when asked about it, said it that there was no connection between Obama's legal work for Blackwell in his help with the grant. Obama's adviser David Axelrod said, "Any implication that Sen. Obama would risk an ethical breach in order to secure a small grant for a pingpong tournament is nuts." According to the Los Angeles Times, "Today, Illinois Tourism Director Jan Kosner lauds the state's decision to support the table tennis tourneys and dismisses the role that letters from politicians play in the grant-making process."

The Los Angeles Times wrote,

An Illinois ethics advocate who worked with Obama to pass state ethics reforms, Cynthia Canary, said she was not troubled by Obama's handling of the Blackwell business. She said his listing of all the law firm's clients "was a more complete disclosure than you see 80% of the time in Illinois." Further, she said that Obama's letter on behalf of the table tennis tournament did not "rise to the level of a conflict of interest" because Obama did not have decision-making authority over the grant.
