= Bernard Gordon (soldier) =

Australian soldier

Bernard Gordon VC MM
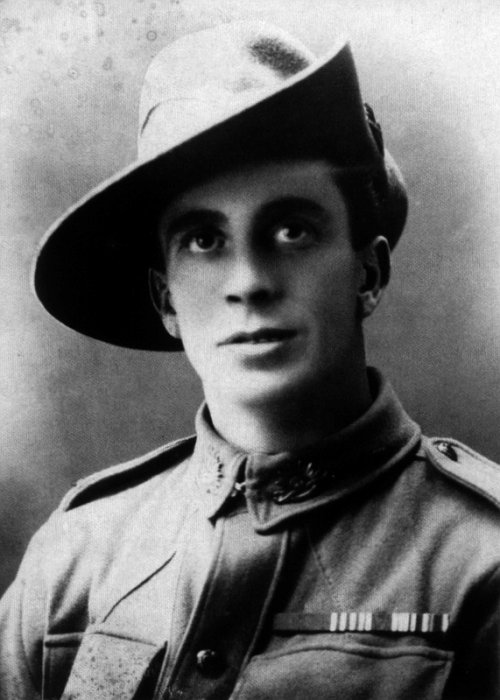
- Lance Corporal Bernard Gordon, c. 1919
- Born: 16 August 1891; Launceston, Tasmania
- Died: 19 October 1963 (aged 72); Torquay, Queensland
- Military career
- Allegiance: Australia
- Branch: Australian Imperial Force
- Service years: 1915–1919
- Rank: Lance Corporal
- Conflicts: First World War; Western Front; Battle of Hamel; Battle of Amiens; Battle of Mont St Quentin
- Awards: Victoria Cross; Military Medal

Bernard Sidney Gordon, VC, MM (16 August 1891 – 19 October 1963) was an Australian recipient of the Victoria Cross during the First World War, the highest award for gallantry in the face of the enemy that can be awarded to British and Commonwealth forces.

== First World War ==
Gordon was 27 years old, and acting as a Lance Corporal in the 41st Battalion, Australian Imperial Force when, during the Battle of Amiens, the following deeds leading to him being awarded the Military Medal occurred.

On the 8/8/18 during the attack east of Hamel Pte Gordon single-handedly attacked a machine gun crew which was holding up his section. He killed the crew and captured the gun. Later on in the day he stalked and killed an enemy sniper.

Throughout the operation he displayed much bravery and devotion to duty.

Brigadier General J.H. Cannan, 11th Brigade AIF

This action occurred on the "Black Day" of the German Army, in which the Australian Corps destroyed their opposition. As a result of this, on 9 August 1918 the Canadian Corps advance lead to a general retreat by the German troops. The Australian 3rd Division continued to advance toward the bend in the River Somme. During this period the following action, for which Gordon was awarded the Victoria Cross, took place:

During the operations of the 26/27th August 1918 East of Bray this N.C.O showed most conspicuous gallantry and devotion to duty in the face of the enemy.

He led his Section through heavy enemy shelling to the objective which he consolidated. Then single handed he attacked an enemy machine gun which was enfilading the Company on his right, killing the man on the gun and captured the post which contained one Officer (a Captain) and 10 men. After handing these over at Company Headquarters he returned alone to the old system of trenches, in which were many machine guns, entered a C.T. and proceeded to mop it up, returning with 15 prisoners in one squad and 14 in an other, together with two machine guns.

Again he returned to the system, this time with a T.M. gun and crew, and proceeded to mop up a further portion of the trench, bringing in 22 prisoners including one Officer and 3 Machine guns. This last capture enabled the British troops on our left to advance, which they had not been able to do owing to Machine Gun fire from these posts.

His total captures were thus 2 Officers and 61 other ranks, together with 6 machine guns, and with the exception of the Trench Mortar assistance it was absolutely an individual effort and done entirely on his own initiative.

Brigadier General J.H. Cannan, 11th Brigade AIF

Gordon was wounded on 1 September 1918 (Bouchavesnes Spur – Battle of Mont St Quentin). He was evacuated and sent to England on 4 September 1918, where he was awarded the Military Medal on 15 September 1918. He was not awarded the Victoria Cross until 20 December 1918 (after the Armistice), the citation for which states:

His Majesty the KING has been graciously pleased to approve the award of the Victoria Cross to the undermentioned Officers, N.C.O.'s and Men:-

No.23 L/Cpl. Bernard Sidney Gordon, M.M, 41st Bn., A.I.F.

For most conspicuous bravery and devotion to duty on the 26/27th August, 1918, east of Bray.

He led his section through heavy shell fire to the objective, which he consolidated. Single-handed he attacked an enemy machine gun which was enfilading the company on his right, killed the man on and captured the post, which contained one officer and ten men. He then cleared up a trench, capturing twenty-nine prisoners and two machine guns. In clearing up further trenches he captured twenty-two prisoners, including one officer and three machine guns.

Practically unaided, he captured, in the course of these operations, two officers and sixty-one other ranks, together with six machine guns, and displayed throughout a wonderful example of fearless initiative.

== Sale of his medal ==
Gordon's Victoria Cross was sold at auction in Sydney on 28 November 2006 for A$478,000. The medal was sold by one of Gordon's daughters, who needed money to keep the family farm in operation. The VC was purchased by an agent of media tycoon Kerry Stokes, the same man who paid a world record price of A$1 million in July 2006 for the VC awarded to Alfred Shout, A$180,000 for the George Cross of Lieutenant Commander George Gosse, and in conjunction with the South Australian Government, the VC of Major Peter Badcoe. All four medals are on display at the Australian War Memorial in Canberra.

== Legacy ==
A successor unit to his 41st Battalion AIF, the 41st Battalion, Royal New South Wales Regiment, continues to honour the memory of Lance Corporal Gordon VC MM. An annual Mess Dinner is held in his honour during August on the anniversary of his heroic actions. On the 7th of September, 2024, a new barracks facility was opened in Chinderah, New South Wales and was named as the Gordon VC Multi User Depot, for the use by the 41st Battalion.
