= Swords Thunder =

- Leagues: Super League
- Founded: 2011
- Dissolved: 2019
- History: Dublin Thunder; 2011–2013; Swords Thunder; 2013–2019
- Arena: ALSAA Sports Complex
- Location: Dublin Airport, Dublin
- Team colors: Red, black, white

Swords Thunder was an Irish basketball team based in Dublin. The team competed in the Super League and played its home games at the ALSAA Sports Complex.

== History ==
=== Dublin Thunder ===
In 2010, Dublin Thunder Basketball Club was founded. The following year, founder member Dave Baker became the inaugural coach of club's senior men's representative team. Aligned with Dublin Business School, Baker applied for national league status, but rulings required them to have played at least one year at local level before playing in the national league. With the Dublin league being full, Dublin Thunder entered the European Friendly Basketball League (EFBL). Between July 2011 and January 2012, they went unbeaten in the EFBL. They also boasted a friendly record of 27–1, having played 28 games against four American colleges, a pro team from the Philippines and five SuperLeague teams. On 27 January 2012, Dublin Thunder won the Basketball Ireland Senior Men's National Cup with an 87–45 win over UCD Marian in the final.

For the 2012–13 season, Thunder entered the National League Division 1.

=== Swords Thunder ===
For the 2013–14 season, the team was renamed Swords Thunder after Dublin Thunder Basketball Club linked with Swords Basketball Club. They went on to finish runners-up in the National League Division 1 while securing the Three Nations Cup title in Lecce, Italy.

For the 2014–15 season, Swords Thunder entered the Premier League and finished as regular season runners-up.

In the 2015–16 season, Thunder made their maiden final appearance in the Hula Hoops Men's National Cup, where they lost 78–75 to Templeogue.

In the 2016–17 season, Thunder won the Hula Hoops Men's National Cup with a 72–51 victory over Killester in the final. They also finished as regular season runners-up for the second time in three years.

In February 2019, Swords Thunder disbanded and withdrew from the Super League midway through the 2018–19 season. The team began the season relatively well and were in third spot in November, but after founder and coach Dave Baker began suffering with health problems, the team started to fall apart and its relationship with main sponsor Griffith College began to weaken.
