= Ulster University Basketball =

Ulster University
- Founded: 2005
- History: University of Ulster; 2005–2008; Ulster Elks; 2008–2020; Ulster University; 2021–
- Arena: Ulster University Sports Centre
- Location: Jordanstown, Northern Ireland
- Team colors: Navy, white, gold

Ulster University is an Irish men's basketball team based in Jordanstown, Northern Ireland. The team has competed in the Irish Super League and National League Division 1 and play its home games at the Ulster University Sports Centre.

== History ==
The University of Ulster at Jordanstown Men's Basketball Club was founded in 1984. Previously, Ulster Polytechnic occupied the Jordanstown site and had a very strong tradition in men's collegiate basketball. UUJ experienced the greatest success out of the four UU campuses at collegiate level in men's and women's basketball, with six Men's Irish intervarsity championships won during the 1990s and early 2000s.

In 2005, UU appointed Andrew O'Hare as full-time Basketball Development Officer. This led to the development of a UU Basketball Management Board, a range of junior partner clubs, a satellite development programme, residential and day camps, intramural basketball, basketball scholarships and the transition of UU into Basketball Ireland national competitions. Between 2005 and 2007, the University of Ulster competed in the National League Division 1.

In 2007, the team entered the Irish SuperLeague for the first time. The team was renamed Ulster Elks for the 2008–09 season. In January 2011, Elks made their first appearance in a National Cup semi-final.

Following the 2010–11 season, Elks withdrew from the SuperLeague and joined the Basketball Northern Ireland Premier League for the 2011–12 season. For the 2012–13 season, the Patrick O'Neill-coached Elks returned to the National League Division 1, but also competed in the Ulster Premier League and Division 1 of the Universities league. They went on to win the 2013 National League D1 Northern Conference championship.

Elks continued on in the Northern Ireland Premier League between 2013 and 2016 before re-entering the National League Division 1 for the 2016–17 season. They continued on in the National League Division 1 in 2017–18, 2018–19 and 2019–20. The Elks name was discontinued in 2020.

In 2021, the Ulster University men's basketball team continued in the Division 1. In 2022–23, Ulster University won the Division One championship and earned promotion to the Super League. The team spent the 2023–24 season in the Super League before returning to the Division 1 for the 2024–25 season.
