= Somme American Cemetery and Memorial =

ABCM World War I cemetery in Picardie, France

- United States
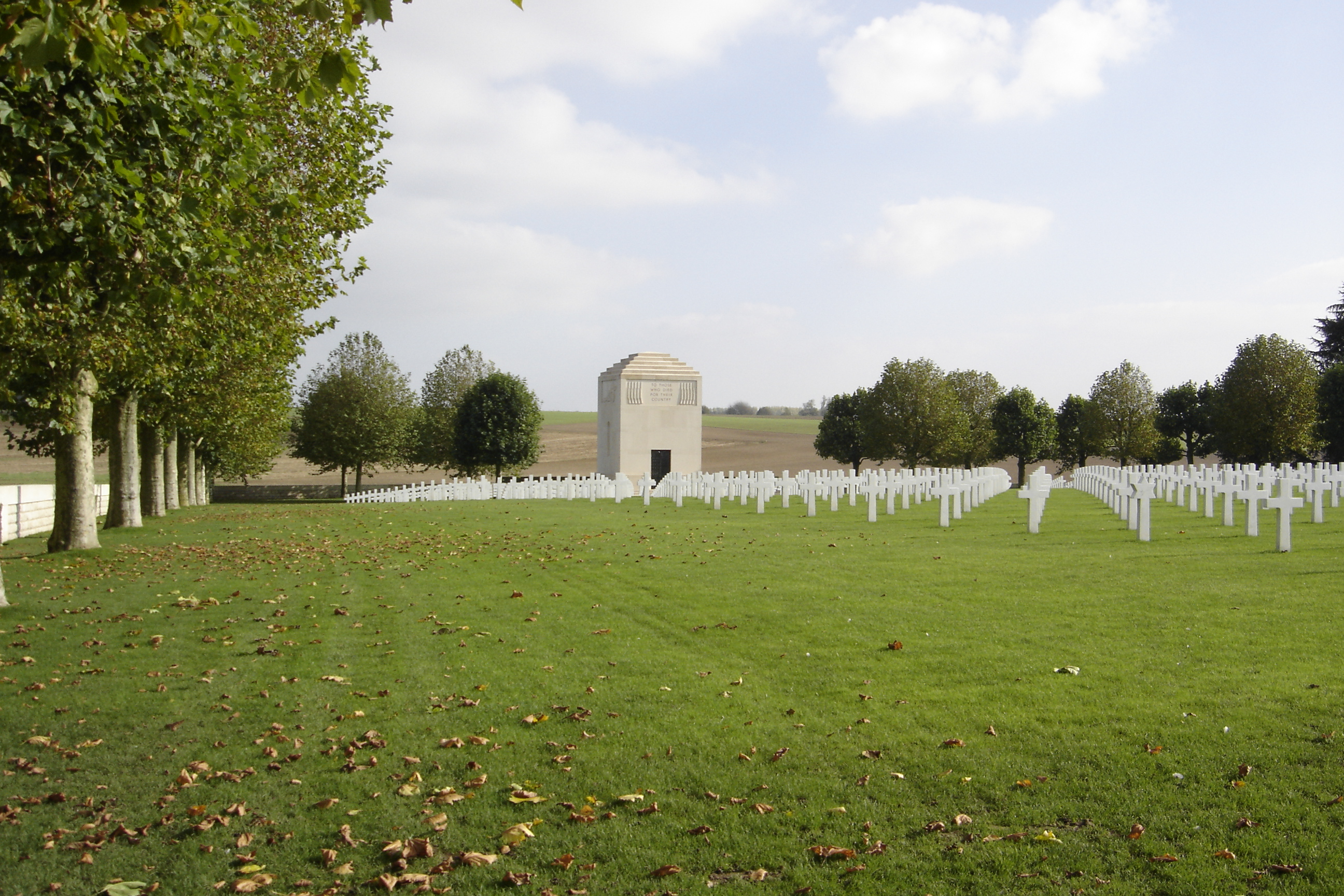
- Somme American Cemetery
- For United States military dead from World War I
- Location: 49°59′06″N 3°12′48″E
- Designed by: George Howe; Marcel Loyau

The Somme American Cemetery and Memorial in Picardie, France, is an American Battle Monuments Commission cemetery, situated ½ mile southwest of the commune of Bony, Aisne, in northern France. It is located on a gentle slope typical of the open, rolling Picardy countryside.

== Cemetery ==
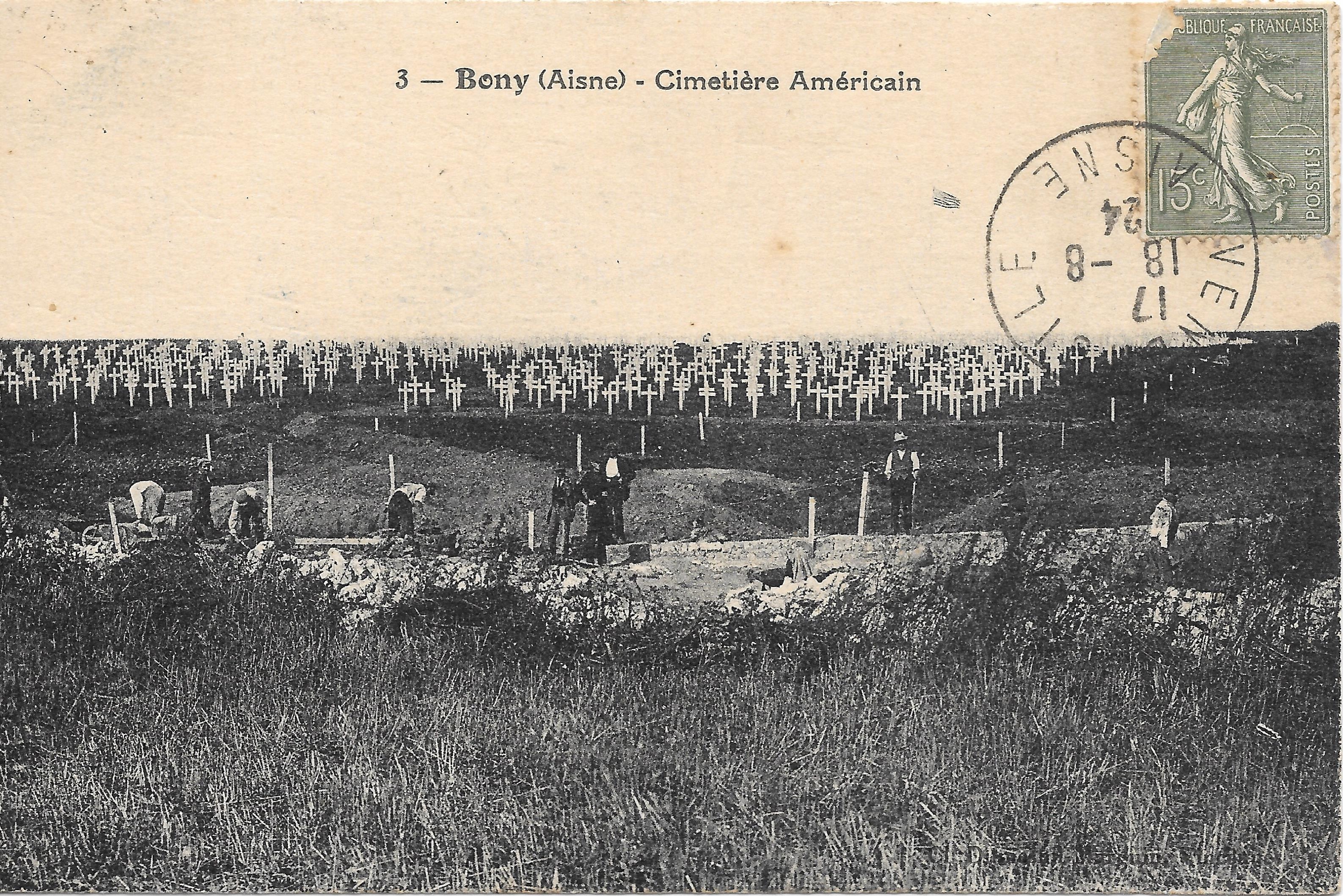
1920s postcard of Somme American Cemetery

The 14.3-acre (58,000 m^{2}) war cemetery was established in October 1918 on ground which saw heavy fighting just before and during the Battle of St Quentin Canal. It contains the graves of 1,844 of the United States' military dead from World War I. Most lost their lives in the assault on the Hindenburg Line while serving in American II Corps attached to the British Fourth Army. Others were killed in operations near Cantigny. The headstones, set in regular rows, are separated into four plots by paths that intersect at the flagpole near the top of the slope. The longer axis leads to the chapel at the eastern end of the cemetery.

A massive bronze door surmounted by an American eagle leads into the chapel, whose outer walls contain sculptured pieces of military equipment. Once inside, light from a cross-shaped crystal window above the marble altar bathes the subdued interior with light. The walls bear the names of 333 of the missing. Rosettes mark the names of those since recovered and identified.

== Notable burials ==
Grave of Dr. William T. Fitzsimons, the first U.S. officer killed in World War I

=== Medal of Honor recipients ===
- Robert Lester Blackwell (1895–1918 †), for action near St. Souplet, France
- Thomas E. O'Shea (1895–1918 †), for action at Le Catelet, France
- William Bradford Turner (1892–1918 †), for action at Ronssoy, France

=== Others ===
- William T. Fitzsimons (1889–1917), the first American officer killed in World War I
- Randolph Zane (1887–1918), awarded the Navy Cross, Distinguished Service Cross and Silver Star for actions in the Battle of Belleau Wood

== See also ==
- World War I memorials
