= Bony, Aisne =

Bony
- Commune
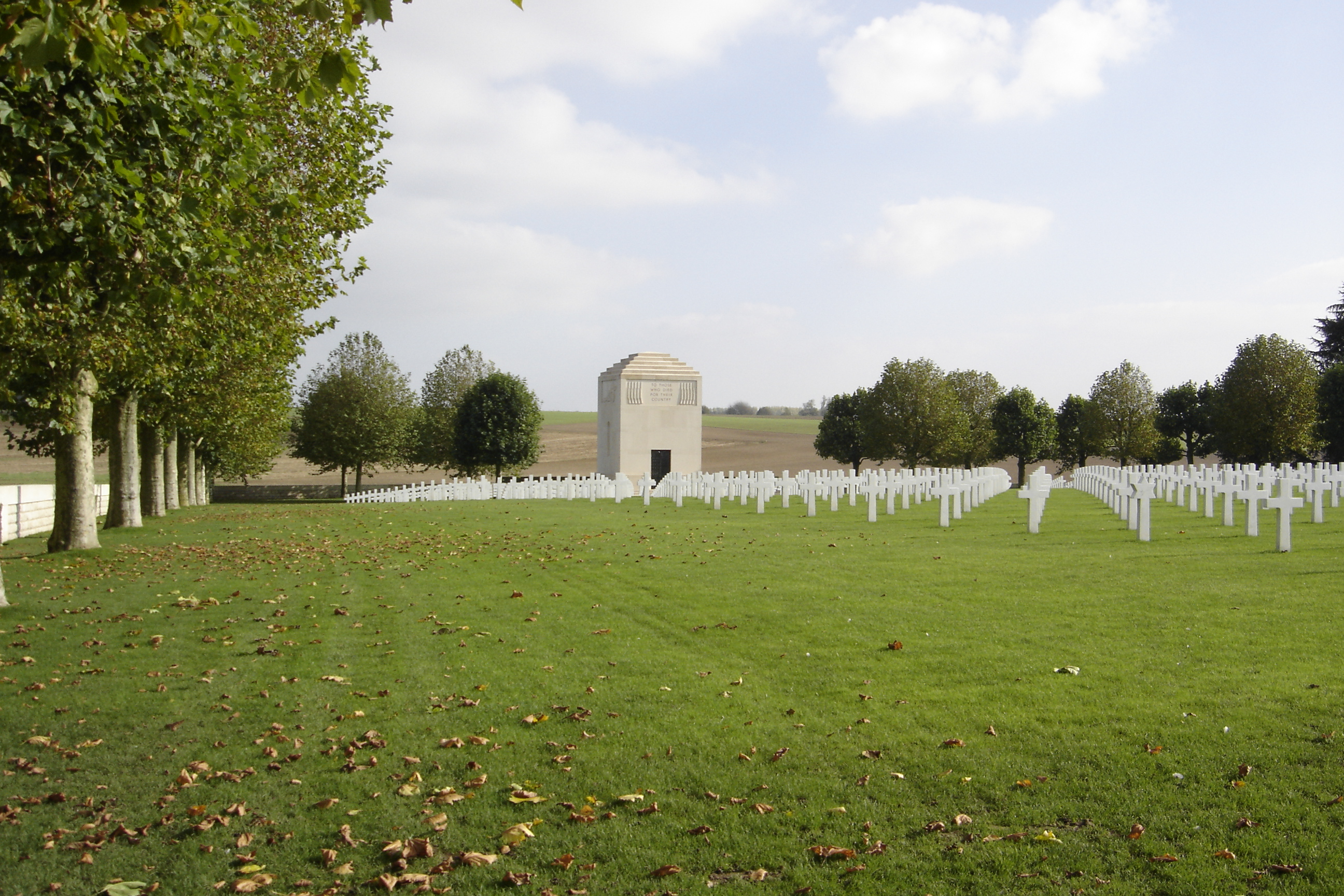
- The Somme American Cemetery and Memorial in Bony

- Coat of arms
- Location of Bony
- Location within France Location within Hauts-de-France
- Coordinates: 49°59′20″N 3°13′25″E
- Country: France
- Region: Hauts-de-France
- Department: Aisne
- Arrondissement: Saint-Quentin
- Canton: Bohain-en-Vermandois
- Intercommunality: Pays du Vermandois

Government
  - Mayor (2026–32): Philippe Gyselinck
- Area^{1}: 7.98 km^{2} (3.08 sq mi)
- Elevation: 115 m (377 ft)
- Highest elevation: 146 m (479 ft)
- Lowest elevation: 87 m (285 ft)
- Population (2023): 137
  - Density: 17.2/km^{2} (44.5/sq mi)
- Time zone: UTC+01:00 (CET)
  - Summer (DST): UTC+02:00 (CEST)
- INSEE/Postal code: 02100 /02420
- ^{1} French Land Register data, which excludes lakes, ponds, glaciers > 1 km^{2} (0.386 sq mi or 247 acres) and river estuaries.

Bony (French pronunciation: [bɔni]) is a commune in the department of Aisne in Hauts-de-France in northern France.

== Population ==
Historical population
Year	Pop.	±% p.a.
1968	110	—
1975	109	−0.13%
1982	125	+1.98%
1990	101	−2.63%
1999	124	+2.31%
2007	124	+0.00%
2012	138	+2.16%
2017	137	−0.15%
2023	137	+0.00%
Source: INSEE

== See also ==
- Somme American Cemetery and Memorial
- Communes of the Aisne department
