= 2014–15 Premier League of Belize =

Premier League of Belize
- Season: 2014–15
- Dates: 19 October 2014 – 17 May 2015
- Champions: Opening: Belmopan Bandits; Closing: Verdes FC
- Matches: 100
- Goals: 296 (2.96 per match)
- Top goalscorer: Opening: Harrison Roches (10); Closing: Jarret Davis (10)
- Biggest home win: Belmopan Bandits 7–0 San Ignacio United (18 November 2014); Belmopan Bandits 8–1 Paradise/Freedom Fighters (6 December 2014); Wagiya 17–0 San Ignacio United (1 March 2015)
- Biggest away win: Belize Defence Force 0–6 Verdes FC (29 April 2015)
- Highest scoring: Police United 6–4 Wagiya (29 November 2014)
- Longest winning run: Police United (6)
- Longest unbeaten run: Police United (15)
- Longest winless run: San Ignacio United (11)
- Longest losing run: FC Belize; San Ignacio United (5)

The 2014–15 Premier League of Belize (also known as The Belikin Cup) was the fourth season of the highest competitive football league in Belize, after it was founded in 2011. There were two seasons which were spread over two years, the opening (which was played towards the end of 2014) and the closing (which was played at the beginning of 2015).

== Teams ==
Team	City	Stadium
Belize Defence Force	Dangriga	Various (Note: Belize Defence Force played their home games at People's Stadium in Orange Walk Town in the opening season.)
Belmopan Bandits	Belmopan	Isidoro Beaton Stadium
FC Belize	Belize City	MCC Grounds (Note: FC Belize played their home games at People's Stadium in Orange Walk Town in the opening season.)
King Energy/Freedom Fighters (Note: The team was previously named Paradise/Freedom Fighters, but was rebranded for the closing season.)	Punta Gorda	Toledo Union Field
Placencia Texmar Assassins	Independence	Michael Ashcroft Stadium
Police United	Belmopan	Isidoro Beaton Stadium
San Ignacio United	San Ignacio	Norman Broaster Stadium
Verdes FC	San Ignacio	Norman Broaster Stadium
Wagiya	Dangriga	Carl Ramos Stadium

== Opening season ==
All 7 teams that participated in the 2013–14 Premier League of Belize continued to play in the opening season of 2014–15, as well as the returning Placencia Texmar Assassins and the newly reformed Wagiya from Dangriga.

There would be one league consisting of the 9 teams, who will play each other once, with the top 4 teams advancing to the end of season playoffs. The opening season commenced on 19 October 2014.

The Round 8 game between FC Belize and Police United scheduled for 6 December 2014 was forfeited by FC Belize, giving the 3–0 victory to Police United.

The Round 9 game between FC Belize and Belmopan Bandits scheduled for 13 December 2014 was forfeited by FC Belize, giving the 3–0 victory to Belmopan Bandits.

=== League table ===
Pos	Team	Pld	W	D	L	GF	GA	GD	Pts	Qualification
1	Police United (Q)	8	5	3	0	23	10	+13	18	Qualification to the Playoffs
2	Verdes FC (Q)	8	5	2	1	19	9	+10	17	Qualification to the Playoffs
3	Belmopan Bandits (Q)	8	5	1	2	23	6	+17	16	Qualification to the Playoffs
4	Belize Defence Force (Q)	8	4	3	1	10	4	+6	15	Qualification to the Playoffs
5	Placencia Texmar Assassins	8	4	2	2	13	6	+7	14	
6	Wagiya	8	2	2	4	16	24	−8	8	
7	Paradise/Freedom Fighters	8	2	0	6	10	24	−14	6	
8	San Ignacio United	8	1	1	6	8	29	−21	4	
9	FC Belize	8	1	0	7	3	13	−10	3	

Source: Soccerway
Rules for classification: 1) points; 2) goal difference; 3) number of goals scored.
(Q) Qualified for the phase indicated

=== Results ===
==== Round 1 ====
19 October 2014
15:30

Belize Defence Force	2 – 1	FC Belize
Vallan Symms 30' (pen.); Shane Flores 48'		Oliver Hendricks 65' (pen.)

People's Stadium, Orange Walk Town

19 October 2014
15:30

Paradise/Freedom Fighters	0 – 2	Wagiya
		Abraham Chavez 31'; Hector Gomez 40'

Toledo Union Field, Punta Gorda

19 October 2014
15:30

Verdes FC	4 – 2	San Ignacio United
Richard Jimenez 19'; Nahjib Guerra 45'; Jarret Davis 56', 87'		Joel Guzman 29'; Julian Maldonado 81'

Norman Broaster Stadium, San Ignacio

22 October 2014
19:30

Belmopan Bandits	0 – 1	Police United
		Lennox Castillo 71'

Isidoro Beaton Stadium, Belmopan

==== Round 2 ====
25 October 2014
19:30

Placencia Texmar Assassins	0 – 0	Police United

Michael Ashcroft Stadium, Independence

26 October 2014
15:30

Paradise/Freedom Fighters	0 – 2	Belize Defence Force
		Carlton Thomas 38'; Stephen Martinez 76'

Toledo Union Field, Punta Gorda

26 October 2014
15:30

Wagiya	1 – 1	Belmopan Bandits
Wendell Trapp 16'		Khalil Velasquez 32'

Carl Ramos Stadium, Dangriga

5 November 2014
19:30

FC Belize	0 – 1	Verdes FC
		Richard Jimenez 43'

People's Stadium, Orange Walk Town

==== Round 3 ====
1 November 2014
19:30

Placencia Texmar Assassins	3 – 0	Paradise/Freedom Fighters
Norman Nunez 4'; Luis Torres 75'; Kendis Hernandez 77'

Michael Ashcroft Stadium, Independence

1 November 2014
19:30

Police United	2 – 2	Verdes FC
Amin August Jr. 55'; Trevor Lennan 65'		Nahjib Guerra 12'; Gilroy Thurton 33'

Isidoro Beaton Stadium, Belmopan

2 November 2014
15:30

San Ignacio United	0 – 3	Belize Defence Force
		Shane Flores 52'; Carlton Thomas 69'; Jeremy Gentle 82'

Norman Broaster Stadium, San Ignacio

2 November 2014
15:30

Wagiya	0 – 1	FC Belize
		Oliver Hendricks 5'

Carl Ramos Stadium, Dangriga

==== Round 4 ====
8 November 2014
19:30

Belmopan Bandits	7 – 0	San Ignacio United
Highking Roberts 16', 50', 78'; Elroy Kuylen 44', 66'; John King 69'; Jordy Polanco 72'

Isidoro Beaton Stadium, Belmopan

8 November 2014
19:30

FC Belize	0 – 1	Placencia Texmar Assassins
		Luis Torres 85' (pen.)

People's Stadium, Orange Walk Town

9 November 2014
15:30

Belize Defence Force	0 – 0	Police United

People's Stadium, Orange Walk Town

9 November 2014
15:30

Verdes FC	2 – 0	Paradise/Freedom Fighters
Jarret Davis 62', 72'

Norman Broaster Stadium, San Ignacio

==== Round 5 ====
15 November 2014
19:30

Belmopan Bandits	3 – 2	Verdes FC
Elroy Kuylen 3'; Woodrow West 54' (pen.); Highking Roberts 79'		Jarret Davis 52'; Dalton Eiley 84' (o.g.)

Isidoro Beaton Stadium, Belmopan

16 November 2014
15:30

Belize Defence Force	0 – 1	Placencia Texmar Assassins
		Luis Torres 71'

People's Stadium, Orange Walk Town

16 November 2014
15:30

Paradise/Freedom Fighters	2 – 1	FC Belize
Eduardo Martinez 78'; George Albejo 88'		Mark Leslie 59'

Toledo Union Field, Punta Gorda

16 November 2014
15:30

San Ignacio United	2 – 4	Wagiya
Marion Nicasio 46' (o.g.); Cyril Simmons 53'		Wendell Trapp 2'; Byron Chavez 29'; Brandon Cacho 39'; Abraham Chavez 75'

Norman Broaster Stadium, San Ignacio

==== Round 6 ====
22 November 2014
19:30

Police United	5 – 3	Paradise/Freedom Fighters
Harrison Roches 28', 51'; Marlon Meza 59' (pen.); Kishane Pech 79'; Amin August Jr. 90+'		Kenroy Arthurs 19'; Wilmer Garcia 23' (pen.), 34'

Isidoro Beaton Stadium, Belmopan

22 November 2014
19:30

Placencia Texmar Assassins	0 – 1	Belmopan Bandits
		Elroy Kuylen 36'

Michael Ashcroft Stadium, Independence

23 November 2014
15:30

San Ignacio United	1 – 0	FC Belize
Cyril Simmons 73'

Norman Broaster Stadium, San Ignacio

23 November 2014
16:00

Wagiya	2 – 2	Belize Defence Force
Wendell Trapp 54'; Brandon Cacho 65'		Carlton Thomas 28'; Jesse Smith 87'

Carl Ramos Stadium, Dangriga

==== Round 7 ====
29 November 2014
19:30

Belize Defence Force	1 – 0	Belmopan Bandits
Carlton Thomas 10'

People's Stadium, Orange Walk Town

29 November 2014
19:30

Police United	6 – 4	Wagiya
Harrison Roches 27', 51', 53', 82'; Trevor Lennan 61'; Daniel Jimenez 90+'		Abraham Chavez 45+' (pen.), 48' (pen.), 66' (pen.); Brandon Cacho 74'

Isidoro Beaton Stadium, Belmopan

30 November 2014
15:30

Verdes FC	2 – 1	Placencia Texmar Assassins
Rodney Pacheco 57'; Jarret Davis 68'		Luis Torres 65' (pen.)

Norman Broaster Stadium, San Ignacio

30 November 2014
16:00

Paradise/Freedom Fighters	4 – 1	San Ignacio United
Jevon Aranda 8'; Alexander Peters 46', 63', 78'		Carlos Vasquez 40'

Toledo Union Field, Punta Gorda

==== Round 8 ====
6 December 2014
19:30

Belmopan Bandits	8 – 1	Paradise/Freedom Fighters
Adrian Gonzalez 4' (o.g.); Elroy Kuylen 12', 20'; Jordy Polanco 34'; Jeromy James 45+'; Highking Roberts 52', 54'; John King 83'		Wilmer Garcia 47'

Isidoro Beaton Stadium, Belmopan

6 December 2014
19:30

FC Belize	0 – 3	Police United

People's Stadium, Orange Walk Town

7 December 2014
15:30

San Ignacio United	1 – 1	Placencia Texmar Assassins
Torben Bhrens 14'		Gilbert Rivas 90+'

Norman Broaster Stadium, San Ignacio

7 December 2014
16:00

Wagiya	1 – 6	Verdes FC
Abraham Chavez 7'		Marlon Molina 51', 67', 85'; Cristobal Gilharry 52'; Jarret Davis 72' (pen.); San Mendez 83'

Carl Ramos Stadium, Dangriga

==== Round 9 ====
13 December 2014
19:30

FC Belize	0 – 3 (Awarded)	Belmopan Bandits

People's Stadium, Orange Walk Town

13 December 2014
19:30

Placencia Texmar Assassins	6 – 2	Wagiya
Ernie Whyte 5'; Kareem Haylock 22'; Ashley Torres 28', 73'; Luis Torres 69'; Dellon Torres 90'		Wendell Trapp 1'; Abraham Chavez 45'

Michael Ashcroft Stadium, Independence

13 December 2014
19:30

Police United	6 – 1	San Ignacio United
Harrison Roches 38' (pen.), 86'; Lennox Castillo 62', 67', 72'; Marlon Meza 90+'		Dudley Smith 17'

Isidoro Beaton Stadium, Belmopan

14 December 2014
16:00

Verdes FC	0 – 0	Belize Defence Force

Norman Broaster Stadium, San Ignacio

=== Opening season playoffs ===
The playoffs will consist of the top four ranked teams from the regular season: Police United, Verdes FC, Belmopan Bandits and Belize Defence Force. The teams will play each other twice. The top two teams will qualify for the finals.

=== Playoffs table ===
Pos	Team	Pld	W	D	L	GF	GA	GD	Pts	Qualification
1	Police United (Q)	6	4	0	2	7	7	0	12	Qualification to the Finals
2	Belmopan Bandits (Q)	6	3	1	2	4	3	+1	10	Qualification to the Finals
3	Verdes FC	6	2	2	2	6	3	+3	8	
4	Belize Defence Force	6	1	1	4	3	7	−4	4	

Source: Soccerway
Rules for classification: 1) points; 2) goal difference; 3) number of goals scored.
(Q) Qualified for the phase indicated

=== Playoff results ===
==== Round 1 ====
20 December 2014
19:30

Police United	2 – 1	Belmopan Bandits
Franz Vernon 29'; Marlon Meza 81'		Jeromy James 65'

Isidoro Beaton Stadium, Belmopan

21 December 2014
15:30

Verdes FC	1 – 1	Belize Defence Force
Jarret Davis 56'		Stephen Martinez 29'

Norman Broaster Stadium, San Ignacio

==== Round 2 ====
24 December 2014
15:30

Belize Defence Force	0 – 2	Police United
		Trevor Lennan 44'; Harrison Roches 90+'

People's Stadium, Orange Walk Town

24 December 2014
19:30

Belmopan Bandits	0 – 0	Verdes FC

Isidoro Beaton Stadium, Belmopan

==== Round 3 ====
27 December 2014
19:30

Belmopan Bandits	1 – 0	Belize Defence Force
Elroy Kuylen 45+'

Isidoro Beaton Stadium, Belmopan

28 December 2014
15:30

Police United	0 – 1	Verdes FC
		Gilroy Thurton 48'

Isidoro Beaton Stadium, Belmopan

==== Round 4 ====
31 December 2014
16:00

Belize Defence Force	0 – 1	Belmopan Bandits
		Evan Mariano 62'

People's Stadium, Orange Walk Town

31 December 2014
16:00

Verdes FC	4 – 0	Police United
Richard Jimenez 10'; Orlando Jimenez 30'; Nahjib Guerra 56'; Gilroy Thurton 74'

Norman Broaster Stadium, San Ignacio

==== Round 5 ====
3 January 2015
19:30

Police United	2 – 1	Belize Defence Force
Amin August Jr. 17'; Clifton West 85'		Shane Flores 83'

Isidoro Beaton Stadium, Belmopan

4 January 2015
15:30

Verdes FC	0 – 1	Belmopan Bandits
		Shane Armstrong 90+'

Norman Broaster Stadium, San Ignacio

==== Round 6 ====
7 January 2015
19:30

Belize Defence Force	1 – 0	Verdes FC
Osmar Duran 60'

People's Stadium, Orange Walk Town

7 January 2015
19:30

Belmopan Bandits	0 – 1	Police United
		Harrison Roches 69'

Isidoro Beaton Stadium, Belmopan

=== Championship final series ===
==== Game one ====
14 January 2015
19:30

Belmopan Bandits	0 – 0	Police United

Isidoro Beaton Stadium, Belmopan
1. Game originally scheduled for 10 January 2015, but was postponed due to inclement weather.

==== Game two ====
17 January 2015
19:30

Police United	0 – 4	Belmopan Bandits
		Woodrow West 23' (pen.); Elroy Kuylen 67'; Jordy Polanco 73'; Denmark Casey Jr. 81'

Isidoro Beaton Stadium, Belmopan

2014–15 Opening season champions

4th title

=== Season statistics ===
==== Top scorers ====
Rank	Player	Team	Goals
1	(Belize) Harrison Roches	Police United	10
2	(Belize) Jarret Davis	Verdes FC	8
2	(Belize) Elroy Kuylen	Belmopan Bandits	8
4	(Belize) Abraham Chavez	Wagiya	7
5	(Belize) Highking Roberts	Belmopan Bandits	6
6	(Belize) Luis Torres	Placencia Texmar Assassins	5
7	(Belize) Lennox Castillo	Police United	4
7	(Belize) Carlton Thomas	Belize Defence Force	4
7	(Belize) Wendell Trapp	Wagiya	4

(*) Please note playoff goals are included.

==== Hat tricks ====
Player	For	Against	Result	Date
(Belize) Highking Roberts	Belmopan Bandits	San Ignacio United	7–0 (H)	8 November 2014
(Belize) Harrison Roches^{4}	Police United	Wagiya	6–4 (H)	29 November 2014
(Belize) Abraham Chavez	Wagiya	Police United	4–6 (A)	29 November 2014
(Belize) Alexander Peters	Paradise/Freedom Fighters	San Ignacio United	4–1 (H)	30 November 2014
(Belize) Marlon Molina	Verdes FC	Wagiya	6–1 (A)	7 December 2014
(Belize) Lennox Castillo	Police United	San Ignacio United	6–1 (H)	13 December 2014

- ^{4} Player scored 4 goals

=== Awards ===
In the post-game ceremonies of the final game of the season, the individual awards were announced for the regular season.

Award	Recipient	Team
Most Goals	(Belize) Harrison Roches	Police United
MVP	(Belize) Rodney Pacheco	Verdes FC
Best Midfielder	(Belize) Jordy Polanco	Belmopan Bandits
Best Defender	(Belize) Dalton Eiley	Belmopan Bandits
Best Goalkeeper	(Belize) Tevin Gamboa	Belize Defence Force

== Closing season ==
All 9 teams that participated in the opening season will participate in the closing season, with Paradise/Freedom Fighters being rebranded as King Energy/Freedom Fighters.

The format will be the same as the opening season with one league consisting of the 9 teams, who will play each other once, with the top 4 teams advancing to the end of season playoffs. The closing season will commence on 31 January 2015.

=== League table ===
Pos	Team	Pld	W	D	L	GF	GA	GD	Pts	Qualification
1	Police United (Q)	8	4	4	0	19	6	+13	16	Qualification to the Playoffs
2	Verdes FC (Q)	8	5	1	2	14	6	+8	16	Qualification to the Playoffs
3	Belmopan Bandits (Q)	8	4	3	1	9	2	+7	15	Qualification to the Playoffs
4	Belize Defence Force (Q)	8	4	2	2	13	7	+6	14	Qualification to the Playoffs
5	King Energy/Freedom Fighters	8	2	4	2	12	8	+4	10	
6	Placencia Texmar Assassins	8	2	4	2	15	15	0	10	
7	Wagiya	8	3	1	4	14	16	−2	10	
8	FC Belize	8	1	2	5	8	19	−11	5	
9	San Ignacio United	8	0	1	7	5	30	−25	1	

Source: Soccerway
Rules for classification: 1) points; 2) goal difference; 3) number of goals scored.
(Q) Qualified for the phase indicated

=== Results ===
==== Round 1 ====
31 January 2015
19:30

Police United	0 – 0	Belmopan Bandits

Isidoro Beaton Stadium, Belmopan

1 February 2015
15:30

FC Belize	2 – 2	Belize Defence Force
Carlos Lino 10'; Albert Thurton 47' (pen.)		Leon Jones 22'; Shane Flores 26'

MCC Grounds, Belize City

1 February 2015
15:30

San Ignacio United	1 – 2	Verdes FC
Garret Bermudez 34'		Ryan Gill 7'; Julian Maldonado 90' (o.g.)

Norman Broaster Stadium, San Ignacio

1 February 2015
15:30

Wagiya	0 – 0	King Energy/Freedom Fighters

Carl Ramos Stadium, Dangriga

==== Round 2 ====
7 February 2015
19:30

Police United	3 – 3	Placencia Texmar Assassins
Harrison Roches 15'; Byron Usher 49'; Clifton West 73'		Luis Torres 12' (pen.); Ashley Torres 63'; Norman Nunez 87'

Isidoro Beaton Stadium, Belmopan

8 February 2015
15:30

Belize Defence Force	3 – 1	King Energy/Freedom Fighters
Osmar Duran 19'; Carlton Thomas 39'; James Flores 62'		Darroll Lambey 90+'

Carl Ramos Stadium, Dangriga

8 February 2015
15:30

Belmopan Bandits	3 – 0	Wagiya
Jehoshaphat Nnadi 51'; Highking Roberts 90+', 90+'

Isidoro Beaton Stadium, Belmopan

8 February 2015
15:30

Verdes FC	3 – 0	FC Belize
Alcides Thomas 1'; Richard Jimenez 7'; Jarret Davis 86'

Norman Broaster Stadium, San Ignacio

==== Round 3 ====
15 February 2015
15:30

Belize Defence Force	5 – 0	San Ignacio United
Ricky Ricketts 14'; James Flores 15'; Gilbert Carrillo 40' (o.g.); Andrew Allen 57'; Adgar Adderley 67'

Isidoro Beaton Stadium, Belmopan

15 February 2015
15:30

FC Belize	2 – 3	Wagiya
Ernest Flores 75'; Luis Arriola 83'		Byron Chavez 26'; Shantylee Castillo 67'; Devin Burgess 80' (pen.)

MCC Grounds, Belize City

15 February 2015
15:30

Verdes FC	1 – 2	Police United
Delroy Andrews 79'		Harrison Roches 43'; Daniel Jimenez 50'

Norman Broaster Stadium, San Ignacio

18 February 2015
19:30

King Energy/Freedom Fighters	2 – 2	Placencia Texmar Assassins
Jevon Aranda; Darroll Lambey		Ashley Torres; Luis Torres

Toledo Union Field, Punta Gorda

1. Game originally scheduled for 15 February 2015, but was postponed due to inclement weather.

==== Round 4 ====
21 February 2015
19:30

Placencia Texmar Assassins	1 – 1	FC Belize
Luis Torres 9'		Calvin Reneau 77'

Michael Ashcroft Stadium, Independence

21 February 2015
19:30

Police United	0 – 0	Belize Defence Force

Isidoro Beaton Stadium, Belmopan

22 February 2015
15:30

King Energy/Freedom Fighters	1 – 2	Verdes FC
Wilmer Garcia 6'		Jarret Davis 48' (pen.), 71'

Toledo Union Field, Punta Gorda

22 February 2015
15:30

San Ignacio United	0 – 0	Belmopan Bandits

Norman Broaster Stadium, San Ignacio

==== Round 5 ====
28 February 2015
19:30

Placencia Texmar Assassins	1 – 2	Belize Defence Force
Luis Torres 29'		Carlton Thomas 4'; Leon Jones 69'

Michael Ashcroft Stadium, Independence

1 March 2015
15:30

FC Belize	0 – 4	King Energy/Freedom Fighters
		Darroll Lambey 61'; Dwayne Sampson 65', 68'; Jevon Aranda 87'

MCC Grounds, Belize City

1 March 2015
15:30

Verdes FC	0 – 1	Belmopan Bandits
		Jeromy James 28'

Norman Broaster Stadium, San Ignacio

1 March 2015
15:30

Wagiya	7 – 0	San Ignacio United
Dion Moguel 6', 53'; Byron Chavez 38'; Eugene Martinez 55'; Brandon Cacho 67'; Lennox Mejia 85'; Leonard Valdez 86'

Carl Ramos Stadium, Dangriga

==== Round 6 ====
7 March 2015
19:30

Belmopan Bandits	1 – 2	Placencia Texmar Assassins
Jordy Polanco 63'		Dellon Torres 6'; Luis Torres 54'

Isidoro Beaton Stadium, Belmopan

8 March 2015
16:00

Belize Defence Force	1 – 0	Wagiya
Stephen Martinez 34'

Carl Ramos Stadium, Dangriga

8 March 2015
16:00

FC Belize	3 – 0	San Ignacio United
Devaun Zuniga 5'; Jahron Myvett 63' (pen.); Carlos Lino 84'

MCC Grounds, Belize City

8 March 2015
16:00

King Energy/Freedom Fighters	0 – 0	Police United

Toledo Union Field, Punta Gorda

==== Round 7 ====
14 March 2015
19:30

Belmopan Bandits	1 – 0	Belize Defence Force
Jeromy James 71'

Isidoro Beaton Stadium, Belmopan

14 March 2015
19:30

Placencia Texmar Assassins	1 – 1	Verdes FC
Ashley Torres		Jarret Davis

Michael Ashcroft Stadium, Independence

15 March 2015
15:30

San Ignacio United	1 – 4	King Energy/Freedom Fighters
Cyril Simmons 50'		George Morales 39'; Darroll Lambey 42', 90+'; Kenroy Arthurs 83'

Norman Broaster Stadium, San Ignacio

15 March 2015
16:00

Wagiya	1 – 5	Police United
Brandon Cacho 31'		Harrison Roches 14'; Clifton West 69', 72', 79'; Andres Makin Jr. 90'

Carl Ramos Stadium, Dangriga

==== Round 8 ====
8 April 2015
20:00

King Energy/Freedom Fighters	0 – 0	Belmopan Bandits

Toledo Union Field, Punta Gorda

8 April 2015
20:00

Placencia Texmar Assassins	3 – 2	San Ignacio United

Michael Ashcroft Stadium, Independence

8 April 2015
20:00

Police United	3 – 0 (Awarded)	FC Belize

Isidoro Beaton Stadium, Belmopan

8 April 2015
20:00

Verdes FC	3 – 0	Wagiya
Alcides Thomas (pen.); Everal Trapp; Jarret Davis

Norman Broaster Stadium, San Ignacio
1. All round 8 games were originally scheduled for the weekend of 21–22 March, but were postponed by two weeks due to the Belize national football team's participation in the qualification for the 2018 FIFA World Cup.
2. The Police United-FC Belize match was not played as FC Belize was unable to field a team. Police United was awarded the victory.

==== Round 9 ====
11 April 2015
19:30

Belmopan Bandits	3 – 0 (Awarded)	FC Belize

Isidoro Beaton Stadium, Belmopan

12 April 2015
15:30

Wagiya	3 – 2	Placencia Texmar Assassins
Brandon Cacho 60'; Brent Whyte 76'; Hassan Lucas 85'		Luis Torres 24'; Dellon Torres 35'

Carl Ramos Stadium, Dangriga

12 April 2015
16:00

Belize Defence Force	0 – 2	Verdes FC
		Orlando Jimenez 74'; Alcides Thomas 88'

MCC Grounds, Belize City

12 April 2015
16:00

San Ignacio United	1 – 6	Police United
Giovanni Cho 64'		Marlon Meza 23', 90+3'; Harrison Roches 30', 50', 56'; Clifton West 68'

Norman Broaster Stadium, San Ignacio
1. All round 9 games were originally scheduled for the weekend of 4–5 April, but were postponed by one week due to the re-scheduling of round 8.
2. FC Belize were disqualified for the remainder of the season and for a further two after failing to field a team 3 times in one season.

=== Closing season playoffs ===
The playoffs will consist of the top four ranked teams from the regular season: Police United, Verdes FC, Belmopan Bandits and Belize Defence Force. The teams will play each other twice. The top two teams will qualify for the finals.

=== Playoffs table ===
Pos	Team	Pld	W	D	L	GF	GA	GD	Pts	Qualification
1	Verdes FC (Q)	6	3	2	1	14	4	+10	11	Qualification to the Finals
2	Belmopan Bandits (Q)	6	3	1	2	9	7	+2	10	Qualification to the Finals
3	Police United	6	1	4	1	5	6	−1	7	
4	Belize Defence Force	6	1	1	4	7	18	−11	4	

Source: Soccerway
Rules for classification: 1) points; 2) goal difference; 3) number of goals scored.
(Q) Qualified for the phase indicated

=== Playoff results ===
==== Round 1 ====
15 April 2015
19:30

Belize Defence Force	2 – 2	Police United
Osmar Duran 16'; Vallan Symms 75'		Harrison Roches 45+3'; Marlon Meza 77' (pen.)

Norman Broaster Stadium, San Ignacio

15 April 2015
19:30

Belmopan Bandits	1 – 2	Verdes FC
Elroy Kuylen 51'		Richard Jimenez 28'; Jarret Davis 62'

FFB Stadium, Belmopan

==== Round 2 ====
18 April 2015
19:30

Belmopan Bandits	1 – 0	Belize Defence Force
Jeromy James 88'

FFB Stadium, Belmopan

19 April 2015
15:30

Police United	0 – 0	Verdes FC

Norman Broaster Stadium, San Ignacio

==== Round 3 ====
23 April 2015
19:00

Belize Defence Force	3 – 2	Belmopan Bandits
Shane Flores; Osmar Duran		Denmark Casey Jr. Elroy Kuylen (x1)

Norman Broaster Stadium, San Ignacio

23 April 2015
21:30

Verdes FC	0 – 0	Police United

Norman Broaster Stadium, San Ignacio

==== Round 4 ====
26 April 2015
15:30

Police United	2 – 1	Belize Defence Force
Harrison Roches 28'; Devon Makin 58'		Harrison Tasher 21'

FFB Stadium, Belmopan

26 April 2015
15:30

Verdes FC	1 – 2	Belmopan Bandits
Alcides Thomas 72'		Randy Padilla 34', 48'

Norman Broaster Stadium, San Ignacio

==== Round 5 ====
29 April 2015
19:30

Belize Defence Force	0 – 6	Verdes FC
		Jarret Davis 25', 41', 49'; San Mendez 55'; Jesus Patino 67'; Marlon Molina 84'

Norman Broaster Stadium, San Ignacio

29 April 2015
19:30

Belmopan Bandits	1 – 1	Police United
Elroy Kuylen 88'		Daniel Jimenez 5'

FFB Stadium, Belmopan

==== Round 6 ====
2 May 2015
19:00

Police United	0 – 2	Belmopan Bandits
		Randy Padilla 55'; Jehoshaphat Nnadi 86'

Norman Broaster Stadium, San Ignacio

3 May 2015
16:00

Verdes FC	5 – 1	Belize Defence Force
Rodney Pacheco 45+' (pen.); Orlando Jimenez 63'; Jamil Cano 68'; Marlon Molina 71', 80'		Adgar Adderley 90'

Norman Broaster Stadium, San Ignacio

=== Championship final series ===
==== Game one ====
7 May 2015
19:30

Belmopan Bandits	1 – 0	Verdes FC
Edmund Pandy Jr. 86'

FFB Stadium, Belmopan

==== Game two ====
17 May 2015
16:00

Verdes FC	2 – 0	Belmopan Bandits
Alcides Thomas 31'; Jarret Davis 90+'

Norman Broaster Stadium, San Ignacio
Referee: Christopher Reid

2014–15 Closing season champions

1st title

=== Season statistics ===
==== Top scorers ====
Rank	Player	Team	Goals
1	(Belize) Jarret Davis	Verdes FC	10
2	(Belize) Harrison Roches	Police United	8
3	(Belize) Luis Torres	Placencia Texmar Assassins	6
4	(Belize) Darroll Lambey	King Energy/Freedom Fighters	5
4	(Brazil) Alcides Thomas	Verdes FC	5
4	(Belize) Clifton West	Police United	5
7	(Belize) Brandon Cacho	Wagiya	3
7	(Belize) Osmar Duran	Belize Defence Force	3
7	(Belize) Shane Flores	Belize Defence Force	3
7	(Belize) Jeromy James	Belmopan Bandits	3
7	(Belize) Elroy Kuylen	Belmopan Bandits	3
7	(Belize) Marlon Meza	Police United	3
7	(Honduras) Marlon Molina	Verdes FC	3
7	(Belize) Randy Padilla	Belmopan Bandits	3
7	(Belize) Ashley Torres	Placencia Texmar Assassins	3

(*) Please note playoff goals are included.

==== Hat tricks ====
Player	For	Against	Result	Date
(Belize) Clifton West	Police United	Wagiya	5–1 (A)	15 March 2015
(Belize) Harrison Roches	Police United	San Ignacio United	6–1 (A)	12 April 2015
(Belize) Jarret Davis	Verdes FC	Belize Defence Force	6–0 (A)	29 April 2015

=== Awards ===
In the post-game ceremonies of the final game of the season, the individual awards were announced for the regular season.

Award	Recipient	Team
Most Goals (Regular Season)	(Belize) Harrison Roches	Police United
Most Goals (Overall)	(Belize) Jarret Davis	Verdes FC
MVP (Regular Season)	(Belize) Rodney Pacheco	Verdes FC
MVP (Playoff)	(Belize) Jarret Davis	Verdes FC
Best Forward	(Belize) Harrison Roches	Police United
Best Midfielder	(Belize) Jordy Polanco	Belmopan Bandits
Best Defender	(Belize) Dalton Eiley	Belmopan Bandits
Best Goalkeeper	(Belize) Woodrow West	Belmopan Bandits

== Aggregate table ==
The champion with the best aggregate record qualifies for the 2015–16 CONCACAF Champions League.

Pos	Team	Pld	W	D	L	GF	GA	GD	Pts	Qualification
1	Police United	16	9	7	0	42	16	+26	34	
2	Verdes FC	16	10	3	3	33	15	+18	33	Closing Season champions Qualification to 2015–16 CONCACAF Champions League
3	Belmopan Bandits	16	9	4	3	32	8	+24	31	Opening Season champions
4	Belize Defence Force	16	8	5	3	23	11	+12	29	
5	Placencia Texmar Assassins	16	6	6	4	28	21	+7	24	
6	Wagiya	16	5	3	8	30	40	−10	18	
7	King Energy/Freedom Fighters	16	4	4	8	22	32	−10	16	
8	FC Belize	16	2	2	12	11	32	−21	8	
9	San Ignacio United	16	1	2	13	13	59	−46	5	

Source: Soccerway
Rules for classification: 1) points; 2) goal difference; 3) number of goals scored.
