= 2013–14 Premier League (disambiguation) =

2013–14 Premier League may refer to a number of professional sports league seasons:

Association football

- 2013–14 Armenian Premier League
- 2013–14 Azerbaijan Premier League
- 2013–14 Premier League of Belize
- 2013–14 Premier League of Bosnia and Herzegovina
- 2013–14 Egyptian Premier League
- 2013–14 Premier League (England)
- 2013–14 Israeli Premier League
- 2013–14 Kuwaiti Premier League
- 2013–14 Lebanese Premier League
- 2013–14 Maltese Premier League
- 2013–14 National Premier League (Jamaica)
- 2013–14 Premier Soccer League (South Africa)
- 2013–14 Russian Premier League
- 2013–14 Syrian Premier League
- 2013–14 Ukrainian Premier League
- 2013–14 Welsh Premier League

Basketball

- 2013–14 Irish Premier League season
