= 2014–15 Premier League (disambiguation) =

The 2014–15 Premier League was a professional association football league season in England.

2014–15 Premier League may also refer to:

== Association football ==
- 2014–15 Armenian Premier League
- 2014–15 Azerbaijan Premier League
- 2014–15 Premier League of Belize
- 2014–15 Premier League of Bosnia and Herzegovina
- 2014–15 Egyptian Premier League
- 2014–15 Hong Kong Premier League
- 2014–15 Israeli Premier League
- 2014–15 Kuwaiti Premier League
- 2014–15 Lebanese Premier League
- 2014–15 Maltese Premier League
- 2014–15 National Premier League (Jamaica)
- 2014–15 Premier Soccer League (South Africa)
- 2014–15 Russian Premier League
- 2014–15 Syrian Premier League
- 2014–15 Tanzanian Premier League
- 2014–15 Ukrainian Premier League
- 2014–15 Welsh Premier League

== Basketball ==
- 2014–15 Irish Premier League season
