= 2013–14 Premier League of Belize =

Premier League of Belize
- Season: 2013–14
- Dates: 28 September 2013 – 17 May 2014
- Champions: Opening: Belmopan Bandits; Closing: Belmopan Bandits
- Matches: 96
- Goals: 231 (2.41 per match)
- Top goalscorer: Opening: Deon McCaulay (13); Closing: Clifton West (7)
- Biggest home win: Belmopan Bandits 5-1 FC Belize (8 February 2014)
- Biggest away win: Police United 1-3 Belize Defence Force (28 September 2013); San Ignacio United 2-4 FC Belize (15 December 2013)
- Highest scoring: Paradise/Freedom Fighters 3-4 San Ignacio United (19 April 2014)
- Longest winning run: Police United (4)
- Longest unbeaten run: Belmopan Bandits (15)
- Longest winless run: San Ignacio United (12)
- Longest losing run: Paradise/Freedom Fighters; San Ignacio United (4)

The 2013–14 Premier League of Belize (also known as The Belikin Cup) was the third season of the highest competitive football league in Belize, after it was founded in 2011. There were two seasons which are spread over two years, the opening (which was played towards the end of 2013) and the closing (which was played at the beginning of 2014).

== Teams ==
Team	City	Stadium
Belize Defence Force	Dangriga	Carl Ramos Stadium
Belmopan Bandits	Belmopan	Isidoro Beaton Stadium
FC Belize	Belize City	MCC Grounds
Paradise/Freedom Fighters	Punta Gorda	Toledo Union Field
Police United	Belmopan	Isidoro Beaton Stadium
San Ignacio United	San Ignacio	Norman Broaster Stadium
Verdes FC	Benque Viejo del Carmen	Marshalleck Stadium

== Opening season ==
Only 6 of the 8 teams competing in the 2012–13 Premier League of Belize closing season continued to play in the opening season of 2013–14. Placencia Assassins and San Felipe Barcelona dropped out, whilst Paradise/Freedom Fighters re-entered the league, making 7 teams.

There would be one league consisting of the 7 teams, who will play each other twice, with the top 4 teams advancing to the end of season playoffs. The opening season commenced on 28 September 2013.

All 3 of the Round 5 games were postponed due to excessive rain, and were rescheduled for a later date.

Also all 3 of the Round 7 games were postponed due to the rain, and were rescheduled for a later date.

=== League table ===
Pos	Team	Pld	W	D	L	GF	GA	GD	Pts	Qualification
1	Verdes FC	12	5	5	2	17	10	+7	20	Qualification to the Playoffs
2	Belize Defence Force	12	4	5	3	17	13	+4	17	Qualification to the Playoffs
3	Belmopan Bandits	12	4	5	3	13	12	+1	17	Qualification to the Playoffs
4	FC Belize	12	4	4	4	14	19	−5	16	Qualification to the Playoffs
5	Police United	12	3	6	3	14	12	+2	15	
6	Paradise/Freedom Fighters	12	3	6	3	14	12	+2	15	
7	San Ignacio United	12	2	3	7	14	25	−11	9	

Source: Soccerway
Rules for classification: 1) points; 2) goal difference; 3) number of goals scored.

=== Results ===
==== Round 1 ====
28 September 2013
19:30

Police United	1 – 3	Belize Defence Force
Clifton West 83'		John King 14'; Stephen Martinez 44'; Leonard Valdez 90+'

Isidoro Beaton Stadium, Belmopan

29 September 2013
15:30

San Ignacio United	2 – 2	Paradise/Freedom Fighters
Leary Simon 66'; Roy Cano 89'		Franz Vernon 4', 55'

Norman Broaster Stadium, San Ignacio

29 September 2013
16:00

FC Belize	0 – 0	Belmopan Bandits

MCC Grounds, Belize City

==== Round 2 ====
5 October 2013
19:30

Belmopan Bandits	4 – 1	San Ignacio United
Elroy Kuylen 11', 29', 88'; Deon McCaulay 51'		Anthony Gonzalez 57'

Isidoro Beaton Stadium, Belmopan

5 October 2013
19:30

Belize Defence Force	2 – 1	Verdes FC
Ambrose Thomas 17'; Vallan Symms 33' (pen.)		Orlando Jimenez 53'

Carl Ramos Stadium, Dangriga

6 October 2013
15:30

Paradise/Freedom Fighters	3 – 0	FC Belize
Franz Vernon 3', 62'; Lisbey Castillo 49'

Toledo Union Field, Punta Gorda

==== Round 3 ====
12 October 2013
19:30

Police United	1 – 1	Verdes FC
Bernard Linarez 19'		Jamil Cano 75'

Isidoro Beaton Stadium, Belmopan

13 October 2013
15:30

Paradise/Freedom Fighters	2 – 0	Belmopan Bandits
Lisbey Castillo 49' (pen.); Frank Lopez 79'

Toledo Union Field, Punta Gorda

13 October 2013
16:00

FC Belize	1 – 0	San Ignacio United
Jason Young 90+'

MCC Grounds, Belize City

==== Round 4 ====
19 October 2013
19:30

Belize Defence Force	2 – 0	FC Belize
Stephen Martinez 8'; Tarrel Flores 90+'

Carl Ramos Stadium, Dangriga

19 October 2013
19:30

Belmopan Bandits	1 – 0	Police United
Deon McCaulay 45'

Isidoro Beaton Stadium, Belmopan

19 October 2013
19:30

Verdes FC	1 – 0	Paradise/Freedom Fighters
Nahjib Guerra 33'

Marshalleck Stadium, Benque Viejo del Carmen

==== Round 5 ====
1 December 2013
15:30

Paradise/Freedom Fighters	1 – 1	Police United
Alexander Peters 85'		Bernard Linarez 86'

Toledo Union Field, Punta Gorda

1 December 2013
15:30

San Ignacio United	1 – 1	Belize Defence Force
Carlos Vasquez 29'		Khalil Velasquez 89'

Norman Broaster Stadium, San Ignacio

1 December 2013
16:00

FC Belize	1 – 1	Verdes FC
Devaun Zuniga 15'		Norman Nunez 8'

MCC Grounds, Belize City

==== Round 6 ====
2 November 2013
19:30

Belize Defence Force	1 – 2	Belmopan Bandits
Vallan Symms 22'		Denmark Casey Jr. 47'; Jeromy James 76'

Carl Ramos Stadium, Dangriga

2 November 2013
19:30

Police United	1 – 1	FC Belize
Harrison Roches 58'		Jarret Davis 15'

Isidoro Beaton Stadium, Belmopan

2 November 2013
19:30

Verdes FC	2 – 0	San Ignacio United
Norman Nunez 10'; Gilroy Thurton 62'

Marshalleck Stadium, Benque Viejo del Carmen

==== Round 7 ====
7 December 2013
19:30

Belmopan Bandits	2 – 1	Verdes FC
Deon McCaulay 29'; Denmark Casey Jr. 64'		Rodney Pacheco 10'

Isidoro Beaton Stadium, Belmopan

8 December 2013
15:30

Paradise/Freedom Fighters	2 – 2	Belize Defence Force
Ashley Torres 39'; Eduardo Martinez 41'		Khalil Velasquez 53', 56'

Toledo Union Field, Punta Gorda

8 December 2013
15:30

San Ignacio United	2 – 1	Police United
Joel Guzman 7', 63'		Harrison Roches 46'

Norman Broaster Stadium, San Ignacio

==== Round 8 ====
16 November 2013
19:30

Belmopan Bandits	2 – 3	FC Belize
Deon McCaulay 24', 78'		Floyd Jones O.G 4'; Jarret Davis 17', 50' (pen.)

Isidoro Beaton Stadium, Belmopan

17 November 2013
15:30

Paradise/Freedom Fighters	1 – 0	San Ignacio United
Franz Vernon 75'

Toledo Union Field, Punta Gorda

18 November 2013
19:30

Belize Defence Force	0 – 0	Police United

Carl Ramos Stadium, Dangriga

==== Round 9 ====
23 November 2013
19:30

Verdes FC	2 – 0	Belize Defence Force
Orlando Jimenez 5'; Julio Ayala 22'

Marshalleck Stadium, Benque Viejo del Carmen

24 November 2013
15:30

San Ignacio United	2 – 0	Belmopan Bandits
Anthony Gonzalez 17'; Carlos Vasquez 46'

Norman Broaster Stadium, San Ignacio

24 November 2013
16:00

FC Belize	1 – 1	Paradise/Freedom Fighters
Mark Leslie 45+'		Franz Vernon 75'

MCC Grounds, Belize City

==== Round 10 ====
14 December 2013
19:30

Belmopan Bandits	1 – 1	Paradise/Freedom Fighters
Elroy Kuylen 55'		Yusef Vernon 68'

Isidoro Beaton Stadium, Belmopan

15 December 2013
15:30

San Ignacio United	2 – 4	FC Belize
Anthony Gonzalez 47'; Shannon Flowers O.G 62'		Devaun Zuniga 37'; Jarret Davis 42', 87'; Kevin Lino 55'

Norman Broaster Stadium, San Ignacio

10 January 2014
19:30

Verdes FC	1 – 1	Police United
Richard Jimenez 33'		Clifton West 53'

Marshalleck Stadium, Benque Viejo del Carmen

==== Round 11 ====
21 December 2013
19:30

Police United	1 – 1	Belmopan Bandits
Clifton West 72'		David Trapp 64'

Isidoro Beaton Stadium, Belmopan

22 December 2013
15:30

Paradise/Freedom Fighters	0 – 1	Verdes FC
		Marlon Meza 58'

Toledo Union Field, Punta Gorda

22 December 2013
16:00

FC Belize	2 – 1	Belize Defence Force
Jarret Davis 60', 76'		John King 49'

MCC Grounds, Belize City

==== Round 12 ====
28 December 2013
19:30

Belize Defence Force	4 – 1	San Ignacio United
Abraham Chavez 6'; Khalil Velasquez 48'; Vallan Symms (?); Tarrel Flores 79'		Anthony Gonzalez 32'

Carl Ramos Stadium, Dangriga

28 December 2013
19:30

Police United	2 – 0	Paradise/Freedom Fighters
Harrison Roches 26'; Daniel Jimenez 53'

Isidoro Beaton Stadium, Belmopan

28 December 2013
19:30

Verdes FC	4 – 1	FC Belize
Rodney Pacheco 32' (pen.); Marlon Meza 80', 90' (pen.); Richard Jimenez 85'		Leon Cadle 39'

Marshalleck Stadium, Benque Viejo del Carmen

==== Round 13 ====
5 January 2014
15:30

San Ignacio United	2 – 2	Verdes FC
Joel Guzman 30'; Carlos Vasquez 35'		Marlon Meza 73' (pen.); Richard Jimenez 83'

Norman Broaster Stadium, San Ignacio

5 January 2014
16:00

FC Belize	0 – 2	Police United
		Clifton West 37', 64'

MCC Grounds, Belize City

8 January 2014
19:30

Belmopan Bandits	0 – 0	Belize Defence Force

FFB Stadium, Belmopan

==== Round 14 ====
12 January 2014
19:00

Belize Defence Force	1 – 1	Paradise/Freedom Fighters
Carlton Thomas 80'		Alexander Peters 50'

Carl Ramos Stadium, Dangriga

12 January 2014
19:00

Police United	3 – 1	San Ignacio United
Clifton West 5', 54', 67'		Eric Guzman 53'

Isidoro Beaton Stadium, Belmopan

12 January 2014
19:00

Verdes FC	0 – 0	Belmopan Bandits

Marshalleck Stadium, Benque Viejo del Carmen

=== Playoffs ===
Semi-Finals
1	Verdes FC	0	1	1
4	FC Belize	0	2	2
2	Belize Defence Force	0	1	1
3	Belmopan Bandits	3	1	4

Finals
4	FC Belize	1	1	2
3	Belmopan Bandits	1	5	6

==== Semi-finals ====
Game One

18 January 2014
19:30

Belmopan Bandits	3 – 0	Belize Defence Force
David Trapp 23' (pen.); Deon McCaulay 69', 77' (pen.)

Isidoro Beaton Stadium, Belmopan

19 January 2014
16:00

FC Belize	0 – 0	Verdes FC

MCC Grounds, Belize City

Game Two

25 January 2014
19:30

Belize Defence Force	1 – 1	Belmopan Bandits
Shane Flores 90+'		Deon McCaulay 41'

Carl Ramos Stadium, Dangriga

26 January 2014
19:30

Verdes FC	1 – 2 (a.e.t.)	FC Belize
Rodney Pacheco 14' (pen.)		Jarret Davis 87' (pen.); Michael Hernandez 119'

Marshalleck Stadium, Benque Viejo del Carmen

==== Finals ====
Game One

2 February 2014
16:00

FC Belize	1 – 1	Belmopan Bandits
Mark Leslie 62'		Deon McCaulay 5'

MCC Grounds, Belize City

Game Two

8 February 2014
19:30

Belmopan Bandits	5 – 1	FC Belize
Deon McCaulay 37', 67' (pen.), 69', 71'; Denmark Casey Jr. 45'		Mark Leslie 39'

FFB Stadium, Belmopan

2013–14 Opening season champions

2nd title

=== Season statistics ===
==== Top scorers ====
Rank	Player	Team	Goals
1	(Belize) Deon McCaulay	Belmopan Bandits	13
2	(Belize) Jarret Davis	FC Belize	8
2	(Belize) Clifton West	Police United	8
4	(Belize) Franz Vernon	Paradise/Freedom Fighters	6
5	(Belize) Anthony Gonzalez	San Ignacio United	4
5	(Belize) Elroy Kuylen	Belmopan Bandits	4
5	(Belize) Marlon Meza	Verdes FC	4
5	(Belize) Khalil Velasquez	Belize Defence Force	4

(*) Please note playoff goals are included.

==== Hat tricks ====
Player	For	Against	Result	Date
(Belize) Elroy Kuylen	Belmopan Bandits	San Ignacio United	4–1 (H)	5 October 2013
(Belize) Clifton West	Police United	San Ignacio United	3–1 (H)	12 January 2014
(Belize) Deon McCaulay^{4}	Belmopan Bandits	FC Belize	5–1 (H)	8 February 2014

- ^{4} Player scored 4 goals

=== Awards ===
In the post-game ceremonies of the final game of the season, the individual awards were announced for the regular season.

Award	Recipient	Team
Most Goals (Regular Season)	(Belize) Clifton West	Police United
Most Goals (Overall)	(Belize) Deon McCaulay	Belmopan Bandits
MVP (Regular Season)	(Belize) Franz Vernon	Paradise/Freedom Fighters
MVP (Playoff)	(Belize) Deon McCaulay	Belmopan Bandits
Best Forward	(Belize) Clifton West	Police United
Best Midfielder	(Belize) Orlando Jimenez	Verdes FC
Best Defender	(Belize) Vallan Symms	Belize Defence Force
Best Goalkeeper	(Honduras) Benito Moreira	Verdes FC
Manager	(Belize) Lionel Cuthkelvin	Belize Defence Force
Manager	(Belize) Eric Vasquez	Verdes FC
Coach	(Honduras) Pablo Cacho	Verdes FC

== Closing season ==
All 7 of the teams competing in the opening season continued to play in the closing season. The format of the league was the same as the opening season, with the top 4 teams advancing to the end of season playoffs.

The closing season was expected to commence on 22 February 2014, however this was delayed due to concerns from the 7 teams. The league was subsequently handed over to the Football Federation of Belize, and a caretaker committee was put in place to administrate the closing season. The season commenced on 8 March 2014.

=== League table ===
Pos	Team	Pld	W	D	L	GF	GA	GD	Pts	Qualification
1	Police United	12	8	2	2	17	7	+10	26	Qualification to the Playoffs
2	Belmopan Bandits	12	4	6	2	13	7	+6	18	Qualification to the Playoffs
3	Verdes FC	12	5	3	4	11	9	+2	18	Qualification to the Playoffs
4	Belize Defence Force	12	5	2	5	14	13	+1	17	Qualification to the Playoffs
5	Paradise/Freedom Fighters	12	3	3	6	9	13	−4	12	
6	FC Belize	12	3	3	6	12	22	−10	12	
7	San Ignacio United	12	1	7	4	13	18	−5	10	

Source: Soccerway
Rules for classification: 1) points; 2) goal difference; 3) number of goals scored.

=== Results ===
==== Round 1 ====
8 March 2014
19:30

Belize Defence Force	0 – 1	Paradise/Freedom Fighters
		Franz Vernon 42'

Carl Ramos Stadium, Dangriga

8 March 2014
19:30

Belmopan Bandits	1 – 1	Verdes FC
Erick Rodriguez 67'		Marlon Meza 38'

Isidoro Beaton Stadium, Belmopan

9 March 2014
16:00

FC Belize	3 – 3	San Ignacio United
Jarret Davis 13', 19'; Michael Hernandez 86'		Carlos Vasquez 38'; Wilmer Garcia 58'; Trimayne Harris 60'

MCC Grounds, Belize City

==== Round 2 ====
15 March 2014
19:30

Police United	3 – 0	FC Belize
Clifton West 43' (pen.); Amin August Jr. 84'; Harrison Roches 89'

Isidoro Beaton Stadium, Belmopan

15 March 2014
19:30

Verdes FC	2 – 1	Belize Defence Force
Osman Espino 10'; Marlon Meza 76'		Khalil Velasquez 22'

Marshalleck Stadium, Benque Viejo del Carmen

16 March 2014
16:00

Paradise/Freedom Fighters	1 – 1	Belmopan Bandits
Darwaine Castillo 15'		Denmark Casey Jr. 17'

Toledo Union Field, Punta Gorda

==== Round 3 ====
19 March 2014
20:30

Belize Defence Force	4 – 2	FC Belize
Leonard Valdez 35'; Abraham Chavez 40'; Jorge Estrada O.G 45'; Khalil Velasquez 89'		Kristian Perez 15'; Jarret Davis 64'

Carl Ramos Stadium, Dangriga

19 March 2014
20:30

Belmopan Bandits	0 – 0	Police United

Isidoro Beaton Stadium, Belmopan

19 March 2014
20:30

San Ignacio United	0 – 2	Verdes FC
		Jamil Cano 61'; Gilroy Thurton 74'

Norman Broaster Stadium, San Ignacio

==== Round 4 ====
22 March 2014
19:30

Police United	1 – 0	Verdes FC
Harrison Roches 63'

Isidoro Beaton Stadium, Belmopan

23 March 2014
15:30

San Ignacio United	0 – 0	Paradise/Freedom Fighters

Norman Broaster Stadium, San Ignacio

23 March 2014
16:00

FC Belize	0 – 2	Belmopan Bandits
		Deris Benavides 35' (pen.); Jeromy James 89'

MCC Grounds, Belize City

==== Round 5 ====
26 March 2014
19:30

Paradise/Freedom Fighters	0 – 1	Police United
		Clifton West 88'

Toledo Union Field, Punta Gorda

26 March 2014
20:30

Belize Defence Force	2 – 0	San Ignacio United
Fredrick Flores 21'; Shane Flores 83'

Carl Ramos Stadium, Dangriga

26 March 2014
20:30

Verdes FC	1 – 2	FC Belize
Marlon Meza 52' (pen.)		Leon Cadle 30' (pen.); Francisco Brecenio 52'

Marshalleck Stadium, Benque Viejo del Carmen

==== Round 6 ====
29 March 2014
19:30

Police United	4 – 1	Belize Defence Force
Amin August Jr. 60'; Daniel Jimenez 67'; Clifton West 69', 84'		Leonard Valdez 89' (pen.)

Isidoro Beaton Stadium, Belmopan

30 March 2014
15:30

San Ignacio United	1 – 1	Belmopan Bandits
Edwani Munoz 82'		Woodrow West 34' (pen.)

Norman Broaster Stadium, San Ignacio

30 March 2014
16:00

FC Belize	0 – 0	Paradise/Freedom Fighters

MCC Grounds, Belize City

==== Round 7 ====
2 April 2014
19:30

Belmopan Bandits	1 – 0	Belize Defence Force
Brandon Peyrefitte 83'

Isidoro Beaton Stadium, Belmopan

2 April 2014
19:45

Paradise/Freedom Fighters	0 – 1	Verdes FC
		Richard Jimenez 68'

Toledo Union Field, Punta Gorda

2 April 2014
20:30

San Ignacio United	1 – 2	Police United
Anthony Gonzalez 14'		Amin August Jr. 8'; Daniel Jimenez 47'

Norman Broaster Stadium, San Ignacio

==== Round 8 ====
5 April 2014
19:30

Verdes FC	2 – 1	Belmopan Bandits
Nahjib Guerra 37'; Jamil Cano 84'		Elroy Kuylen 40'

Marshalleck Stadium, Benque Viejo del Carmen

6 April 2014
15:30

San Ignacio United	2 – 2	FC Belize
Anthony Gonzalez 43', 60'		Jarret Davis 41', 87' (pen.)

Norman Broaster Stadium, San Ignacio

6 April 2014
16:00

Paradise/Freedom Fighters	0 – 2	Belize Defence Force
		Stephen Martinez 12'; Shane Flores 81'

Toledo Union Field, Punta Gorda

==== Round 9 ====
11 April 2014
20:00

Belmopan Bandits	1 – 0	Paradise/Freedom Fighters
Elroy Kuylen 61'

Isidoro Beaton Stadium, Belmopan

12 April 2014
19:30

Belize Defence Force	0 – 0	Verdes FC

Carl Ramos Stadium, Dangriga

13 April 2014
17:00

FC Belize	1 – 0	Police United
Michael Whittaker 37'

MCC Grounds, Belize City

==== Round 10 ====
16 April 2014
19:30

Police United	2 – 1	Belmopan Bandits
Clifton West 35'; Harrison Roches 83'		Denmark Casey Jr. 55'

Isidoro Beaton Stadium, Belmopan

16 April 2014
19:30

Verdes FC	1 – 1	San Ignacio United
Marlon Meza 40' (pen.)		Anthony Gonzalez 24'

Marshalleck Stadium, Benque Viejo del Carmen

16 April 2014
20:30

FC Belize	0 – 1	Belize Defence Force
		Stephen Martinez 3'

MCC Grounds, Belize City

==== Round 11 ====
19 April 2014
19:00

Paradise/Freedom Fighters	3 – 4	San Ignacio United
Franz Vernon 20'; Darwaine Castillo 21', 77'		Trimayne Harris 25', 58'; Anthony Gonzalez 34'; Wilmer Garcia 90+'

Toledo Union Field, Punta Gorda

19 April 2014
19:30

Belmopan Bandits	4 – 0	FC Belize
Denmark Casey Jr. 44'; Elroy Kuylen 47'; Jeromy James 49', 82'

Isidoro Beaton Stadium, Belmopan

19 April 2014
19:30

Verdes FC	0 – 1	Police United
		Daniel Jimenez 37'

Marshalleck Stadium, Benque Viejo del Carmen

==== Round 12 ====
23 April 2014
19:45

Police United	1 – 2	Paradise/Freedom Fighters
Devon Makin 38'		Darwaine Castillo 12' (pen.); Frank Lopez 80'

Isidoro Beaton Stadium, Belmopan

23 April 2014
20:30

San Ignacio United	1 – 2	Belize Defence Force
Anthony Gonzalez 11' (pen.)		Leonard Valdez 53'; John King 82'

Norman Broaster Stadium, San Ignacio

24 April 2014
20:30

FC Belize	0 – 1	Verdes FC
		Nahjib Guerra 11'

MCC Grounds, Belize City

==== Round 13 ====
26 April 2014
19:30

Belize Defence Force	1 – 2	Police United
Vallan Symms 74'		Lennox Castillo 40'; Bernel Valdez 48'

Carl Ramos Stadium, Dangriga

26 April 2014
19:30

Belmopan Bandits	0 – 0	San Ignacio United

Isidoro Beaton Stadium, Belmopan

27 April 2014
15:30

Paradise/Freedom Fighters	1 – 2	FC Belize
Franz Vernon 78'		Jarret Davis 38'; Stephen Baizer 73'

Toledo Union Field, Punta Gorda

==== Round 14 ====
30 April 2014
20:30

Belize Defence Force	0 – 0	Belmopan Bandits

Carl Ramos Stadium, Dangriga

30 April 2014
20:30

Police United	0 – 0	San Ignacio United

Isidoro Beaton Stadium, Belmopan

30 April 2014
20:30

Verdes FC	0 – 1	Paradise/Freedom Fighters
		Darroll Lambey 56'

Marshalleck Stadium, Benque Viejo del Carmen

=== Playoffs ===
Semi-Finals
1	Police United	2	3	5
4	Belize Defence Force	1	0	1
2	Belmopan Bandits	1	1	2
3	Verdes FC	0	1	1

Finals
1	Police United	0	0	0
2	Belmopan Bandits	3	1	4

==== Semi-finals ====
Game One

3 May 2014
19:30

Belize Defence Force	1 – 2	Police United
Ambrose Thomas 81'		Clifton West 31'; Daniel Jimenez 87'

Carl Ramos Stadium, Dangriga

3 May 2014
19:30

Verdes FC	0 – 1	Belmopan Bandits
		Elroy Kuylen 68'

Marshalleck Stadium, Benque Viejo del Carmen

Game Two

7 May 2014
19:30

Belmopan Bandits	1 – 1	Verdes FC
Jeromy James 39'		Marlon Meza 70' (pen.)

Isidoro Beaton Stadium, Belmopan

8 May 2014
19:30

Police United	3 – 0	Belize Defence Force
Daniel Jimenez 18'; Luis Torres 46'; Clifton West 64'

Isidoro Beaton Stadium, Belmopan

==== Finals ====
Game One

10 May 2014
19:30

Belmopan Bandits	3 – 0	Police United
Jeromy James 53', 60'; Denmark Casey Jr. 67'

Isidoro Beaton Stadium, Belmopan

Game Two

17 May 2014
19:30

Police United	0 – 1	Belmopan Bandits
		Elroy Kuylen 80'

Isidoro Beaton Stadium, Belmopan

2013–14 Closing season champions

3rd title

=== Season statistics ===
==== Top scorers ====
Rank	Player	Team	Goals
1	(Belize) Clifton West	Police United	7
2	(Belize) Jarret Davis	FC Belize	6
2	(Belize) Anthony Gonzalez	San Ignacio United	6
2	(Belize) Jeromy James	Belmopan Bandits	6
5	(Belize) Daniel Jimenez	Police United	5
5	(Belize) Elroy Kuylen	Belmopan Bandits	5
5	(Belize) Marlon Meza	Verdes FC	5
8	(Belize) Denmark Casey Jr.	Belmopan Bandits	4
8	(Belize) Darwaine Castillo	Paradise/Freedom Fighters	4

(*) Please note playoff goals are included.

=== Awards ===
In the post-game ceremonies of the final game of the season, the individual awards were announced for the regular season.

Award	Recipient	Team
Most Goals (Regular Season)	(Belize) Jarret Davis	FC Belize
Most Goals (Regular Season)	(Belize) Anthony Gonzalez	San Ignacio United
Most Goals (Overall)	(Belize) Clifton West	Police United
MVP (Regular Season)	(Belize) Keith Allen	Police United
MVP (Playoff)	(Belize) Jeromy James	Belmopan Bandits
Best Forward	(Belize) Anthony Gonzalez	San Ignacio United
Best Midfielder	(Belize) Denmark Casey Jr.	Belmopan Bandits
Best Defender	(Belize) Cristobal Gilharry	Police United
Best Goalkeeper	(Belize) Keith Allen	Police United
Manager	(Belize) Alford Grinage	Police United
Coach	(Belize) Hilberto Muschamp	Police United
