= Belikin =

Belizean beer brand

Belikin Beer
- Belikin label
- Company type: Private
- Industry: Beer (brand)
- Founded: 1969; 56 years ago
- Founder: Bowen Family
- Headquarters: 1969 Belikin Boulevard Ladyville, Belize, Belize
- Area served: Belize
- Key people: Michael H.M. Bowen (President/CEO); Nolan Michael (Brew Master)
- Parent: Belize Brewing Company
- Website: www.belikin.bz

Belikin Beer is produced by the Belize Brewing Company. There are several varieties, including Belikin Beer, Belikin Stout, and seasonal brews.

== Name Origin ==
The root of the name “Belikin” dates to the ancient Maya Classical Period and is an amalgamation of several Mayan words with the meaning either ‘road to the east’ or ‘road to the burning sun.’
