= Victor Sanchez Union Field =

Stadium in Punta Gorda, Belize

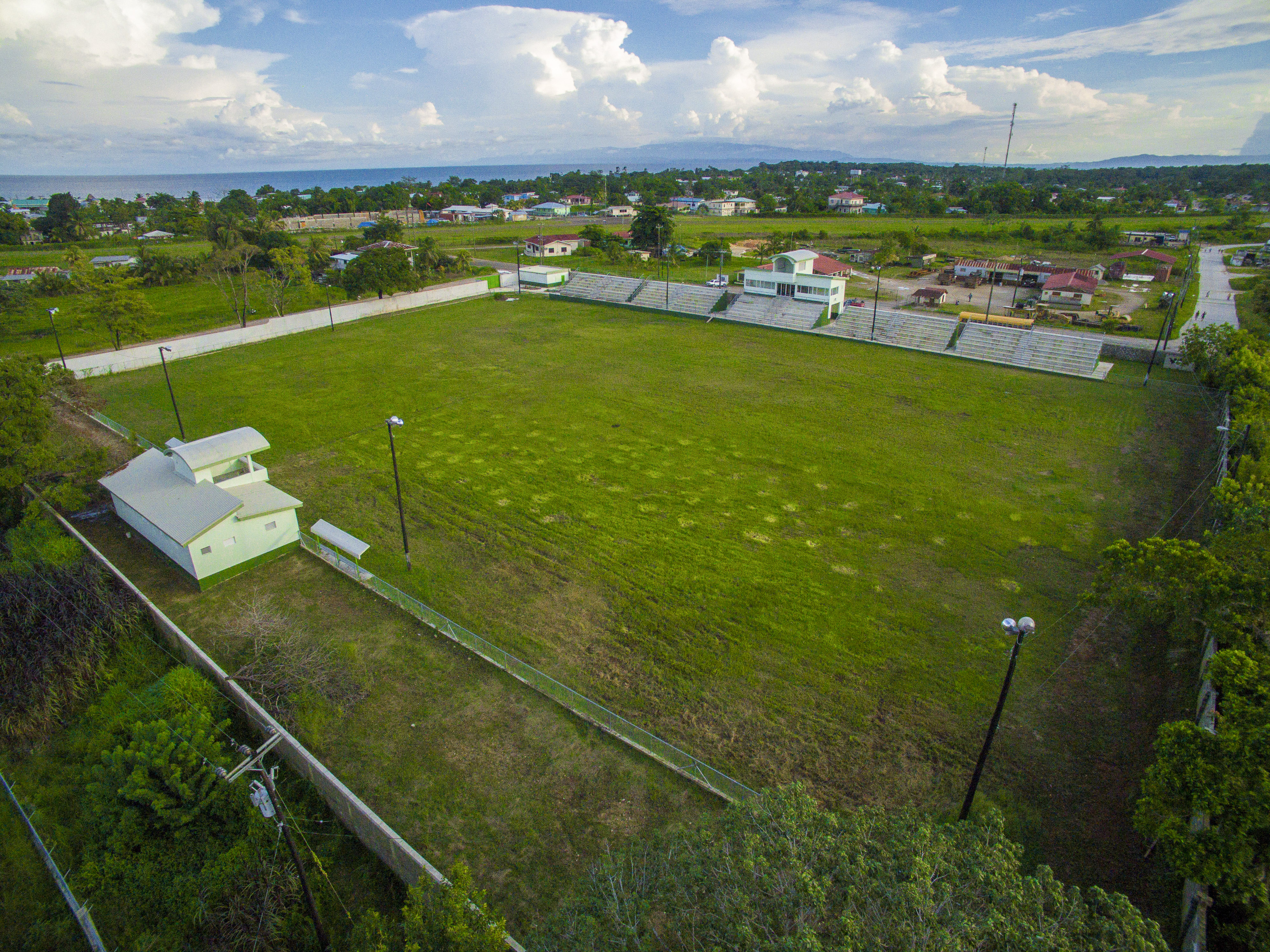
- Interactive map of Victor Sanchez Union Field
- Former names: Toledo Union Field
- Location: Punta Gorda, Toledo, Belize
- Coordinates: 16°6′14″N 88°48′29″W
- Capacity: 1,500
- Surface: Grass

Construction
- Opened: December 2016; 9 years ago

Tenant
- Valley Pride Freedom Fighters FC (present)

Victor Sanchez Union Field (formerly, Toledo Union Field) is a football stadium in Punta Gorda, Toledo, Belize. It is the home stadium of the team, Freedom Fighters FC that is part of the Premier League of Belize.
