= 2022 in Belize =

- Decades: 2000s; 2010s; 2020s
- See also: Other events of 2022; Timeline of Belizean history

The following lists events in the year 2022 in Belize.

== Incumbents ==
- Monarch: Elizabeth II (until 8 September), then Charles III
- Governor-General: Froyla Tzalam
- Prime Minister: Johnny Briceño
- Chief Justice: Michelle Arana (until 2 September); Louise Blenman onwards

== Events ==
Ongoing — COVID-19 pandemic in Belize

- 1 January – 2022 New Year Honours.
- 14 March - Commonwealth Day.
- 1 August - Emancipation Day.
- 12 August - A Belize-flagged ship departs Chornomorsk for Turkey, becoming the first wheat export from Ukraine under a United Nations-brokered deal.
- 10–21 September — September Celebrations, including Battle of St. George's Caye Day (1798) and Independence Day (1981).
- 8 September – Accession of Charles III as King of Belize following the death of Queen Elizabeth II.
- 9 September – Church bells across Belize toll at 8 am to symbolise the beginning of the reign of Belize's new monarch – King Charles III.
- 19 September – A national holiday is observed on the day of the funeral of Elizabeth II, Queen of Belize. The Governor-General attends the Queen's state funeral in the United Kingdom.

== Deaths ==
- 10 February – Sir Manuel Esquivel, politician (b. 1940)
- 6 April - Melvin Hulse, politician (b. 1947)
- 10 July - Theodore Aranda, politician (b. 1934)
- 8 September - Elizabeth II, Queen of Belize (b. 1926)

== See also ==
- 2022 in the Caribbean
- 2022 in Central America
- COVID-19 pandemic in North America
- 2022 Atlantic hurricane season
