= 2026 in Belize =

- Decades: 2000s; 2010s; 2020s
- See also: Other events of 2026; Timeline of Belizean history

The following lists events in the year 2026 in Belize.

== Incumbents ==
- Monarch: Charles III
- Governor-General: Froyla Tzalam
- Prime Minister: Johnny Briceño
- Chief Justice: Louise Blenman

== Holidays ==
- 1 January– New Year's Day
- 15 January – George Price Day
- 9 March – National Heroes & Benefactors Day
- 3 April – Good Friday
- 4 April – Holy Saturday
- 6 April – Easter Monday
- 1 May – Labour Day
- 1 August – Emancipation Day
- 10 September – St. George's Caye Day
- 21 September – Independence Day
- 12 October – Indigenous Peoples’ Resistance Day
- 19 November – Garifuna Settlement Day
- 25 December – Christmas Day
- 26 December – Boxing Day
