= 2021 in Belize =

- Decades: 2000s; 2010s; 2020s
- See also: Other events of 2021; Timeline of Belizean history

The following lists events in the year 2021 in Belize.

== Incumbents ==
- Monarch: Elizabeth II
- Governor-General: Colville Young (to 30 April 2021), Stuart Leslie (acting from 1 to 27 May 2021), Froyla Tzalam (since 27 May 2021)
- Prime Minister: Johnny Briceño
- Chief Justice: Michelle Arana (acting since 20 March 2020)

== Events ==
Ongoing — COVID-19 pandemic in Belize

- 1 January – 2021 New Year Honours
- 15 January – George Cadle Price Day, honours the 1st Prime Minister (1989-1993).
- 12 June – Marcelo Ebrard, Mexican Foreign Minister, announced on May 12, 2021, that Mexico will donate 400,000 doses of Oxford–AstraZeneca COVID-19 vaccine to Bolivia, Belize, and Paraguay.
- 20 November — Destiny Wagner wins Miss Earth 2021, this is the first time that Belize won in one of the most prestigious Big Four international beauty pageants.

=== Scheduled ===
- 24 May – Commonwealth Day.
- 1 August – Emancipation Day, Starting 2021, Belize joins other Caribbean nations in the observance of Emancipation Day to commemorate the emancipation of enslaved people in 1843.
- 10–21 September — September Celebrations, including Battle of St. George's Caye Day (1798) and Independence Day (1981).

== Deaths ==
- 1 January – Dame Elmira Minita Gordon, politician, Governor-General (1981 to 1993).

== See also ==
- 2021 in the Caribbean
- 2021 in Central America
- COVID-19 pandemic in North America
- 2021 Atlantic hurricane season
