= 2024 in Belize =

- Decades: 2000s; 2010s; 2020s
- See also: Other events of 2024; Timeline of Belizean history

The following lists events in the year 2024 in Belize.

== Incumbents ==
- Monarch: Charles III
- Governor-General: Froyla Tzalam
- Prime Minister: Johnny Briceño
- Chief Justice: Louise Blenman

== Events ==
- 5 February – Charles III, King of Belize, is diagnosed with a form of cancer.
- 24 February – The Belizean abandoned cargo ship Rubymar, that was hit by a Houthi missile, is causing an environmental disaster and is at risk of sinking.
- 6 March – 2024 Belize local elections

== Holidays ==
- 1 January – New Year's Day
- January 15 – George Price Day
- March 11 – National Heroes & Benefactors Day
- 29 March – Good Friday
- 30 March – Holy Saturday
- 1 April – Easter Monday
- 29 April – Labour Day (in lieu of Wednesday, 1 May)
- 1 August – Emancipation Day
- 10 September – St. George's Caye Day
- 21 September – Independence Day
- 14 October – Indigenous Peoples’ Resistance Day (in lieu of Saturday, 12 October)
- 19 November – Garifuna Settlement Day
- 25 December – Christmas Day
- 26 December – Boxing Day

== Deaths ==
- 1 January – Lawrence Sydney Nicasio, 67, Roman Catholic prelate, bishop of Belize City-Belmopan (since 2017).
