= 2023 in Belize =

- Decades: 2000s; 2010s; 2020s
- See also: Other events of 2023; Timeline of Belizean history

The following lists events in the year 2023 in Belize.

== Incumbents ==
- Monarch: Charles III
- Governor-General: Froyla Tzalam
- Prime Minister: Johnny Briceño
- Chief Justice: Louise Blenman

== Events ==
Ongoing — COVID-19 pandemic in Belize

- 1 January – 2023 New Year Honours.
- 14 March - Commonwealth Day.
- 1 August - Emancipation Day.
- 2022–23 Premier League of Belize
- 26 April - Jasmine Hartin pled guilty to the manslaughter of police officer Henry Jemmott
- 6 May – Coronation of Charles III as King of Belize and the other Commonwealth realms. Governor-General Dame Froyla Tzalam attend the ceremony in London.
- 14 November – Belize suspends diplomatic relations with Israel over its war conduct and calls for an immediate ceasefire.

== See also ==
- COVID-19 pandemic in North America
- 2023 Atlantic hurricane season
