= 2025 in Belize =

- Decades: 2000s; 2010s; 2020s
- See also: Other events of 2025; Timeline of Belizean history

The following lists events in the year 2025 in Belize.

== Incumbents ==
- Monarch: Charles III
- Governor-General: Froyla Tzalam
- Prime Minister: Johnny Briceño
- Chief Justice: Louise Blenman

== Events ==
- 22 February – Three US nationals are found dead in a suspected drug overdose at the Royal Kahal Beach Resort in San Pedro Town.
- 12 March – 2025 Belizean general election: The ruling People's United Party wins 26 seats in the House of Representatives, with the opposition United Democratic Party winning the remaining five seats in the chamber.
- 17 April – A US national hijacks Tropic Air Flight 711 flying from Corozal to San Pedro, stabbing and injuring two passengers. He is shot dead by another passenger after the aircraft makes an emergency landing at Philip S. W. Goldson International Airport in Belize City.
- 15 August – Mexico, Guatemala and Belize announce an agreement to create a tri-national nature reserve to protect the Maya Forest.
- 1 October – An agreement allowing absolute freedom of movement for nationals of Barbados, Belize, Dominica and Saint Vincent and the Grenadines travelling between their countries comes into effect.
- 20 October – Belize signs an agreement with the United States allowing for migrants deported from the US to be sent to Belize.

== Holidays ==
- January 1 – New Year's Day
- January 15 – George Price Day
- March 10 – National Heroes & Benefactors Day
- 18 April – Good Friday
- 19 April – Holy Saturday
- 21 April – Easter Monday
- 1 May – Labour Day
- 1 August – Emancipation Day
- 10 September – St. George's Caye Day
- 21 September – Independence Day
- 13 October – Indigenous Peoples’ Resistance Day
- 19 November – Garifuna Settlement Day
- 25 December – Christmas Day
- 26 December – Boxing Day

== Deaths ==
- 20 April – Chito Martínez, 59, Major League Baseball player.
- 6 June – Ralph Fonseca, 75, politician and member of the People's United Party.
