= 2022 in Central America =

The following lists events that happened during 2022 in Central America.

== Incumbents ==
=== Belize ===
(Belize)

- Chief of state: Queen Elizabeth II (until September 8) Charles III onwards
- Represented by Governor-General Dame Froyla Tzalam
- Head of Government: Prime Minister Johnny Briceno (starting 2020)

=== Costa Rica ===
(Costa Rica)

- Chief of state and Head of Government: President Carlos Alvarado Quesada (until May 7, 2018) Rodrigo Chaves Robles onwards
  - First Vice President Stephan Brunner; (since 2022)
  - Second Vice President Mary Munive (since 2022)

=== El Salvador ===
(El Salvador)

- Chief of state and Head of Government: President Nayib Bukele Ortez (since 2019)
- Vice President Felix Augusto Antonio Ulloa Garay (since 2019)

=== Guatemala ===
(Guatemala)

- Chief of state and Head of government: President Alejandro Eduardo Giammattei Falla (since 2020)
- Vice-president César Guillermo Castillo Reyes (since 2020)

=== Honduras ===
(Honduras)

- Chief of state and Head of Government: President Xiomara Castro (since 2022)
- Vice Presidents: Salvador Nasralla, Doris Gutiérrez, Renato Florentino (since 2022)

=== Nicaragua ===
(Nicaragua)

- Chief of state and Head of government: President Daniel Ortega (since 2007)
- Vice President Rosario Murillo Zambrana (since 2017)

=== Panama ===
(Panama)

- Chief of state and Head of Government: President Laurentino "Nito" Cortizo Cohen (since 2019)
- Vice President Jose Gabriel Carrizo Jaen (since 2019)

== Events ==
=== Elections ===
- 6 February: 2022 Costa Rican general election

=== Holidays ===
==== January to March ====
- January 1 – New Year's Day
- January 9 – Martyrs' Day (Panama)
- February 14–15 – Carnival, Public holidays in Panama
- March 2 – Ash Wednesday, Panama
- March 7 – National Heroes & Benefactors Day, Belize.
- March 14 – Commonwealth Day, Belize

==== April to June ====
- April 14 – Holy Thursday, Costa Rica
- April 15 – Good Friday
- April 16 – Holy Saturday
- April 18 – Easter Monday
- April 11 – Juan Santamaría Day, Costa Rica
- April 14 – Pan American Day, Honduras
- May 1 – Labour Day, International Workers' Day
- June 30 – Army Day, Public holidays in Guatemala

==== July to September ====
- July 19 – Sandinista Revolution Day, Public holidays in Nicaragua
- July 25 – Guanacaste Day, Costa Rica
- August 2 – Virgin of Los Angeles Day, Costa Rica
- August 3 – Fiesta of San Salvador, celebrated in El Salvador
- September 10 – Saint George's Caye Day, Belize
- September 14 – San Jacinto Day, Nicaragua
- September 15/20 – Act of Independence of Central America, independence from Spain in 1821; celebrated in Costa Rica, El Salvador, Guatemala, Honduras Nicaragua
- September 21 – Independence Day, Belize

==== October to December ====
- October 7 – Francisco Morazán′s Birthday, Honduras
- October 21 – Armed Forces of Honduras Day
- October 12 – Pan America Day, Belize
- October 20 – Guatemalan Revolution Day
- November 1 – All Saints' Day, celebrated in Guatemala
- November 3 – Separation Day (from Colombia, 1903), Panama
- November 4 – Flag of Panama Day
- November 5 – Colón Day, Panama
- November 10 – Los Santos Uprising Day, Panama
- November 19 – Garifuna Settlement Day, Belize
- November 29 – Independence Day, Panama
- December 8 – Feast of the Immaculate Conception, Nicaragua Panama
- December 25 – Christmas Day
- December 27 – Boxing Day, Belize

== Sports ==
- 26 July - November 3: 2022 CONCACAF League

== Deaths ==
- February 10 – Manuel Esquivel, Prime minister of Belize (1984-1989)

== See also ==
- 2022 in the Caribbean
- COVID-19 pandemic in North America
- 2020s
- 2020s in political history
- Central American Parliament
- List of state leaders in Central America in 2022
- 2022 Atlantic hurricane season
