= Public holidays in Belize =

This is a list of public holidays in Belize.

== Public holidays ==
Date	Day	Observance	Observance rule	Explanatory note
1 January		New Year's Day	fixed at 1 January (see Note 1)	
15 January		George Price Day	15 January (see Note 2)	This day was established in 2021 to commemorate Belize's only premier and first Prime Minister, George Cadle Price.
**	Monday	George Price Day (in lieu of)	see Note 2	
9 March		National Heroes & Benefactors Day	9 March (see Note 2)	This day was originally designated "Baron Bliss Day" to honor a wealthy Englishman who left his fortune to the former British Honduras.
**	Monday	National Heroes and Benefactors Day (in lieu of)	see Note 2	
*	Friday	Good Friday	fixed by church calendar (moveable)	Crucifixion of Jesus
*	Saturday	Holy Saturday	fixed by church calendar (moveable)	
*	Sunday	Easter	fixed by church calendar (moveable)	Resurrection of Jesus
*	Monday	Easter Monday	fixed by church calendar (moveable)	
1 May		Labour Day	fixed at May 1 (see Note 1)	Also called International Workers' Day
**	Monday	Labour Day (in lieu of)	see Note 1	
1 August		Emancipation Day	fixed at 1 August (see Note 1)	
**	Monday	Emancipation Day (in lieu of)	see Note 1	
24 May		Commonwealth Day	24 May (see Note 2)	Formerly Sovereign's Day; honors the monarch's birthday
**	Monday	Commonwealth Day (in lieu of)	see Note 1	
10 September		Saint George's Caye Day (or National Day)	fixed at 10 September (see Note 1)	The Battle of St. George's Caye was a key battle involving British colonists, freed slaves who worked as lumber cutters, and pirates who fought against the Spanish Empire in 1798. There is an annual regatta in San Pedro Town.
21 September		Independence Day	fixed at 21 September (see Note 1)	"British Honduras" became "Belize" in 1973 and was granted independence by Great Britain in 1981.
**	Monday	Independence Day (in lieu of)	see Note 1	
12 October		Indigenous People's Resistance Day	12 October (see Note 2)	Formerly called Columbus Day and Pan American Day
**	Monday	Indigenous People's Resistance Day (in lieu of)	See Note 2	
19 November		Garifuna Settlement Day	fixed at 19 November (see Note 1)	Since 1941, this holiday has honoured the Garifuna people, a group of mixed-race people with African and Carib roots.
25 December		Christmas Day	fixed at 25 December (see Note 1)	Birth of Jesus
26 December		Boxing Day	fixed at 26 December (see Note 1)	This is a day set aside for charitable works, although many people participate in sports or go shopping.
**	Monday	Boxing Day (in lieu of)	see Note 1	

- (*) Moveable holidays
- (**) Replacement days:
  - Note 1 – Chapter 289 of the laws of Belize states that if the holiday falls on a Sunday, the following Monday is observed as the bank and public holiday.
  - Note 2 – Chapter 289 of the laws of Belize states that if the holiday falls on a Sunday or a Friday, the following Monday is observed as the bank and public holiday; further, if the holiday falls on a Tuesday, Wednesday or Thursday, the preceding Monday is observed as the bank and public holiday.
