= Government House, Belize =

Colonial structure in Belize

Coordinates: 17°29′18″N 88°11′12″W

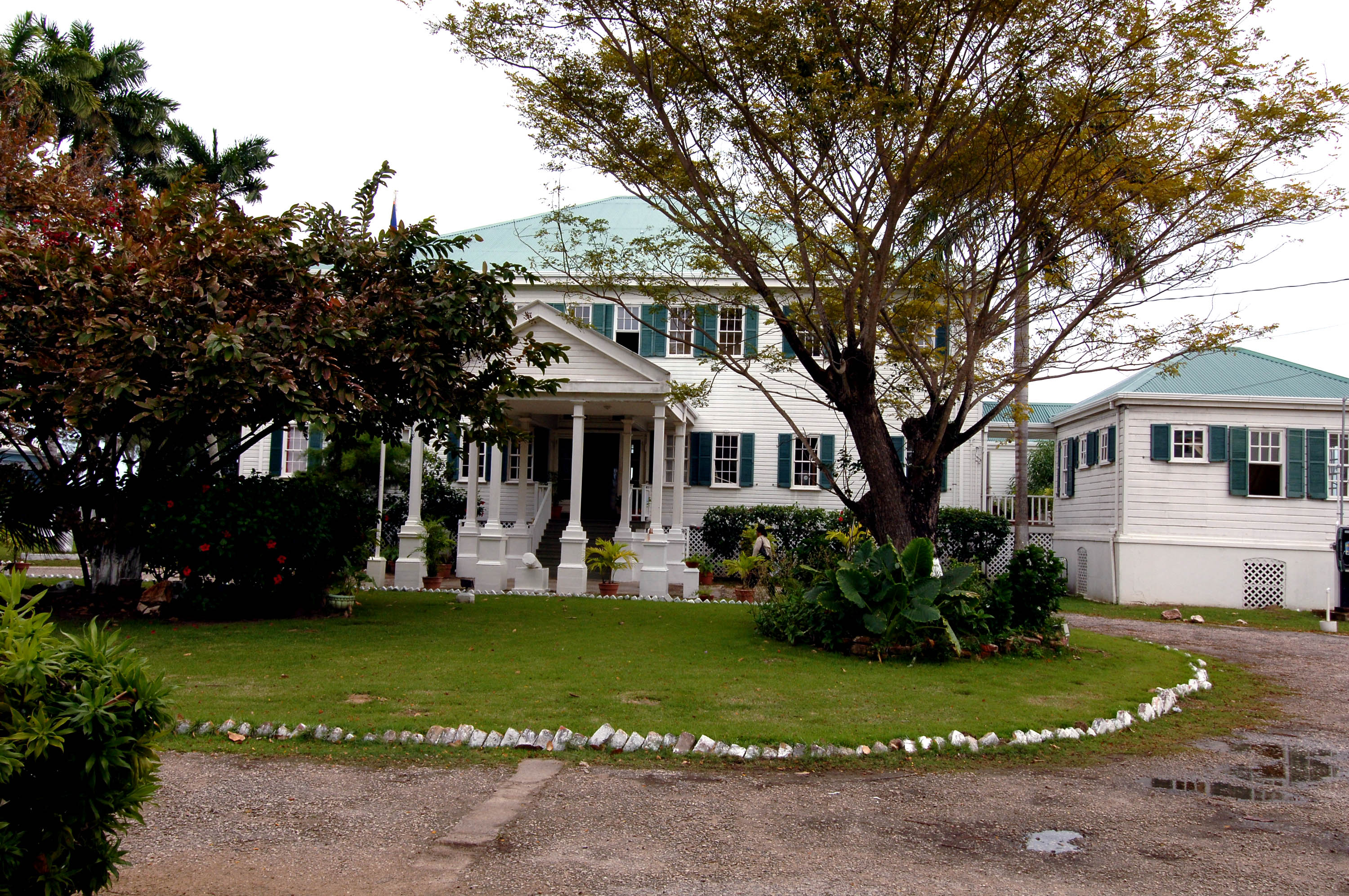
Former Government House in 2006

Government House (now the House of Culture Museum) is a colonial building in Belize City, Belize. It is said to have been built to plans by the British architect Christopher Wren with a combination of Caribbean vernacular and English urban architecture.

Erected in 1814, it was first the residence of the governor of British Honduras and later the residence of the governor general, the monarch's representative in Belize. After the rest of the government moved to Belmopan in the wake of Hurricane Hattie (1961), the house later became a venue for social functions and a guest house for visiting VIPs.

Eventually, the house was converted into a historical museum. The museum features exhibits of colonial glassware, silverware, and furniture. It also houses a collection of archival records.

Belize House in Belmopan became the official residence of the governor general in 1984. Built in 1981, it was the former British High Commission.

== See also ==
- Government Houses of the British Empire
- Governors General of Belize
