= Stuart Leslie =

Belizean public servant and ambassador

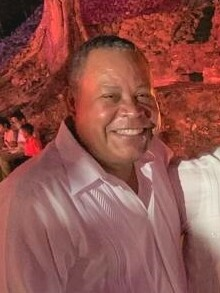
Stuart Leslie in 2022

H.E., Stuart Leslie (Born September 30, 1964) is a Belizean public servant and ambassador. He served as Belize's Permanent Representative to the United Nations from 2000 to 2005. He served as Belize's Chief Elections Officer from September 2005 to December 2006. In January 2006, he took up a new appointment as the Ambassador of Trade in the Ministry of Foreign Affairs and Foreign Trade. He currently serves as the Cabinet Secretary and Chief of Staff to the Hon. Prime Minister of Belize, John Briceño.

Following the retirement of Sir Colville Young on 30 April 2021, he became acting Governor-General of Belize. Leslie served in that capacity until Froyla Tzalam was sworn in as the new Governor-General.
