= Public holidays in Guatemala =

This is a list of public holidays in Guatemala.

== Public holidays ==
The Guatemalan Labor Code recognizes the following dates as public holidays with paid leave (unless marked as "Bank holiday"):

Date	English name	Local name	Remarks
January 1	New Year's Day	New Year's Day	The celebration of the first day of the Gregorian Calendar.
March or April	Holy Week	Semana Santa	Maundy Thursday, Good Friday, and Holy Saturday are official holidays.
May 1	Labour Day	Día del Trabajo	Also called International Workers' Day
June 30	Army Day	Día del Ejército	
August 15	Assumption Day	Día de la Asunción	Assumption of Mary into Heaven (only in Guatemala City)
September 15	Independence Day	Día de la Independencia	Celebrates the Act of Independence of Central America in 1821.
October 20	Revolution Day	Día de la Revolución	Celebrates the "Ten Years of Spring," the democratic period that began with the uprising against Jorge Ubico in 1944.
November 1	All Saints' Day	Día de Todos los Santos	
December 24	Christmas Eve	Noche Buena	From noon onward
December 25	Christmas Day	Navidad	
December 31	New Year's Eve	Víspera de Año Nuevo	

== Dates of variable holidays ==
- 2020
  - April 9–11 – Holy Week
  - June 29 – Army Day
- 2021
  - April 1–3 – Holy Week
  - June 30 – Army Day
  - September 22 – September equinox
  - December 21 – December solstice
- 2022
  - March 20 – March equinox
  - April 14–16 – Holy Week
  - June 30 – Army Day
  - December 21 – December solstice
- 2023
  - March 20 – March equinox
  - April 6–8 – Holy Week
  - June 30 – Army Day
- 2024
  - March 28–30 – Holy Week
  - June 20 – June solstice
  - June 30 – Army Day
  - September 23 – September equinox

== See also ==
- Holy Week processions in Guatemala
