= 2020 in Central America =

Guatemala, El Salvador, Honduras, Nicaragua, Costa Rica, Panama and Belize are historically the seven nations in Central America politically and geographically.

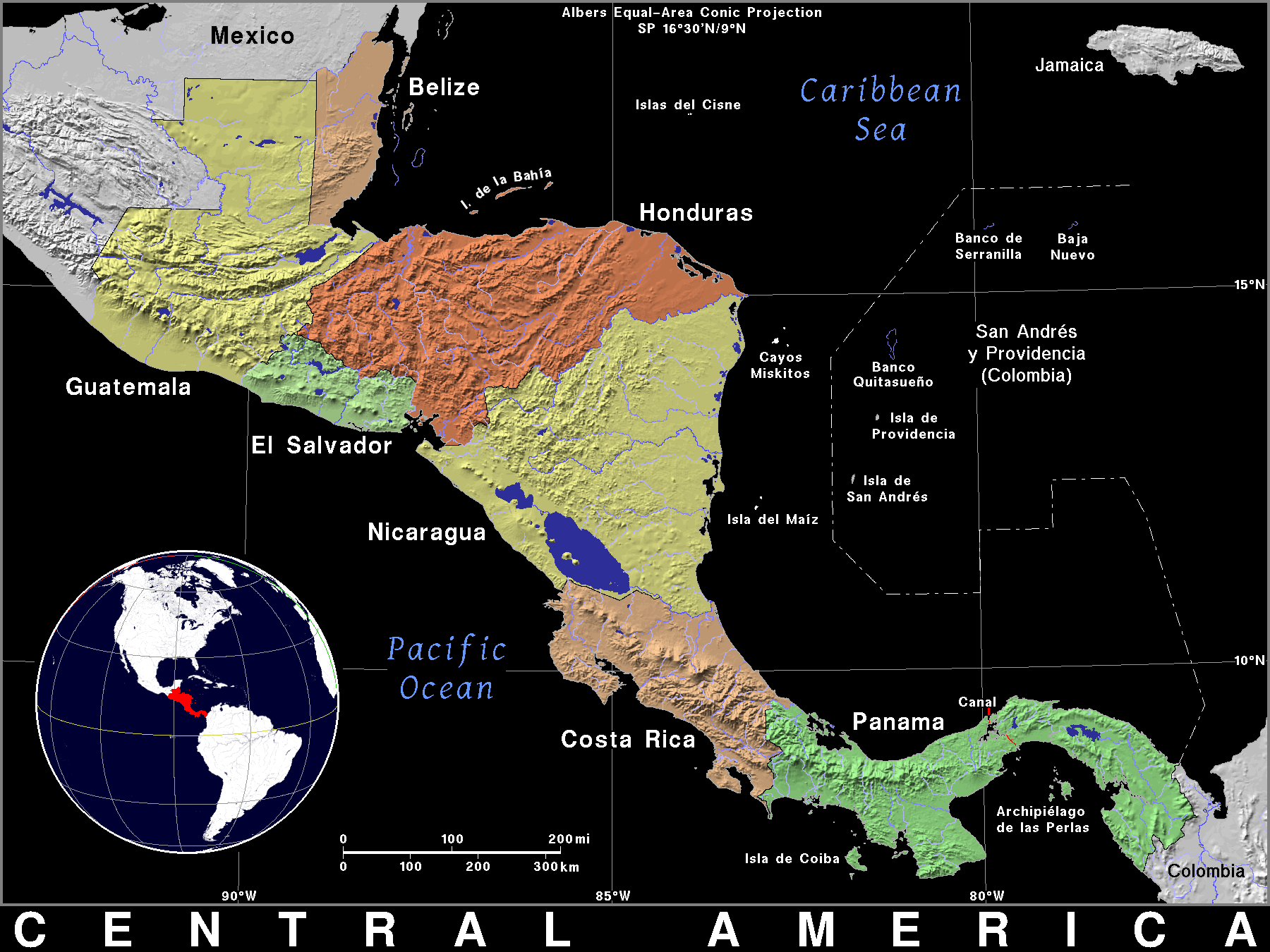
Central America geography

The following lists events that happened during 2020 in Central America: Belize, Costa Rica, El Salvador, Guatemala, Honduras, Nicaragua, and Panama.

The combined population of Central America is estimated at 44.53 million (2016).

== Incumbents ==
=== Belize ===
Britain granted British Honduras self-government in 1964; on June 1, 1973, it was renamed Belize. Independence was achieved on September 21, 1981. The capital is Belmopan.

- Chief of state: Queen Elizabeth II (since 6 February 1952)
- Represented by Governor-General Sir Colville Young (since 17 November 1993)
- Head of Government: Prime Minister
  - Dean Barrow (8 February 2008 – 12 November 2020)
  - Johnny Briceno (starting 12 November 2020)
- Deputy Prime Minister Patrick Faber (since 7 June 2016)

=== Costa Rica ===
Authorities declared the independence of Central America on September 15, 1821, becoming part of the First Mexican Empire. From 1823 to 1838 it was part of the Federal Republic of Central America; in 1838 it became the Free State of Costa Rica, which gave way to the Republic of Costa Rica in 1848. The capital is San José.

- Chief of state and Head of Government: President Carlos Alvarado Quesada (since 8 May 2018)
  - First Vice President Epsy Campbell Barr (since 8 May 2018)
  - Second Vice President Marvin Rodríguez Cordero (since 8 May 2018)

=== El Salvador ===
In 1821 El Salvador became part of the First Mexican Empire, which gave way to the Federal Republic of Central America in 1823. That lasted until 1841. El Salvador was independent until it joined the Greater Republic of Central America from 1896 to 1898 when it became independent once again. The capital of the Republic of El Salvador is San Salvador.

- Chief of state and Head of Government: President Nayib Bukele Ortez (since 1 June 2019)
  - Vice President Felix Augusto Antonio Ulloa Garay (since 1 June 2019)

=== Guatemala ===
The Captaincy General of Guatemala declared independence from Spain on September 15, 1821, when it was absorbed by the Mexican Empire. From 1823 to 1841it was part of the Federal Republic of Central America. On March 21, 1847, Guatemala declared itself an independent republic. The capital of the Republic of Guatemala is Guatemala City.

- Chief of state and Head of government: President
  - Jimmy Morales (until January 14, 2020)
  - Alejandro Eduardo Giammattei Falla (January 14, 2020—present)
- Vice-President
  - Jafeth Cabrera (until January 14, 2020)
  - César Guillermo Castillo Reyes (January 14, 2020—present)

=== Honduras ===
Honduras gained independence from Spain in 1821 and was a part of the Mexican Empire until 1823, when it became part of the Federal Republic of Central America. The Republic of Honduras was established 1838. Its capital is Tegucigalpa.

- Chief of state and Head of Government: President Juan Orlando Hernandez Alvarado (since 27 January 2014)
  - Vice Presidents: Ricardo Alvarez, Olga Alvarado, Maria Rivera (since 26 January 2018)

=== Nicaragua ===
The Captaincy General of Guatemala was dissolved in September 1821, and Nicaragua became part of the First Mexican Empire. In 1823, Nicaragua joined the newly formed the United Provinces of Central America, (later the Federal Republic of Central America). Nicaragua finally became an independent republic in 1838. The capital of the Republic of Nicaragua is Managua.

- Chief of state and Head of government: President Daniel Ortega (since 10 January 2007)
  - Vice President Rosario Murillo Zambrana (since 10 January 2017)

=== Panama ===
The Independence of Panama from Spain was accomplished through a bloodless revolt between in November 1821 after which time it joined Gran Colombia. Panama separated from Colombia on November 3, 1903, and signed the a treaty establishing the Panama Canal Zone. The Canal Zone was abolished in 1979; the Panama Canal itself remained under joint U.S.–Panamanian control until 1999. Panama City is the capital of the Republic of Panama.

- Chief of state and Head of Government: President Laurentino "Nito" Cortizo Cohen (since 1 July 2019)
  - Vice President Jose Gabriel Carrizo Jaen (since 1 July 2019)

== Monthly events ==
=== January ===
- January 1 – New Year's Day
- January 7 – The Panama Canal watershed is at its fifth driest in 70 years, according to the Panama Canal Authority.
- January 9
  - Martyrs' Day (Panama)
  - Federal marshalls in Carson City, United States, arrest Salvadoran Rene Antonio “Scrapy” Hernandez-Mejia, whom they say was part of a terrorist organization. They intend to deport him back to El Salvador.
- January 14 – New President Alejandro Giammattei of Guatemala takes office after a five-hour delay due to protests. Outgoing president Morales is pelted with eggs.
- January 16
  - Guatemala breaks off diplomatic relations with Venezuela.
  - Arrest warrants on corruption charges are issued for eight politicians in Guatemala; former congresswoman Aracely Chavarria and former mayor Angel Ren of Chiché, Guatemala, are arrested.
- January 18
  - The United States Border Patrol tries to deport a sick Honduran woman and her two sick children, ages six and one, to Guatemala.
  - Mexico stops thousands of Honduran immigrants on the border with Guatemala.
- January 20: Thousands of Honduran migrants and asylum-seekers battle with Mexican National Guard and try to force their way across the Suchiate River near Ayutla, San Marcos, Guatemala.
  - The Guatemala government seizes two farms belonging to former Minister of Communications, Infrastructure, and Housing, Alejandro Sinibaldi.
- January 22 – Guatemala is seen as the fifth most corrupt country in the world.
- January 24 – Calm returns to the Mexico-Guatemala border after 800 Honduran immigrants were arrested on January 23.
- January 27: Guatemalan President Giammattei offers El Salvador an opportunity to build and operate a port in Guatemalan waters in the Atlantic.
- January 31
  - Eighty armed individuals attack the indigenous community of Mayagna Sauni, Nicaragua, located 400 kilometers from Managua, burning houses while leaving six dead and ten missing.
  - Photographer Caroline Power discovers a "blanket" of plastic measuring 5 by 3 kilometres (3 by 2 mi) near Roatán Island, Honduras. It is believed to have been washed from the Motagua River during heavy rains in Guatemala.

=== February ===
- February 1 – The United States deported a record 4,171 Guatemalans (3,000 men, 692 women, 479 minors), a 2.27% increase over 2019, during the month of January, according to the Instituto Guatemalteco de Migración (Guatemalan Institute of Migration, IGM).
- February 2
  - 2020 Costa Rican municipal elections
    - 2020 San José mayoral election won by Johnny Araya Monge
  - Young people and adults denounce torture and other human rights violations by the Nicaraguan paramilitary groups. At least six cases of torture are documented.
- February 3
  - Our Lady of Suyapa, Honduras
  - Convicted prisoner Gilberto Ventura Ceballos escapes from La Joyita Prison in Pacora, Panama for the second time. The government has offered a US$50,000 reward for his recapture.
- February 4
  - 200,000 people participate in an earthquake drill held on the 44th anniversary of the 1976 Guatemala earthquake in which 22,000 people died.
  - A Costa Rican judge nullifies a same-sex marriage between two women and fires the Civil law notary who performed the marriage in 2015.
  - Oscar Dávila, 44, is appointed to head the investigations into government corruption in Guatemala.
- February 5
  - Panamanian President Laurentino Cortizo fires Security Minister Rolando Mirones and Government Minister Carlos Romero after the February 3 prison escape of Gilberto Ventura Ceballos.
  - The government of El Salvador says it is not ready to accept asylum-seekers and will not accept them from the United States.
- February 6 – In a visit to the Mexican Senate, the President of Guatemala, Alejandro Giammattei suggests the two countries construct ‘’Muros de Prosperidad’’ ("Prosperity Walls") in the form of an investment bank in the Mexican states of Chiapas and Tabasco and the Guatemalan departments of San Marcos, Quiché, and Huehuetenango in order to stem migration.
- February 7
  - The government of Nicaragua lifts its 500-day blockade of paper and ink against La Prensa, Managua's oldest newspaper.
  - The Office of the United Nations High Commissioner for Human Rights provides US$4.1 million for Nicaraguan and Venezuelan asylum seekers in Costa Rica.
  - The United States offers thousands of H-2B visas to temporary agricultural workers from Guatemala and El Salvador.
  - Human Rights Watch reports that at least 138 Salvadoran migrants who have been repatriated from the United States have been killed.
- February 8
  - According to the Climate Change Performance Index (CCPI), Honduras was the second-most country affected by climate change. The town of Cedeño loses 122 centimeters (48”) of land to the sea every year. Like Honduras, certain Caribbean islands of Panama appear in red on maps published by the UN's Intergovernmental Panel on Climate Change (IPCC).
  - The government of El Salvador tries to recover three million plastic bottles in a two-day recycling program.
- February 9
  - Municipal elections in Costa Rica: Only 9 of 82 candidates for mayor are women, according to the ‘’Instituto Nacional de las Mujeres’’ (“National Institute of Women”), (INAMU).
  - Legislators and the executive in El Salvador dispute a US$109 million loan earmarked for the police and military.
  - The Chamber of Commerce, Industry and Agriculture of Panama (CCIAP) requests that foreigners be allowed to work in the country in order to promote economic development.
- February 11 – Nicaragua creates four new fuel companies in response to U.S. sanctions against the state-owned Albanisa because of alleged money laundering by members of the Daniel Ortega family.
- February 12 – Lawmakers in Guatemala pass a controversial law giving the president the authority to restrict non-governmental organizations (NGOs) that engage in "disruptive" activities.
- February 13 – A new metro line will go under the Panama Canal to reach western suburbs of Panama City at a cost of US$2.5 billion. It is part of a $4 billion infrastructure project including a bridge over the canal.
- February 14
  - Three police officers are killed in a shootout attempt to free MS-13 leader Alexander Mendoza "El Porky" in El Progreso, Yoro Department, Honduras. Mendoza escaped.
  - Salvadoran President Nayib Bukele surrounds the Legislative Palace in San Salvador with followers, police, and army snipers after God tells him the legislature must approve a $109 million loan from the United States.
- February 15 – Authorities in Costa Rica seize a record five tons of cocaine worth $130 million in the port of Limón.
- February 18 – A campaign to reunite families separated by kidnapping and/or irregular adoption during the Guatemalan Civil War of 1960-96 begins.
- February 24
  - Thelma Aldana, the former chief prosecutor known for fighting corruption, is granted asylum in the United States after being charged with embezzlement in Guatemala.
  - New rules go into effect that make immigration to the United States more difficult.
- February 28 – El Salvador's president vetoes a reconciliation law that he says would allow criminals to get away with crimes against humanity during the Salvadoran Civil War
- February 29 – An appeals court in San Francisco rules against the U.S. government's "stay in Mexico" policy for asylum seekers, although the ruling is stayed until March 2.

=== March ===
- March 6 – The first case of COVID-19 in Central America is reported in Costa Rica. On March 13 the number of confirmed cases in the country had risen to 26.
- March 8 – International Women's Day
- March 9
  - Baron Bliss Day, Belize
  - 1,346,991 cases of dengue fever have been reported in Latin America in the last 13 months. The countries with the highest rates are Nicaragua (2,271 cases per 100,000 inhabitants), Belize (1,021), Honduras (995.5), and El Salvador (375).
- March 13
  - Leaders of Belize, Costa Rica, Guatemala, Honduras, Nicaragua, Panama, and the Dominican Republic signed an agreement for dealing with the coronavirus pandemic. It includes canceling the Costa Rican film festival.
  - The Supreme Court of Honduras overturns a 58-year prison sentence against former first lady Rosa Elena Bonilla and orders a new trial on a charge of embezzling about $600,000 in government money between 2010 and 2014.
- March 14 – Panama repatriates 1,504 Colombian tourists from the cruise ship Monarch. Since the port of Cartagena, Colombia is closed, the people have to fly from Colón, Panama. About 300 people are still waiting to buy tickets.
- March 15 – In a historic first, all Peace Corps volunteers worldwide are withdrawn from their host countries.
- March 16 – Mexican deputy health minister Hugo Lopez-Gatell denies a charge by El Salvador president Nayib Bukele that Mexico let a dozen people with COVID-19 board a plane bound to El Salvador International Airport.
- March 18 – Costa Rica registers its first death from COVID-19.
- March 26 – The United States sends ICE planes previously used to deport undocumented immigrants to evacuate North Americans stranded in Guatemala, Honduras and El Salvador. 64 people were transported from Honduras on March 24.
- March 28 – Panama and Costa Rica fail in attempts to move thousands of migrants from Africa, Asia, and Haiti amassed in shelters as a precaution against COVID-19. Panama has 901 confirmed infections and 17 deaths while Costa Rica has 295 confirmed cases and two deaths.

=== April ===
- April 1 – U.S. President Donald Trump announces that he is stepping up pressure on Venezuelan President Nicolás Maduro. Trump sends anti-drug Navy ships and AWACS planes to the region near Venezuela in the largest military build-up in the region since the 1989 invasion of Panama to remove General Manuel Noriega from power.
- April 3
  - Thousands of Central Americans are jailed for disobeying coronavirus lockdown rules.
  - The National Bolivarian Armed Forces of Venezuela prepare artillery for a possible attack by the United States.
- April 4
  - Belize closes its borders to all, including nationals. Nineteen Belizeans are confined at two facilities in Corozal Town.
  - Nicaraguans ask where President Ortega is; he has not been seen in public since March 12.
- April 5–11: Holy Week
- April 11
  - Juan Santamaría Day, Costa Rica
  - Honduras extends its red alert status for the coronavirus until April 19.
- April 12 – The U.S. Customs and Border Protection says it has used the COVID-19 pandemic as a pretext to expel over 10,000 Mexican and Central American asylum seekers to Mexico.
- April 20 – 1.8 million children return to school and 130,000 government employees return to work in Nicaragua despite fears of COVID-19. Nicaragua has had two deaths and nine reported cases of coronavirus. President Daniel Ortega, who had not been seen for 34 days, said Nicaraguans “haven’t stopped working, because if this country stops working, it dies.”
- April 21 – The United Nations Economic Commission for Latin America and the Caribbean estimates that the coronavirus pandemic may result in a 5.3% in GDP in the region, resulting in a 4.4% increase in poverty and a 2.5% increase in extreme poverty—29 million people.
- April 23
  - The International Monetary Fund (IMF) extends El Salvador a credit of $389 million and demands budget cuts (including a 60% cut in pensions) and tax increases including fuel taxes and value-added tax (VAT).
  - The United Nations Commission on Human Rights calls on Mexican and Central American governments to halt deportations during the coronavirus pandemic. 2,500 migrants are stuck in Panama because Honduras has closed its border. Mexico has dumped migrants in Guatemala, but Guatemala has not let them in. On April 23 the organization helped 41 migrants return to El Salvador from Mexico.
- April 24 – Lee Henley Huxiang, a Belizean national, is going to be prosecuted in China for helping pro-democracy activists in Hong Kong. Belize does not have diplomatic relations with China (People's Republic of China), but recognizes the government of Taiwan (Republic of China) instead.
- April 26
  - Mexico′s National Institute of Migration (INM) empties the 65 migrant detention centers it has across the country by returning 3,653 people to Guatemala, El Salvador, and Honduras in the hope of preventing outbreaks of COVID-19.
  - Over a hundred Nicaraguan citizens are denied entry to Nicaragua as they flee the coronavirus and unemployment in other countries.
- April 27 – After a weekend with a record number of killings, El Salvador President Nayib Bukele authorizes the use of force against criminal gangs. He also cracks down on inmates inside prisons.
- April 28 – Juan Carlos Muñoz, vice-minister of the Presidency of Panama resigns after being accused of corruption.
- April 29
  - Two dozen Colombians deported from the United States have been found to have coronavirus. Other infections among deportees have been found in Haiti, Mexico, Guatemala, and Jamaica.
  - Residents of Felipillo, Panama, block the Pan-American Highway for twelve hours, demanding the “bono solidario” (solidarity bonus) promised by the government in response to the COVID-19 pandemic.
- April 30
  - Juan Carlos Bonilla Valladares (“El Tigre”), former chief of the National Police of Honduras, is charged in New York with drug trafficking conspiracy.
  - The Pan American Health Organization (PAHA) warns of measles outbreaks in Venezuela and Colombia.There have also been outbreaks in Mexico and Brazil.

=== May ===
- May 1 – International Workers' Day and Labour Day
- May 3 – Fiesta de las Cruces (El Salvador)
- May 4 – The European Union sanctions six high-ranking officials of the government of Nicaragua, including the police chief, for human rights violations in April 2018.
- May 17 – Salvadoran President Nayib Bukele′s “containment centers” where thousands of Salvadorans have been detained for more than a month at a time without judicial review, come under criticism from human rights advocates. The government has reported 1,265 cases and 26 deaths from the COVID-19 pandemic nationwide.
- May 12 – The Panama Canal is going dry because of a lack of rain.
- May 18
  - Commonwealth Day, Belize
  - COVID-19 pandemic: Nicaragua closes its borders with Costa Rica as the latter tests truck drivers. Sixty-one drivers test positive and are turned back. Costa Rica has 866 confirmed cases and ten deaths, and some question the veracity of Nicaragua's claim of only 25 cases and eight deaths.
- May 26 – Costa Rica becomes the first country in Central America to legalize same-sex marriage.
- May 28 – Legislative leaders from Costa Rica and Panama meet with their counterparts from eight other Latin American countries to discuss a response to the COVID-19 pandemic.
- May 31 – Tropical Storm Amanda kills seventeen in El Salvador and Guatemala while causing flooding, power outages, destroying 50 homes and sending thousands to shelters.

=== June ===
- June 3
  - COVID-19 pandemic: El Observatorio Ciudadano, an anonymous group of 90 doctors, epidemiologists, and other health providers, says that Nicaragua is following the Swedish model of fighting the pandemic, resulting in 3,275 infections and 805 deaths, as opposed to the official figures of 759 infections and 35 deaths.
  - Migrants from Africa and the Caribbean continue their march north through Honduras despite the fact that the country has closed its borders.
- June 8
  - U.S. Secretary of State Mike Pompeo announces that Gustavo Adolfo Alejos Cámbara, private secretary to former President Álvaro Colom (2008-2012) is ineligible for admission to the United States because of corruption. The ban also applies to Alejos Cámbara's family.
  - Spain’s National Court begins the trial of Inocente Orlando Montano, a former colonel who served as El Salvador’s vice minister for public security during the country’s 1979-1992 civil war and René Yusshy Mendoza, an army lieutenant, for their alleged involvement in the massacre of five Spanish priests in El Salvador in 1989.
- June 11 – The World Health Organization (WHO) reports a decrease in malaria in Latin America, although there are fears that many cases are going undetected as sick people stay home instead of going to hospitals. Honduras, Panama, and Nicaragua report increases, the last by 25%.
- June 17, President Juan Orlando Hernández of Honduras and his wife, Ana García, reported that they had been infected by COVID-19.

=== July ===
- July 8 – Homicides in El Salvador fell over 50% in President Nayib Bukele's first year in office, with officials citing tougher enforcement, while a study by the Brussels-based International Crisis Group (ICG) suggests gangs may have eased up on violence and made informal deals with authorities.
- July 9 – COVID-19 pandemic: Panama reports 41,251 cases, which puts it in first place in Latin America for the number of infections based upon population, ahead of Brazil and Mexico. Panama has 4,316,453 inhabitants for a rate of 104.6 cases per million inhabitants.
- July 12 – Dr. Maria Franca Tallarico, the head of health for the Americas regional office of the International Federation of Red Cross and Red Crescent Societies warns that many Latin American countries have reduced efforts to combat Dengue fever outbreaks.
- July 13 – COVID-19 pandemic: A report by The New York Times and the Marshall Project indicates that U.S. Immigration and Customs Enforcement (ICE) worsened the spread of the pandemic by deporting sick people to their countries of origin, including Guatemala and El Salvador.
- July 18 – El Salvador announces a fumigation program against American grasshoppers.
- July 19 – Revolution Day, Nicaragua
- July 25
  - Guanacaste Day, Costa Rica
  - COVID-19 pandemic: Mexico and Japan send medical supplies to ten Latin American countries, including Salvador, Guatemala, Honduras, Nicaragua, and Panamá.
- July 31 – A fire started by a Molotov cocktail damages a holy image in the Immaculate Conception Cathedral, Managua, Nicaragua.

=== August ===
- August 1 and 10 – St. Dominic de Guzmán, Nicaragua
- August 3 – Panama proposes sending 2,000 Haitian, Cuban, and African migrants home after disturbances in camps.
- August 7 – Dyalá Jiménez Figueres, Costa Rica's Minister of Foreign Trade, resigns.
- August 16 – COVID-19 pandemic in Belize: Attorney General Michael Peyrefitte announces a tightening of restrictions, including a return to a nationwide curfew, as the virus worsens.
- August 17 – COVID-19 pandemic in Panama: Panama reopens hair salons and churches.
- August 27 – Crab Soup Day, Abolition of slavery in Corn Islands, Nicaragua

=== September ===
- September 4 – An earthquake with a 5.5 magnitude strikes Panama and Costa Rica; no reported injuries or damages.
- September 10 – Battle of St. George's Caye Day, Belize
- September 11 – United States invasion of Panama: Remains of victims of the 1989 invasion in Colón are exhumed for identification.
- September 12 – Mauricio Claver-Carone becomes the first citizen of the U.S. to lead the Inter-American Development Bank.
- September 14 – Battle of San Jacinto (1856), Nicaragua
- September 15 Independence Day: Costa Rica, El Salvador, Guatemala, Honduras, and Nicaragua
- September 21 – Independence Day, Belize
- September 30 – St. Jerome's Day, Nicaragua

=== October ===
- October 2 – The Mexican government deploys 26,000 soldiers on its southern border to block a caravan of immigrants originating in Honduras.
- October 3 – Francisco Morazán Day, Honduras
- October 12 – Columbus Day and Indigenous Resistance Day (Nicaragua)
- October 19 – Day of the 1944 Revolution, Guatemala
- October 21 – Armed Forces Day, Honduras

=== November ===
- November 1–2: All Saints Day and Day of the Dead
- November 3 – Separation Day, Panama
- November 4 – Hurricane Eta kills at least 19 and leaves 2,776 homeless in Honduras and Nicaragua.
- November 5 – Colón Day, Panama
- November 11 – 2020 Belizean parliamentary election: : Johnny Briceño of the People's United Party (PUP) leads 19 seats to five.
- November 16
  - Hurricane Iota makes landfall in Nicaragua as a Category 4 hurricane (the then strongest to do so) two weeks after Hurricane Eta.
  - Presidents Alejandro Giammattei and Juan Orlando Hernandez warn that climate change will lead to more migration.
- November 19 – Garifuna Settlement Day, Belize
- November 21 – Our Lady of Peace, El Salvador

=== December ===
- December 8 – Immaculate Conception, Nicaragua
- December 16 – COVID-19 pandemic: Costa Rica and Panama approve the Pfizer-BioNTech COVID-19 vaccine and hope to begin applications in the first trimester of 2021.
- December 17 – Mexican President López Obrador defends his country's restrictive migration policy but says things may change with Joe Biden's election in the US.
- December 19 – During a phone call, Mexican President Lopez Obrador and United States President-elect Joe Biden discuss a new approach to migration issues including why people emigrate from Central America.
- December 22 – Fourteen migrant women being held at the Irwin County Detention Center in Georgia, US, sue for abuse and forced medical procedures, including unnecessary hysterectomies.
- December 25 – Christmas Day, holiday throughout region
- December 26 – Boxing Day, Belize and throughout region
- December 28 – The US cuts military aid to El Salvador, Guatemala, and Honduras as part of an anti-corruption effort.

== Culture ==
=== Music ===
- February 20 – Premio Lo Nuestro 2020 in Miami, Florida

=== Sports ===
- January 9 – Costa Rica will play the United States and Dominica in qualifying rounds for the 2022 FIFA World Cup qualification and that Canada, El Salvador, Haiti, and Honduras will play in Group. B.
- February 7 to 10 – Ultramarathon Xocomil in Lake Atitlán, Sololá Department
- February 22 to March 8 – Campeonato Femenino Sub-20 Concacaf 2020 (Concacaf 2020 Under-20 Women's Championship) in the Dominican Republic
- April 25 – Boxing returns to Nicaragua as the country reopens after reporting three deaths and eleven cases of COVID-19. Baseball and soccer games are also being played.
- May 9 to 17 – 2020 ISA World Surfing Games in El Salvador (event postponed until 8–16 May 2021)

== Deaths ==
- January 2 – Ricardo Rosales Román, 85, Guatemalan politician (Guatemalan Party of Labour) and guerrilla (Guatemalan National Revolutionary Unity) (b. 1934)
- January 5 – David Albin Zywiec Sidor, 72, American-Nicaraguan Roman Catholic prelate, Bishop of Siuna (since 2017), brain tumor (b. July 15, 1947)
- February 20 – José Benito López Méndez, 51, leader of Ciudadanos por la Libertad ("Citizens for Liberty," an opposition political party) in Mulukuku, Nicaragua; kidnapped and shot
- March 1 – Ernesto Cardenal, 95, Nicaraguan poet and priest; health complications (b. January 20, 1925)
- April 4 – Rafael Leonardo Callejas Romero, 76, Honduran politician, President (1990–1994); cardiac arrest
- April 15 – Dorick M. Wright, 74, Belizean Roman Catholic prelate, Bishop of Belize City-Belmopan (2006–2017).
- May 19 – Carlos Jirón, 65, Nicaraguan politician, member of the National Assembly; complications from diabetes
- May 25 – Otto de la Rocha, 86, Nicaraguan singer, songwriter and actor.
- June 14 – Haroldo Rodas, 74, Guatemalan diplomat and politician, Minister of Foreign Affairs (2008–2012); COVID-19.
- June 16 – Edén Pastora ("Commander Zero"), 83, Nicaraguan revolutionary leader and 2006 presidential candidate (Alternative for Change
- June 23 – César Bosco Vivas Robelo, 78, Nicaraguan Roman Catholic prelate, Bishop of León (1991–2019).
- July 9 – Irma Lanzas, 86, Salvadoran writer and educator.
- July 18 – David Romero Ellner, 65, Honduran journalist and politician (Movimiento de Izquierda Revolucionaria, MRI); COVID-19.
- August 2 – Bobby Prescott, 89, Panamanian baseball player (Kansas City Athletics).
- September 9 – Henrietta Boggs, 102, American-Costa Rican writer and socialite, First Lady (1948–1949), subject of First Lady of the Revolution.

== See also ==
- 2020 in the Caribbean
- 2020 in Mexico
- COVID-19 pandemic in North America
- 2020 in politics and government
- 2020s
- 2020s in political history
- Central American Parliament
- List of George Floyd protests outside the United States
- List of state leaders in Central America in 2020
- 2020 Atlantic hurricane season
