= Shooting of Henry Jemmott =

2021 fatal shooting of Belizean police officer

- Location: 17°55′17″N 87°57′40″W; San Pedro Town
- Date: 28 May 2021
- Weapon: Glock 17 Pistol
- Victim: Henry Jemmott
- Perpetrator: Jasmine Hartin
- Motive: Accidental
- Charges: Manslaughter
- Verdict: Guilty

On May 28, 2021, Jasmine Hartin, partner of a Belize hotelier, Andrew Ashcroft (son of Lord Michael Ashcroft), accidentally fatally shot Belizean police superintendent Henry Jemmott with his own pistol while socialising with him in San Pedro Town. She pled guilty to manslaughter in April 2023, before being fined and ordered to undertake community service.

== Jasmine Hartin ==
Hartin was born in 1988 in Kingston, Ontario to mother Candice Castiglione. Hartin was in a common-law marriage with hotelier Andrew Ashcroft, the son of former British Conservative Party deputy chair Michael Ashcroft. She worked in real estate before being employed by her husband's hotel.

After the shooting, the couple separated. Andrew took custody of the couple's two children in 2022, prompting a custody battle between them.

== Shooting ==
On May 28, 2021, Hartin accidentally shot Belizean police superintendent Henry Jemmott. The shooting occurred on a pier in San Pedro Town. After fatally shooting Jemmott with his own pistol, Hartin was arrested on May 31 and charged with manslaughter. Initially denied bail and held in Belize Central Prison, she was later released on 30,000 Belize dollars of bail.

== Aftermath ==
Hartin discussed the shooting on the television program 48 Hours, stating that she went for a late night walk and drink of whisky with Jemmott, who was a long time friend, before accidentally shooting him while he was showing her his Glock 17 pistol. In an interview with The Times and another with Piers Morgan on TalkTV, Hartin denied any romantic connection to Jemmott, and stated that he was giving her a gun lesson. In June 2022, Hartin made a plea to Canadian Prime Minister Justin Trudeau for assistance to leave Belize. Henry Jemmott's family accused Hartin of operating an "international PR campaign" in the aftermath of his homicide.

On April 26, 2023, Hartin pled guilty to manslaughter, and judge Ricardo Sandcroft sentenced her to 300 hours of community service and a BZ$75,000 fine. The court confiscated Hartin's passport. After Hartin paid the fine, officials refused to return Hartin's passport; she had to obtain temporary travel documents from the Canadian embassy.

On June 6, 2023, Hartin was detained overnight at the Belize–Mexico border, amid allegations that she was trying to leave Belize without paying her fine. She was released the next day, after police commissioner Chester Williams confirmed that she had broken no laws and had met her obligations to pay the fine.
