= Días Patrios (Guatemala) =

National holidays celebrated in Guatemala

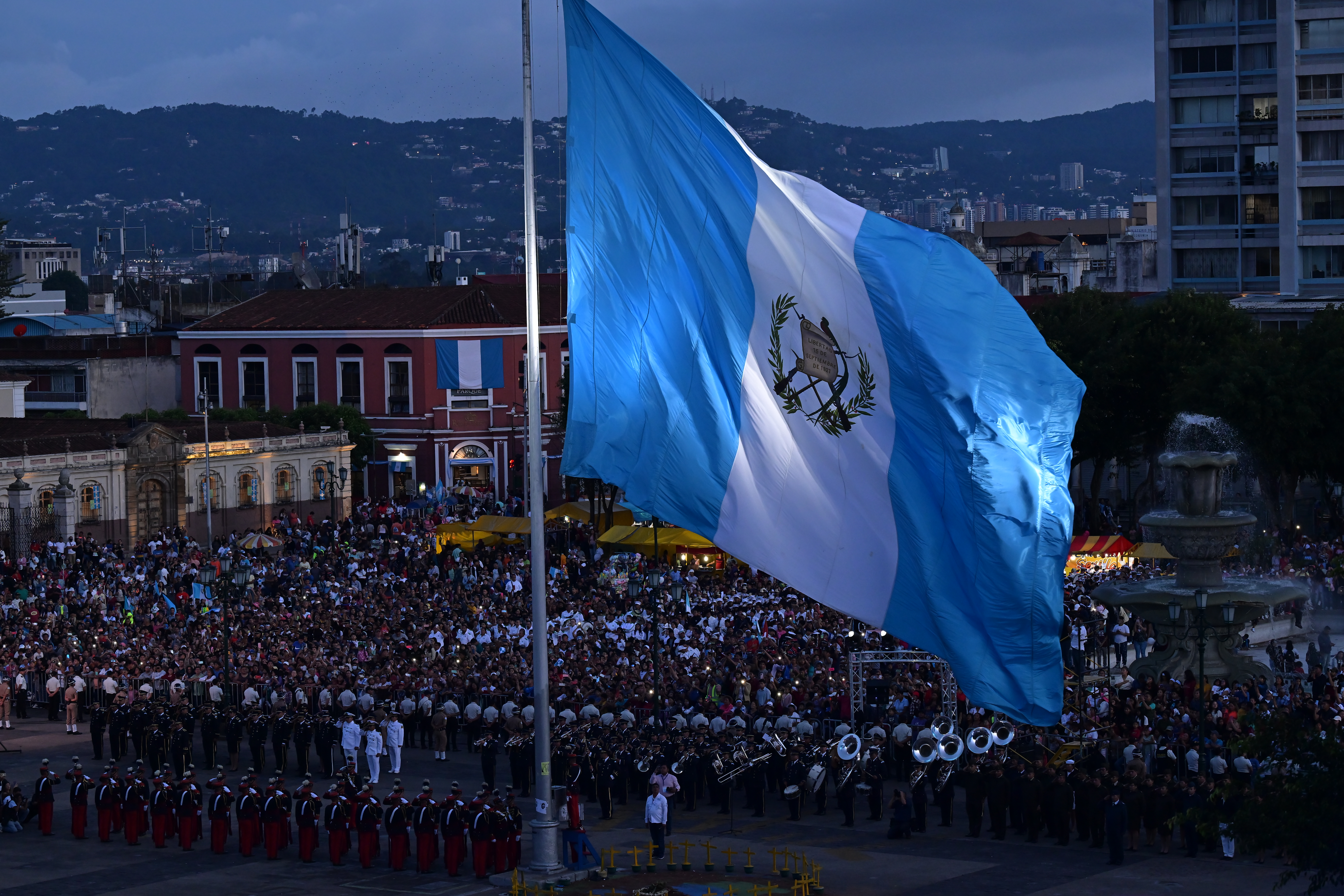
- Members of the Armed Forces raising the flag of Guatemala at the National Palace to commemorate the 202nd anniversary of Independence.
- Official name: Días Patrios
- Also called: Patriotic Days
- Frequency: Annual

The Días Patrios, or Patriotic Days, are national holidays celebrated in Guatemala commemorating its declaration of independence on 15 September 1821 with the former United Provinces of Central America, later reorganized / renamed the Federal Republic of Central America, (up to 1847, then seceding with a second declaration of independence, becoming the current Republic of Guatemala), from the rule of the monarchs of the Royal House of Bourbon in the Kingdom of Spain, far to the east across the Atlantic Ocean on the continent of Europe (in the Eastern Hemisphere) and its then worldwide Spanish Empire and the regional Viceroyalty of New Spain in Central America and the western continents of the Americas (Western Hemisphere). These include:

- September 15: Independence Day
- October 20: Day of the Guatemalan Revolution of 1944
