= Michelle Arana =

Belizean judge

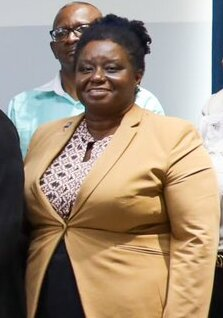
Arana in 2022

Michelle Agnes Arana OBE (born 1969) is a Belizean judge who served as acting Chief Justice of Belize from 7 April 2020 to 2 September 2022. She was appointed the first female justice of the Supreme Court of Belize in 2006.

== Early life ==
Michelle Agnes Arana was born in 1969 in Belize City. She completed a bachelor's degree in English at Ball State University, then went on to study at the Norman Manley Law School of the University of the West Indies, finishing in 1994. She earned an LLM degree in Commercial Law from Birmingham University in 2004, and was named the University of Birmingham's Alumna of the Year in 2006.

== Career ==
In 2006 Michelle Arana was appointed to be a justice of the Supreme Court of Belize. She was the court's first female justice. Before her appointment as a justice, Arana was Registrar General and Registrar of the Supreme Court and the Court of Appeal of Belize. In 1998 she was appointed to serve on Belize's National Women's Commission.

After Kenneth Benjamin retired as Chief Justice of Belize in March 2020, Arana was named acting Chief Justice. She was officially sworn in on 7 April. She served until Louise Blenman was sworn in as the new Chief Justice on 2 September 2022, then transferred to the Court of Appeal.

Arana was made an Officer of the Order of the British Empire in the 2022 New Year Honours for services to the field of law and public service.

Legal offices
Preceded by Kenneth Benjamin	Chief Justice of Belize (acting); 2020-2022	Succeeded by Louise Blenman
