= COVID-19 pandemic in Belize =

Ongoing COVID-19 viral pandemic in Belize

- Disease: COVID-19
- Pathogen: SARS-CoV-2
- Location: Belize
- First outbreak: Wuhan, China
- Index case: San Pedro Town
- Arrival date: 23 March 2020
- Confirmed cases: 71,499
- Recovered: 14,262
- Deaths: 688
- Vaccinations: 258,473 (total vaccinated); 221,478 (fully vaccinated); 511,106 (doses administered)

Government website
- Government of Belize; Coronavirus cases in Belize

The COVID-19 pandemic in Belize is part of the ongoing worldwide pandemic of coronavirus disease 2019 (COVID-19) caused by severe acute respiratory syndrome coronavirus 2 (SARS-CoV-2). The virus was confirmed to have reached Belize on 23 March 2020.

== Background ==
On 12 January 2020, the World Health Organization (WHO) confirmed that a novel coronavirus was the cause of a respiratory illness in a cluster of people in Wuhan City, Hubei Province, China, which was reported to the WHO on 31 December 2019.

The case fatality ratio for COVID-19 has been much lower than SARS of 2003, but the transmission has been significantly greater, with a significant total death toll.

Belize has postponed its census to 2021 in order to divert census funding for national emergency funding.

== Timeline ==
Cases

Deaths

=== March 2020 ===
The country's first case was announced on 23 March, a Belizean woman who returned to San Pedro Town from Los Angeles, California. The second case was announced on 25 March. They had immediate contact with the first case.

The third case in Belize was announced on 29 March from a traveler returning from New York City to Belize City.

=== April 2020 ===
On 5 April, the Queen of Belize addressed the Commonwealth in a televised broadcast, in which she asked people to "take comfort that while we may have more still to endure, better days will return". She added, "we will be with our friends again; we will be with our families again; we will meet again".

The 5th confirmed case of coronavirus was confirmed in a Belizean student who returned from Florida in the United States. At the time he was reported to be in self-isolation at a quarantine facility and had no symptoms. By 13 April, the last of 18 initial domestic cases of the COVID-19 was reported in Belize. Of these, 2 people died (on 4 April and 10 April).

=== May 2020 ===
The last of the remaining 16 reported cases had recovered by 5 May.

=== June 2020 ===
On 5 June, a new case was reported. It was a male Belizean National who came home on a cruise ship with other fellow Belizeans. He was already under quarantine when the case was reported.

On 6 June or 7 June, a 22-year-old infected but asymptomatic female was caught entering the country illegally and was placed into the mandatory quarantine facility in Punta Gorda, along with her 2 travelling companions who were not infected.

On 19 June, a young asymptomatic female Belizean returning to Belize from Texas on a repatriation flight was found to be infected upon testing at her arrival and was sent to immediate quarantine as per the established protocol. She has been identified only as Patient 23.

=== July 2020 ===
As of 14 July, there have been a total of 39 cases of COVID-19 cases, with 16 active cases and the majority (9) are from Orange Walk District, with 7 being from Blue Creek Village and 2 are repatriated persons, the remainder are repatriated cases, majority in Belize City (6) and new active case in San Ignacio and Santa Elena Town with unknown origins. Contact tracing has begun with the infected individual.

The villages of Blue Creek and San Felipe have gone into a month lock-down due to the cluster from Blue Creek.

As of Tuesday 21 July 2022 there are a total of 43 confirmed cases, 18 of those are active, 85 have recovered and the death count remains at 2.

As of 24 July, there are a total of 48 confirmed cases, with the death count remaining at 2, and no known community spread.

=== August 2020 ===
Belize has announced a phased re-opening for international tourism with a resumption of some international flights for tourists starting on 15 August 2020. All travelers are required to be tested for the coronavirus. The initial re-opening calls for a limited number of hotels and additional restrictions within the country. On 5 August 2020, an additional 14 cases were confirmed in San Pedro, Ambergris Caye. Bringing the total confirmed COVID-19 cases to 86. On 6 August 2020, an additional 28 cases were confirmed, 20 cases linked in San Pedro, 1 case from San Ignacio, 1 case from Belmopan, 2 cases from Santa Martha, 1 case from Orange Walk Town and 3 cases in Belize City. There is a total of 80 active cases.

As of 10 August 2020, they are a total of 177 confirmed cases, 86 females and 91 males. Out of the 177 cases, 143 are active, 32 have recovered and the deaths remain at 2.

As of 11 August 2020, 33 new cases were confirmed, increasing the total of confirmed cases to 210, 96 females and 114 males. Out of the 210 cases, 176 are active, 32 have recovered and the deaths remain at 2.

As of 12 August 2020, 86 new cases were confirmed, increasing the total of confirmed cases to 296, 122 females and 174 males. Out of the 296 cases, 262 are active cases, 32 recovered and the deaths remain at 2.

=== September 2020 ===
Increasing numbers of active cases until 10 September (1021 active cases), then decline to 634 at 28 September. After this, numbers of active cases started to increase again with 692 active cases end of September.

=== October 2020 ===
1 October: The Belize airport reopened for international travel.

11 October: 2496 confirmed cases, 1531 recovered, 905 active cases, 36 deaths.

The majority of cases is in the northern half of the country with 471 confirmed cases so far in Orange Walk district. According to residents the virus may have spread from people border jumping to Mexico / Chetumal, and through bars and a market in Orange Walk, where people buy illegally imported beers, toilet paper, detergents, pampers and other items. Many of the cases in San Pedro (with about 322 total and 62 active cases reported on 5 October) may have originated through this avenue as well.

=== November 2020 ===
2 November reported that 25 new cases of COVID-19 confirmed on 1 November. Reported that 2,200 people recovered.

Belize authorities issued restriction for travelers from England for 5 November – 2 December 2020.

=== December 2020 ===
In early December, Dr. Marvin Manzanero, the Director of Health Services in Belize, said that he tested positive for COVID-19 and had experienced minor symptoms in his throat; while Prime Minister John Briceño returned to work, saying he had recovered from his bout with the virus.

=== May 2021 ===
Marcelo Ebrard Mexican Foreign Minister, announced on May 12 that Mexico will donate 400,000 doses of Oxford–AstraZeneca COVID-19 vaccine to Belize, Bolivia, and Paraguay.

== Prevention measures ==
In the light of the announcement of the first two cases of COVID-19 in Belize, Prime Minister Dean Barrow declared a State of Emergency for San Pedro on 25 March 2020. Residents of Ambergris Caye were placed under mandatory quarantine. Onlу еssеntiаl wоrkеrs were аllоwеd to trаvеrsе the strееts. "Unаuthоrizеd vеssеls will be bаnnеd frоm lеаving оr аrriving on the islаnd," а ѕtаtеmеnt frоm the Gоvеrnmеnt sаid. At the time the Ministry of Health announced it was tracing everyone that may have been in contact with the Belizean woman who tested positive for the COVID-19.

Prime Minister Dean Barrow also closed schools on March 20 with tentative resumption on April 20, pending any changes in the situation. He banned public gathering of more than 25 people and he imposed border restrictions. All flights were grounded effective March 23. Only cargo would be able to cross the borders and docked by sea. Belizeans were still allowed to return to Belize but residents would not be allowed to leave the country unless it is an emergency.

The Minister of health asked that anyone having flu-like symptoms stay home, self-isolate, and call the hotline at 0-800-MOH-CARE for further guidance.

On March 30, a state of emergency was announced across the country, as well as a curfew from 8 p.m. to 5 a.m. from April 1 to April 30.

Initially, Foreigners who had traveled to European countries, Hong Kong, China, Iran, Japan, South Korea in the past 30 days were not allowed to enter. Belize closed its ports of entry except for the Santa Elena Border and Philip Goldson International Airport which remained open according to Belize's Ministry of Health. Cargo vessels were allowed to use all ports of entry.

In early April, the government announced that borders would be closed to all travellers, including Belizean nationals except for emergency situations.

The last of 18 initial domestic cases of the COVID-19 was reported in Belize on April 13. Of these, 2 people died (on April 4 and April 10) and the last of the remaining 12 were reported recovered by May 5. Through a series of statutory instruments #41 (March 26) to #65 & 66 (May 4), the state of emergency was modified a number of times and restrictions began to be eased.

People traveling to Belize are required to download the Belize Health App. COVID-19 testing is available at the Belize airport for US$50. If tested positive for COVID-19, the traveler must quarantine for 14 days in hotel or an approved quarantine hotel.

== Vaccination ==
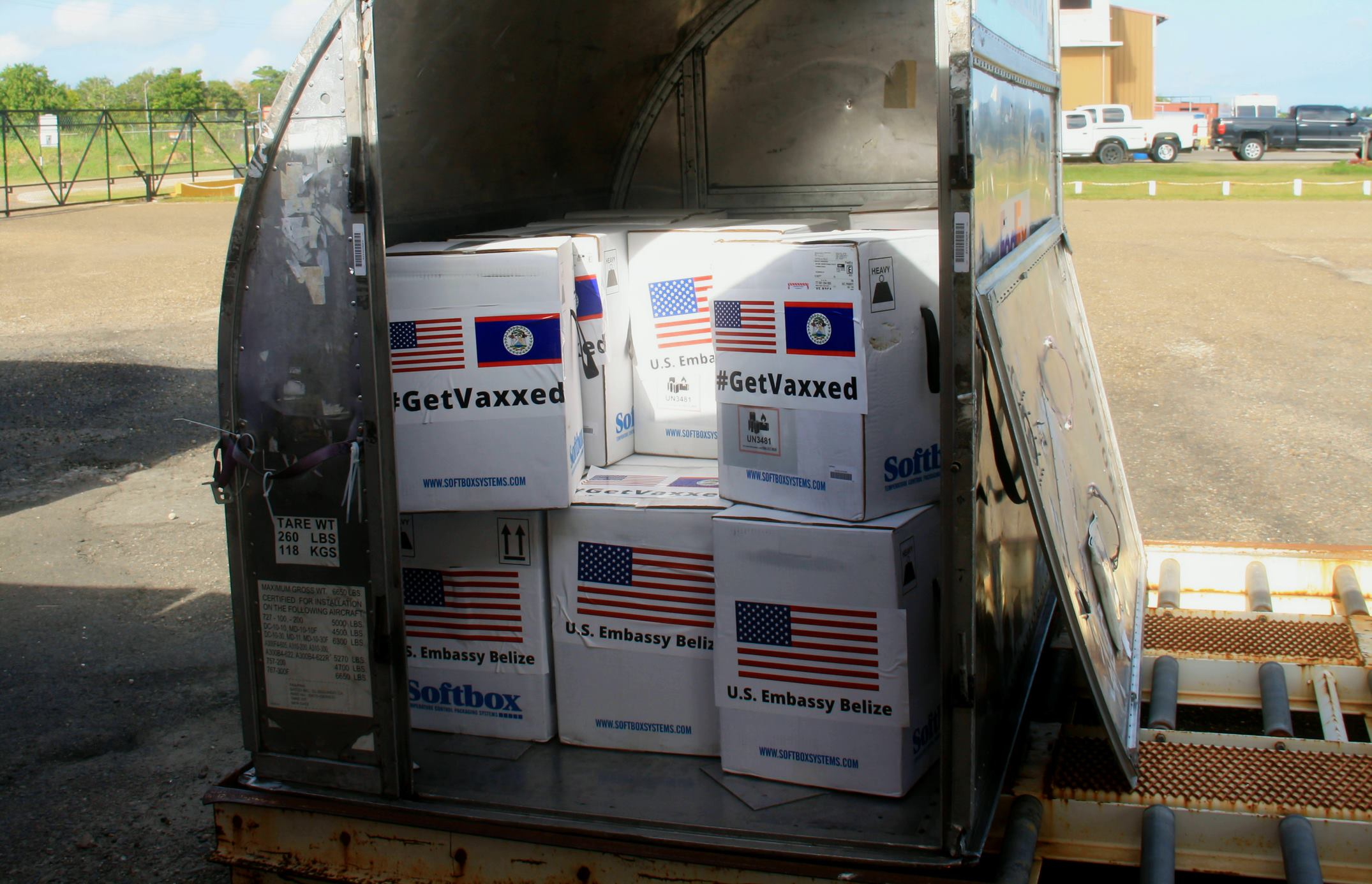
The US delivers Pfizer vaccines as part of the COVAX program in 2021

Belize vaccination plan is in five phases: (1) healthcare workers, elderly 60 years +, persons with diverse abilities, National Assembly members and the Judiciary, (2) police, customs officers, immigration officers, tourism workers, teachers, transport worker, prison guards, (3) Belize Defense Force, coast guard, firemen, utility workers, (4) all other public officers, (5) all remaining adults.

Although Belize started its vaccination campaign only six weeks after the first vaccine has been administered in Central America, Belize is fourth in the race for COVID-19 vaccination in the region. By early June 2021, Belize has administered 18.04 doses of COVID-19 vaccine per 100 people, which equals a total of 73,040 doses. Indeed, 67,000 of the 100,800 doses of the AstraZeneca/Oxford vaccine that have been allocated to Belize through COVAX mechanism, a worldwide initiative that aims at equitable access to COVID-19 vaccine, have already arrived by early May 2021. Moreover, Belize has received a donation of 10,000 doses of the Sinopharm BIBP vaccine form the United Arab Emirates.

Belize offers 4 vaccines: Pfizer/Biontech, Johnson & Johnson, Oxford/Astra Zeneca, and Sinopharm.

== See also ==
- Caribbean Public Health Agency
- 2020 in Central America
- History of smallpox in Mexico
- HIV/AIDS in Latin America
- 2013–2014 chikungunya outbreak
- 2009 swine flu pandemic
- 2019–2020 dengue fever epidemic
- COVID-19 pandemic in North America
- COVID-19 recession in Belize
