= Monarchy of Belize =

King of Belize
- Coat of arms of Belize

Incumbent
- Charles III since 8 September 2022

Details
- Style: His Majesty
- Heir apparent: William, Prince of Wales
- First monarch: Elizabeth II
- Formed: 21 September 1981

The monarchy of Belize is a system of government in which a hereditary monarch is the sovereign and head of state of Belize. The current Belizean monarch and head of state, since 8 September 2022, is King Charles III. As sovereign, he is the personal embodiment of the Belizean Crown. Although the person of the sovereign is shared with 14 other independent countries within the Commonwealth of Nations, each country's monarchy is separate and legally distinct. As a result, the current monarch is officially titled King of Belize and, in this capacity, he and other members of the royal family undertake public and private functions as representatives of the Belizean state. However, the King is the only member of the royal family with any constitutional role.

All executive authority is vested in the monarch, and royal assent is required for the National Assembly to enact laws and for letters patent and Orders in Council to have legal effect. Most of the powers are exercised by the elected members of parliament, government ministers, and judges. Other powers vested in the monarch are significant but are treated only as reserve powers and as an important security part of the role of the monarchy.

The Crown today primarily functions as a guarantor of continuous and stable governance and a nonpartisan safeguard against the abuse of power. While some powers are exercisable only by the sovereign, most of the monarch's operational and ceremonial duties are exercised by his representative, the governor-general of Belize.

== Origins ==
Her Majesty The Queen played an important role in the existence of Belize. Had we not been under her realm, we would not be Belize. We would have been swallowed by another nation.

— Former Government Minister Hector Silva, 2022

In 1836, after the emancipation of Central America from Spanish rule, the British claimed the right to administer the region nowadays known as Belize. In 1862, the Settlement of Belize in the Bay of Honduras was declared a British colony called British Honduras, and the crown's representative was elevated to a lieutenant governor, subordinate to the governor of Jamaica.

Under a new constitution, the United Kingdom granted British Honduras self-governance in 1964. On 1 June 1973, British Honduras was officially renamed Belize. Independence from the United Kingdom was granted on 21 September 1981, following the signing of the Belize Independence Order in 1981 by Queen Elizabeth II, which made Belize a sovereign state and an independent constitutional monarchy.

Prince Michael of Kent represented the Queen at the independence celebrations. In the capital, Belmopan, in the morning of 21 September, Prince Michael handed the instruments of independence to George Price, who became the prime minister of the newly independent country. Elmira Minita Gordon, a sociologist, was appointed governor-general of Belize by the Queen the same day, who upon assuming office became the first female governor-general in Commonwealth history.

== The Belizean Crown and its aspects ==
Your Majesty, the people of Belize welcome you into our hearts and our homes, our land is your land, our homes are your homes. Together we are the historical ideals of the Belizean experience, which make this land of the free by the Carib sea, truly a tranquil haven of democracy.

— Prime Minister Manuel Esquivel, addressing Queen Elizabeth II of Belize, 1985

The sovereign of Belize is shared with 14 other Commonwealth realms, members of the Commonwealth of Nations that share the same person as sovereign. However, the monarch's relationship with Belize is completely independent from his position as monarch of any other realm. Despite sharing the same person as their respective national monarch, each of the Commonwealth realms is sovereign and independent of the others.

Since independence in 1981, the Belizean Crown has had both a shared and a separate character and the sovereign's role as monarch of Belize is distinct to their position as monarch of any other realm, including the United Kingdom. Only Belizean ministers can advise the sovereign on matters of the Belizean state. The monarchy thus ceased to be an exclusively British institution and in Belize became a Belizean, or "domesticated" establishment.

This division is illustrated in a number of ways: The sovereign, for example, holds a unique Belizean title and, when he is acting in public specifically as a representative of Belize, he uses, where possible, Belizean symbols, including the country's national flag and the like.

The flag of the governor-general of Belize, featuring St Edward's Crown in the centre, and a crowned lion on top.

In Belize, the legal personality of the state is referred to as the "Crown in Right of Belize", or "His Majesty in right of His Government in Belize", or the "Crown in right of His Majesty's Government in Belize".

=== Title ===
In Belize, the King's official title is: Charles the Third, by the Grace of God, King of Belize and of His Other Realms and Territories, Head of the Commonwealth.

This style communicates Belize's status as an independent monarchy, highlighting the sovereign's role specifically as Sovereign of Belize, as well as the shared aspect of the Crown throughout the Commonwealth realms. Typically, the sovereign is styled "King of Belize", and is addressed as such when in Belize.

=== Succession ===
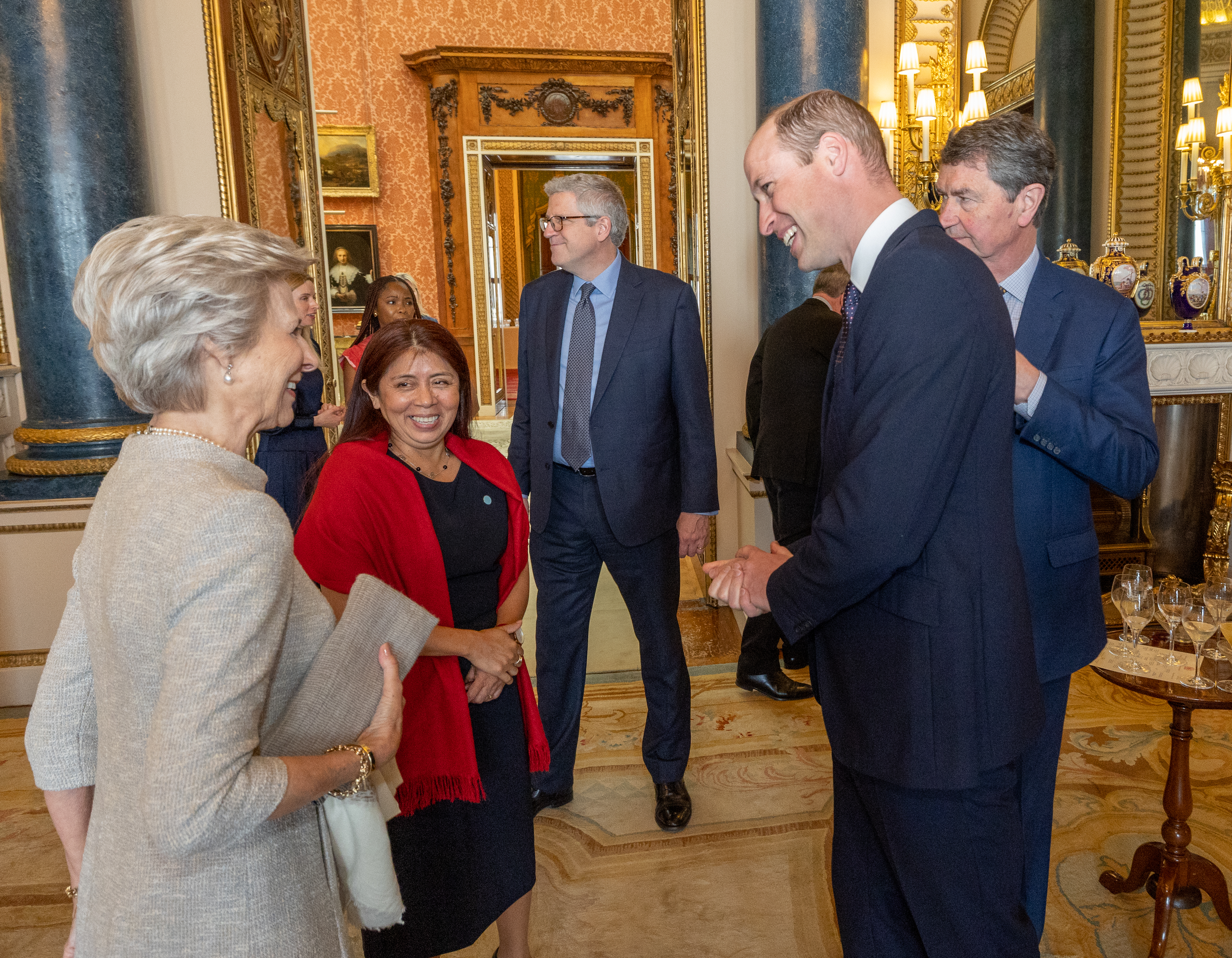
William, Prince of Wales, the current heir apparent to the Belizean throne, with Governor-General Dame Froyla Tzalam, 2023

Like some realms, Belize defers to United Kingdom law to determine the line of succession.

Succession is by absolute primogeniture governed by the provisions of the Succession to the Crown Act 2013, as well as the Act of Settlement 1701, and the Bill of Rights 1689. This legislation limits the succession to the natural (i.e. non-adopted), legitimate descendants of Sophia, Electress of Hanover, and stipulates that the monarch cannot be a Roman Catholic, and must be in communion with the Church of England upon ascending the throne. Though these constitutional laws, as they apply to Belize, still lie within the control of the British parliament, both the United Kingdom and Belize cannot change the rules of succession without the unanimous consent of the other realms, unless explicitly leaving the shared monarchy relationship; a situation that applies identically in all the other realms, and which has been likened to a treaty amongst these countries.

External videos
- Commemoration Service held in honour of HM Queen Elizabeth II; Source: Love FM.

Upon a demise of the Crown (the death or abdication of a sovereign), it is customary for the accession of the new monarch to be proclaimed by the governor-general in the capital, Belmopan, after the accession. Regardless of any proclamations, the late sovereign's heir immediately and automatically succeeds, without any need for confirmation or further ceremony. An appropriate period of mourning also follows, during which flags across the country are flown at half-mast to honour the late monarch. The day of the funeral is likely to be a public holiday. A memorial service commemorating the late monarch is likely to be held at St. John's Cathedral, Belize City.

== Constitutional role and royal prerogative ==
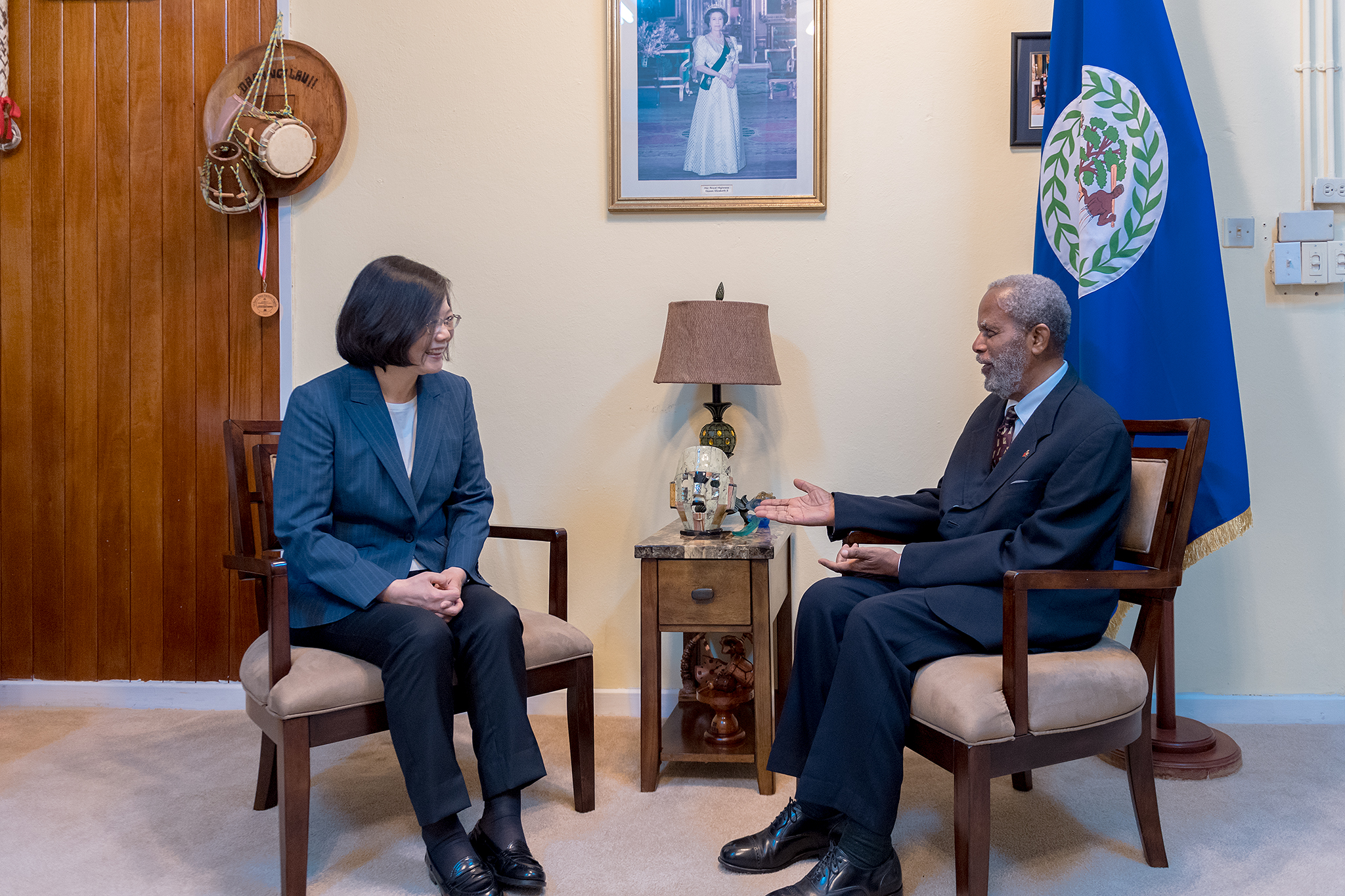
Governor-General Sir Colville Young and President Tsai Ing-wen of Taiwan converse under a portrait of Queen Elizabeth II, 2018

The Belizean Constitution gives Belize a similar parliamentary system of government as the other Commonwealth realms, in which all powers of the state are constitutionally reposed in the monarch, who is represented by the governor-general of Belize; appointed by the monarch upon the advice of the prime minister of Belize. The monarch's domestic duties are performed by this vice-regal representative.

The role of the monarch and the governor-general is both legal and practical; the Crown is regarded as a corporation, in which several parts share the authority of the whole, with the monarch as the person at the centre of the constitutional construct.

=== Executive ===
The governor-general is responsible for appointing a prime minister, who thereafter heads the Cabinet and advises the monarch or governor-general on how to execute their executive powers over all aspects of government operations and foreign affairs. The monarch is informed by the governor-general of the acceptance of the resignation of a prime minister and the swearing-in of a new prime minister and members of the ministry.

The governor-general also appoints and dismisses ministers, members of various executive agencies, and other officials.

There are also a few duties which must be specifically performed by the monarch, such as signing the appointment papers of governors-general.

As all executive authority of Belize is vested in the sovereign, the institutions of government are said to act under his authority; hence, the government of Belize is formally referred to as "His Majesty's Government in Belize".

=== Foreign affairs ===
U.S. Ambassador to Belize Michelle Kwan presenting her credentials to Governor-General Dame Froyla Tzalam, 2022

The Royal Prerogative also extends to foreign affairs: the sovereign or the governor-general may negotiate and ratify treaties, alliances, and international agreements; no parliamentary approval is required. However, a treaty cannot alter the domestic laws of Belize; an Act of Parliament is necessary in such cases. The governor-general, on behalf of the monarch, also accredits Belizean High Commissioners and ambassadors, and receives diplomats from foreign states.

In addition, the issuance of passports falls under the Royal Prerogative and, as such, all Belizean passports are issued in the governor-general's name, the monarch's vice-regal representative.

=== National Assembly ===
The governor-general is responsible for summoning the two Houses of the National Assembly: the Senate and the House of Representatives, and may at any time prorogue or dissolve the National Assembly. At the opening of a new parliamentary session, the governor-general reads the Speech from the Throne, outlining the government's legislative agenda. A general election follows dissolution, the writs for which are issued by the governor-general at Belize House.

Your presence in this Honourable House of Representatives intensifies our faith in the principles of constitutional democracy, which are the pillars of Your Majesty's Government in Belize, and which guide the deliberations of this National Assembly.

— Bernard Q. Pitts, Speaker of the House of Representatives addressing the Queen of Belize, 1994

Further, the constitution outlines that the governor-general alone is responsible for appointing senators. The viceroy must make five senatorial appointments on the advice of the prime minister, one after consulting the Belize Advisory Council, and two on the advice of the leader of the opposition, or if the position is vacant, then in accordance with the advice of person(s) selected by the governor-general in his own deliberate judgment.

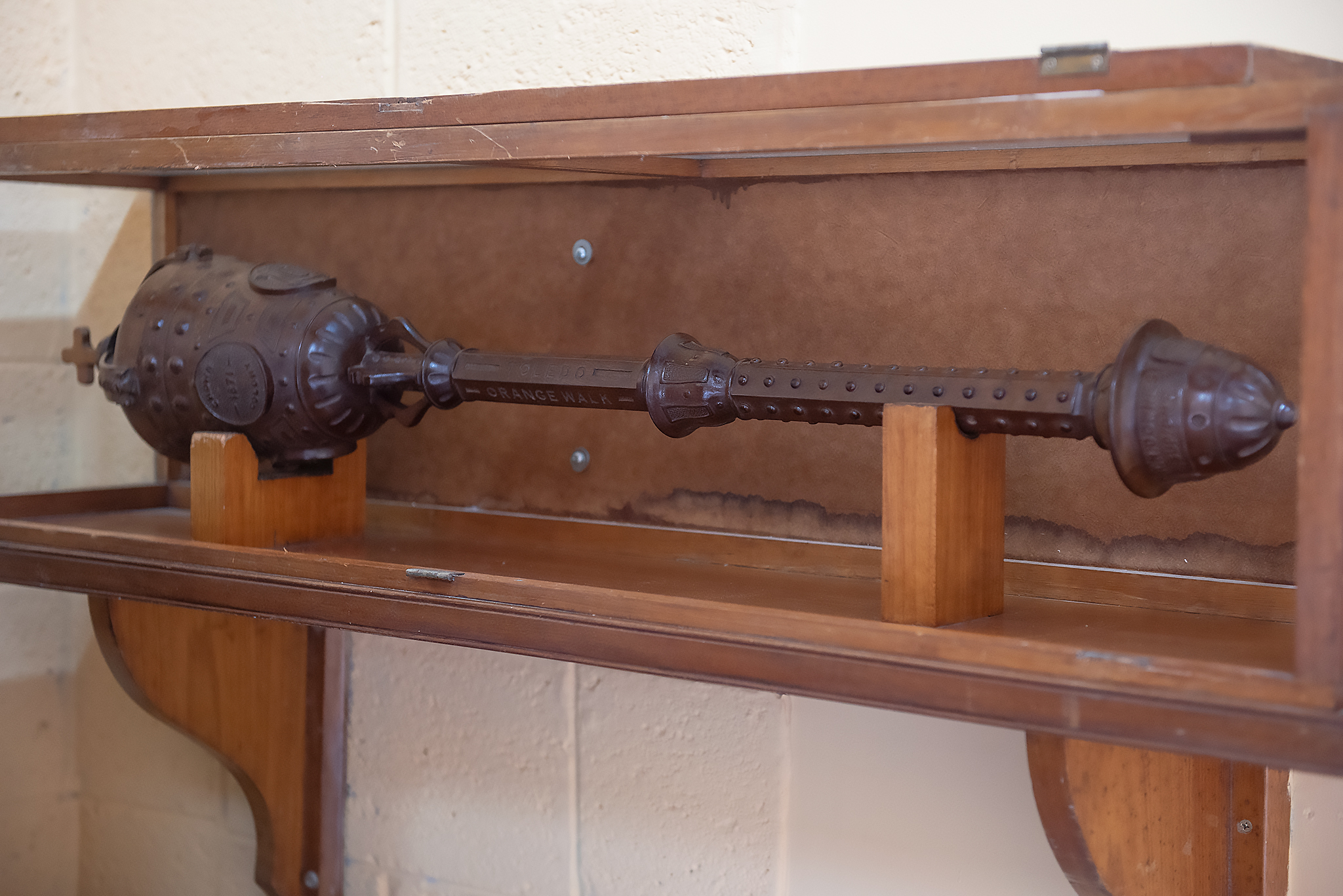
Mace of the National Assembly of Belize

All laws in Belize are enacted with the viceroy's signature. The granting of a signature to a bill is known as Royal Assent; it, and proclamation, are required for all acts of parliament, usually granted or withheld by the governor-general, with the Public Seal of Belize.

The authority of the Crown is embodied in the mace of the House of Representatives, which bears a crown at its apex; unlike other bicameral realms, however, the Belizean legislature only has a mace for the lower house.

Because the Belizean monarchy is a constitutional one, the powers that are constitutionally the monarch's are exercised almost wholly upon the advice of her prime minister and the ministers of the Crown in Cabinet, who are, in turn, accountable to the democratically elected House of Representatives, and through it, to the people. The monarch's role, and thereby the viceroy's role, is almost entirely symbolic and cultural, acting as a symbol of the legal authority under which all governments and agencies operate. In exceptional circumstances, however, the monarch or viceroy can act against such advice based upon their reserve powers.

=== Courts ===
The sovereign is responsible for rendering justice to all his subjects, and is thus traditionally deemed the fount of justice. In Belize, criminal offences are legally deemed to be offences against the sovereign and proceedings for indictable offences are brought in the sovereign's name in the form of The King [or Queen] versus [Name]. Hence, the common law holds that the sovereign "can do no wrong", and the monarch cannot be prosecuted in their own courts for criminal offences.

As your Sovereign, I am proud to associate myself with your determination that social justice and personal freedom should flourish under the rule of law.

— Elizabeth II of Belize, 1994

The appointment of the chief justice of Belize, and other justices of the Supreme Court also falls under the Royal Prerogative, and these duties are assigned to the governor-general by the Constitution.

The governor-general can also grant immunity from prosecution, exercise the "prerogative of mercy", and pardon offences against the Crown. Pardons may be awarded before, during, or after a trial. The exercise of the 'Prerogative of Mercy' to grant a pardon and the commutation of prison sentences in described in section 52 of the Belizean Constitution.

== Cultural role ==
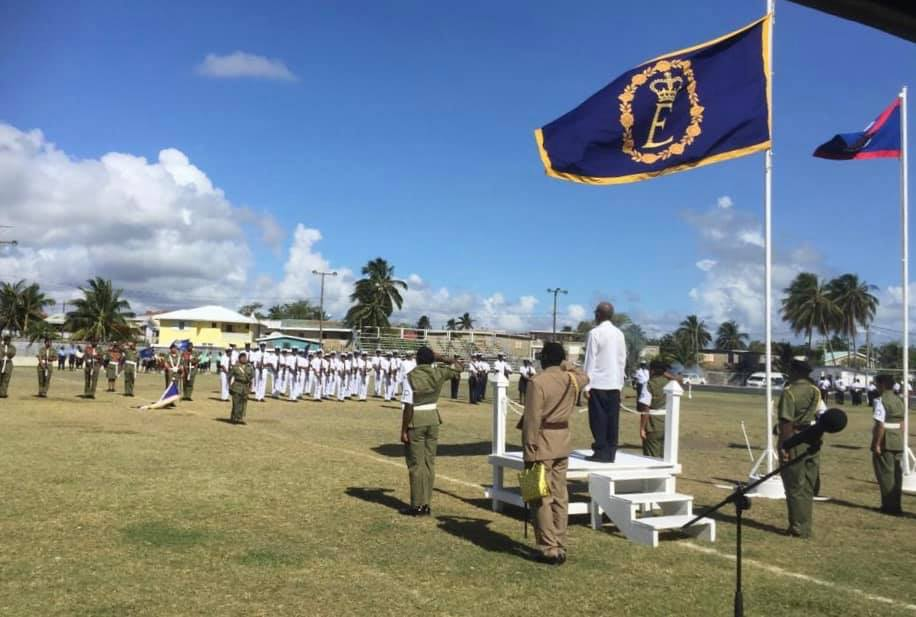
Queen Elizabeth II's personal flag flying at the Sovereign's Day parade in Belize City, 2019

Belize celebrates the birthday of its monarch every year in May. The day is known as Sovereign's Day, and is marked by parades in Belize City, although it is not an official public holiday, like in the UK. Horse races, conducted by the National Sports Council, are held in Belize City's National Stadium and Orange Walk Town's People's Stadium. A cycling race, also arranged by the National Sports Council, is held between the cities of Belmopan and Cayo. There is a flag-raising ceremony among other events held at schools and universities to commemorate Sovereign's Day.

=== The Crown and Honours ===
Within the Commonwealth realms, the monarch is deemed the fount of honour. Similarly, the monarch, as Sovereign of Belize, confers awards and honours in Belize in his name. Most of them are often awarded on the advice of "His Majesty's Belize Ministers". Investitures are conducted by the governor-general on behalf of the sovereign.

Through the passage of the National Honours and Awards Act, Belize established three national orders on 16 August 1991: the Order of Belize, the Order of Distinction, and the Order of the National Hero. The monarch's representative, the governor-general serves as chancellor of all these orders.

=== The Crown and the Defence Force ===
The rank insignia of a Belizean Colonel (left), Lieutenant-Colonel (centre), and Major (right) of the Belize Defence Force featuring the St Edward's Crown

The Crown sits at the pinnacle of the Belize Defence Force. The monarch is the Commander-in-Chief of the entire Forces. The Crown of St. Edward appears on Belize Defence Force badges and rank insignia, which illustrates the monarchy as the locus of authority.

Under the Belizean Defence Act, every member of the Belize Defence Force must swear allegiance to the monarch of Belize, on taking office. The current oath is:

"I, (name), do sincerely promise and swear that I will be faithful and bear true allegiance to Our Sovereign Lord the King and to His constitutionally Elected Government in Belize and that I will faithfully serve His Majesty in the Belize Defence Force until lawfully discharged, dismissed or removed, and that I will resist His Majesty's enemies and defend and protect all His Majesty's subjects and territory in Belize and cause His Majesty's peace to be kept and maintained and that I will in all matters appertaining to my service faithfully discharge my duties according to law."

=== The Crown and the Police Force ===
The badge of the Belize Police Department featuring the Crown

Every member of the Belize Police Department has to swear allegiance to the monarch of Belize, on taking office. Under the Police Act of Belize, every police officer must make the following declaration on joining the Department:

"I, (name), do solemnly and sincerely declare that I will be faithful and bear true allegiance to His Majesty, King Charles the Third, His Heirs and Successors, and that I will faithfully serve His Majesty the King, His Heirs and Successors, during my service in the Department and will obey all orders of the Governor-General and of the officers placed over me, and will subject myself to all Acts, Orders and Regulations, from time to time in force, relating to the Department."

All riot proclamations are also issued in the monarch's name and end with the phrase "God Save the King".

St Edward's Crown is used on the badge of the Belize Police Department, and is incorporated into the rank insignias for commissioner, senior superintendent, and superintendent.

=== Royal symbols ===
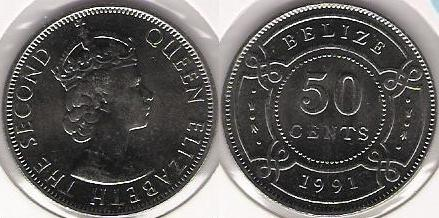
A Belizean 50-cent coin with an effigy of Elizabeth II on the obverse

The main symbol of the Belizean monarchy is the sovereign himself. Thus, framed portraits of him are displayed in public buildings and government offices. Many Belizeans also keep portraits of the royal family in their homes. Queen Elizabeth II appeared on some commemorative Belizean stamps. All banknotes of the Belize dollar featured the Queen's portrait, until the introduction of a new series in 2025. Her crowned effigy featured prominently on Belizean coins until 2026.

A crown is also used to illustrate the monarchy as the locus of authority, appearing on police force, postal workers, prison officers, and Belize Defence Force regimental and maritime badges and rank insignia.

God Save the King is the royal anthem of Belize.

=== Royal visits ===
External videos
- A Look Back At Past Royal Visits; Source: Channel 5 Belize.

==== 20th century ====
Princess Margaret visited Belize in 1958. The Duke of Edinburgh visited in 1962. Prince Michael of Kent represented the Queen at the independence celebrations in September 1981.

Elizabeth II, Queen of Belize, visited the country in October 1985. She was welcomed by the mayor and given the key to Belize City. She spent the night in Government House before flying to Dangriga the following day where she watched a Junkanoo Dance by children and received a painting from the people of the Stann Creek District. She also met British Servicemen and women stationed in Belize. During the visit, the Queen was served the famous gibnut during an official dinner. The next day, the British press in London ran headlines: "Queen Eats Rat in Belize". Ever since, the gibnut has often been referred to as "The Royal Rat", or "The Queen's Rat" in Belize.

Belize is the only one of my eighteen realms that I have not visited before and I have been looking forward to this moment for a long time.

— Elizabeth II of Belize, 1985

The Duke of Edinburgh returned in 1988 for a solo visit in his capacity as President of the World Wide Fund for Nature.

The Queen visited again in 1994. On her arrival at the airport in Belize City, she was greeted by 90% of the city's population. The Queen also visited the towns of San Ignacio, Punta Gorda, and Cahal Pech, one of Belize's many Mayan archaeological sites. The Queen attended a special sitting of the National Assembly, where she addressed the body for the first time and spoke of Belize's "robust democracy". The Queen also noted in her speech that this was the first occasion in which she had been welcomed by a song both written and performed by a governor-general.

==== 21st century ====
I bring to you warmest greetings from The Queen of Belize, whose Diamond Jubilee we are celebrating here tonight. Her Majesty has asked me to send her good wishes to you all. She remembers so fondly her visits to this beautiful realm and speaks of the warmth of welcome she received on her most recent visit in 1994.

— Prince Henry of Wales, 2012

The Princess Royal visited Belize in April 2001. The Princess visited the National Assembly of Belize at Belmopan, and the Belize Defence Force, Price Barracks, Ladyville, Belize City. During her visit, The Princess also visited San Lazaro Village Roman Catholic Primary School at Orange Walk, the Mennonite Community at Blue Creek Village, the Rio Bravo Conservation and Management Area, Marla's House of Hope, NOPCA Saves – Children's Home (National Organisation for the Prevention of Child Abuse), Belize Zoo, and the Commonwealth War Graves at Lord's Ridge Cemetery at Belize City.

In 2012, Prince Harry visited on the Queen's behalf to mark her Diamond Jubilee. During his visit, the Prince visited the remains of the ancient Mayan city of Xunantunich, launched a canoe named in honour of the Queen, and attended officially naming of the 'Her Majesty Queen Elizabeth II Boulevard' in Belmopan.

I am honoured to convey the very warmest wishes from my grandmother, The Queen of Belize, on the occasion of her Platinum Jubilee. She always speaks so fondly of her visits to Belize, which of course included a memorable stop here at Cahal Pech in 1994. And she may have mentioned something about a gibnut.

— The Duke of Cambridge, 2022

The Duke and Duchess of Cambridge visited in March 2022 on the occasion of the Queen's Platinum Jubilee. During their visit, the couple visited Mayan sites, explored Belize's Maya chocolate making, and celebrated the culture of the Garifuna community in Hopkins. The Duke and Duchess also learned about the restoration efforts of Belize's barrier reef being led by communities across the country, and scuba-dived to learn more about the second-largest barrier reef in the world. At the reception hosted by Governor-General Dame Froyla Tzalam in celebration of the Queen's Platinum Jubilee, the Duke said, "Now we know why Belize is so lovingly referred to as the Jewel. We hope to return again soon and to show our children this wonderful country. They are rather jealous that they're not here with us now". A visit to a Maya village in southern Belize was also planned, but was cancelled due to local protests.

In November 2025, the Duchess of Edinburgh visited Belize as part of a wider tour of South and Central America. During her time in Belize, the Duchess visited the Belize Council for the Visually Impaired, engaged with the San Antonio Women's Cooperative, participated in cultural activities with the Garifuna community ahead of Garifuna Settlement Day, and observed British Army training with the British Army Training Support Unit Belize. She concluded her visit with a trip to Laughing Bird Caye, where she learnt about ongoing coral reef restoration efforts within the Belize Barrier Reef Reserve System, a UNESCO World Heritage Site.

== Debate ==
In March 2022, the government of Belize set up the People's Constitutional Commission to review the laws of Belize, including the constitution, as well as the way the country is governed. Prime Minister Johnny Briceño said that he would bring about a referendum on the commission's broad recommendations. The final report of the People's Constitutional Commission was submitted to the Prime Minister in May 2025.

In May 2023, Briceño suggested that it was "quite likely" that Belize would be the next Commonwealth realm to become a republic. Briceño did not say if he would introduce a bill for a referendum on becoming a republic, which would need parliamentary approval.

An opinion poll conducted in February and March 2023 found that 48% of respondents supported the continuation of Belize's monarchy, against 43% who supported a republic. 71% of those who stated they preferred to keep the Crown said the monarchy was a "good thing" for the country.

== List of Belizean monarchs ==
Portrait	Regnal name (Birth–Death)	Reign over Belize		Full name	Consort	House
Portrait	Regnal name (Birth–Death)	Start	End	Full name	Consort	House
	Elizabeth II (1926–2022)	21 September 1981	8 September 2022	Elizabeth Alexandra Mary	Philip Mountbatten	Windsor
	Elizabeth II (1926–2022)	Governors-general: Dame Elmira Minita Gordon, Sir Colville Young, Dame Froyla Tzalam; Prime ministers: George Cadle Price, Sir Manuel Esquivel, Said Musa, Dean Barrow, Johnny Briceño				
	Charles III (b. 1948)	8 September 2022	present	Charles Phillip Arthur George	Camilla Shand	Windsor
	Charles III (b. 1948)	Governors-general: Dame Froyla Tzalam; Prime ministers: Johnny Briceño				

== See also ==
- Lists of office-holders
- List of prime ministers of Elizabeth II
- List of prime ministers of Charles III
- List of Commonwealth visits made by Elizabeth II
- Monarchies in the Americas
- List of monarchies
