= Pan American Day =

Day honouring countries of North and South America

- Official name: Pan American Day
- Observed by: Several Countries in The Americas
- Date: April 14
- Next time: 14 April 2027
- Frequency: Annual

Pan American Day is a holiday observed by several countries in North and South America. It commemorates the First International Conference of American States which concluded on April 14, 1890, creating the International Union of American Republics, the forerunner to the Organization of American States (OAS). The holiday was originally proposed by the organization in 1930, and was first observed on April 14, 1930.

Parades are held, some schools put on plays, the orchestra plays music, people set up exhibits, and pageants are sometimes held.

== Honduras ==
Though the Organization of American States (OAS) includes 35 countries, Honduras is the only country who observes a public holiday to mark the events of 1890. It is celebrated on April 14.

== United States ==
In the United States, Pan American Day is observed by Presidential proclamation on April 14. In addition, the entire week on which the holiday falls is observed as Pan American Week. On April 7, 2017, President Donald Trump proclaimed Pan American Day and Pan American Week on April 7, 2017.
