= Louise Blenman =

Guyanese lawyer and jurist

The Honourable Louise Esther Blenman
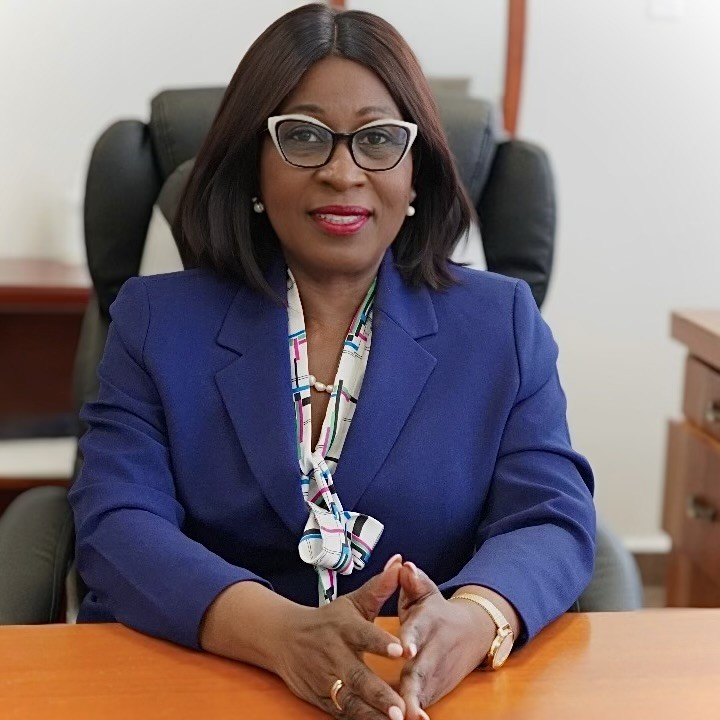

Chief Justice of Belize
- Incumbent
- Assumed office 2022
- Preceded by: Michelle Arana (acting)

Personal details
- Born: Georgetown, Guyana
- Education: University of the West Indies (LL.B.) Hugh Wooding Law School (L.E.C.) University of London (LL.M.)

Louise Esther Blenman is the Chief Justice of Belize and a former Appellate Judge of the Eastern Caribbean Supreme Court. She is the first woman to ever be appointed to the post. On 22 November 2022, she was sworn in as the first Chief Justice of the High Court and the Court of Appeal after the successful passage of the Senior Courts Act.

== Early life ==
She is Guyanese by birth and Saint Lucian by naturalisation. She obtained a Bachelor of Laws degree (Upper Second Honours) from the University of the West Indies in 1986, a Legal Education Certificate from the Hugh Wooding Law School in 1988, and a Master of Laws from the University of London with Merit.

Her legal career began in Guyana in 1988 where she served in various capacities including as Acting Deputy Solicitor General in the Attorney General's Chambers. In 1990, while employed at the Attorney General's Chambers she was awarded a Commonwealth Scholarship and completed the Commonwealth Lawyers' Course at the Institute of Advance Legal Studies and the University of London. During this period she was a pupil of Lord Anthony Lester, QC of Herne Hill. In Guyana, she also served as an acting Magistrate in the criminal division of the country's Magistrate Courts. She practiced at the private bar as an associate to Mr. Rex McKay, SC. And, from 1992 to 2000, she served as a lecturer in law at the University of Guyana.

== Career as jurist ==
In September 2000, Justice Blenman was appointed the Solicitor General of Saint Lucia - a post she held until she was elevated to the bench of the High Court of the Eastern Caribbean Supreme Court in 2003. As a High Court Judge, she served in Saint Vincent and the Grenadines, the Commonwealth of Dominica, Antigua and Barbuda and Anguilla. She also served as a member of several committees, boards and commissions both in Guyana and in the Eastern Caribbean. From January 2010 to January 2016, she served as Chairperson of the Eastern Caribbean Supreme Court's Judicial Education Institute. She was a member of the Eastern Caribbean Supreme Court Mediation Committee. She also served as chair of the Mediation Committees in Antigua and Barbuda and Anguilla, Chair of the Eastern Caribbean Supreme Court Sentencing Guidelines Committee and a member of the Criminal Justice Reform Committee in Saint Vincent and the Grenadines. She also served as a member of the Judicial and Legal Services Commission of Anguilla.

After serving 9 years as a High Court Judge, Justice Blenman was appointed a Justice of Appeal Eastern Caribbean Supreme Court in 2012. She served for ten years as an appellate judge. She was sworn in as the Chief Justice of Belize on September 2, 2022.

Legal offices
| Preceded by Michelle Arana (acting) | Chief Justice of Belize; 2022-present | Succeeded by Incumbent |
