= September Celebrations =

Pair of holidays in Belize

The September Celebrations are a pair of holidays in Belize only eleven days apart. They are:

- Battle of St. George's Caye Day (alternatively, National Day), 10 September, celebrated since 1898;
- Independence Day, 21 September, celebrated since 1981.

A calendar of activities has traditionally been held every year centred on both events. Annual traditions such as the Queen of the Bay pageant, concerts and talent shows, the Citizens Parade on the Tenth and Uniform Parade on the 21st and Carnival (traditionally held on the middle Saturday but has been held on other days) add to the Celebrations.

In 2007, September Celebrations began on 31 August and concluded on 22 September with a postponed Carnival (it had been postponed for two weeks due to Hurricanes Dean and Felix).

The National Celebration Commission selects a theme for each year's celebrations. In 2018, it was "Belize Da Fi Wi – Now & Forever, 8867".

== See also ==
- Public holidays in Belize
