= Garifuna Settlement Day =

Public holiday in Belize

- Observed by: Belize
- Date: 19 November
- Next time: 19 November 2026
- Frequency: Annual

Garifuna Settlement Day is a public holiday in Belize, celebrated each year on November 19. (Note: Chapter 289 of the laws of Belize states that if the holiday falls on a Sunday, the following Monday is observed as the bank and public holiday.)

== History ==
The holiday was created by Belizean civil rights activist Thomas Vincent Ramos in 1941. It was recognized as a public holiday in the southern districts of Belize in 1943, and declared a national holiday in 1977.

== Purpose ==
The holiday celebrates the settlement of the Garifuna people in Belize after being exiled from the Grenadines by the British.

== Location ==
The major festivities for the holiday occur in the town of Dangriga, including parades, street music, and traditional dancing.

== See also ==
- Garifuna history
- Punta Gorda
