= Governor-General of Belize =

Representative of the monarch

- Coat of arms of Belize

- Flag of the governor-general

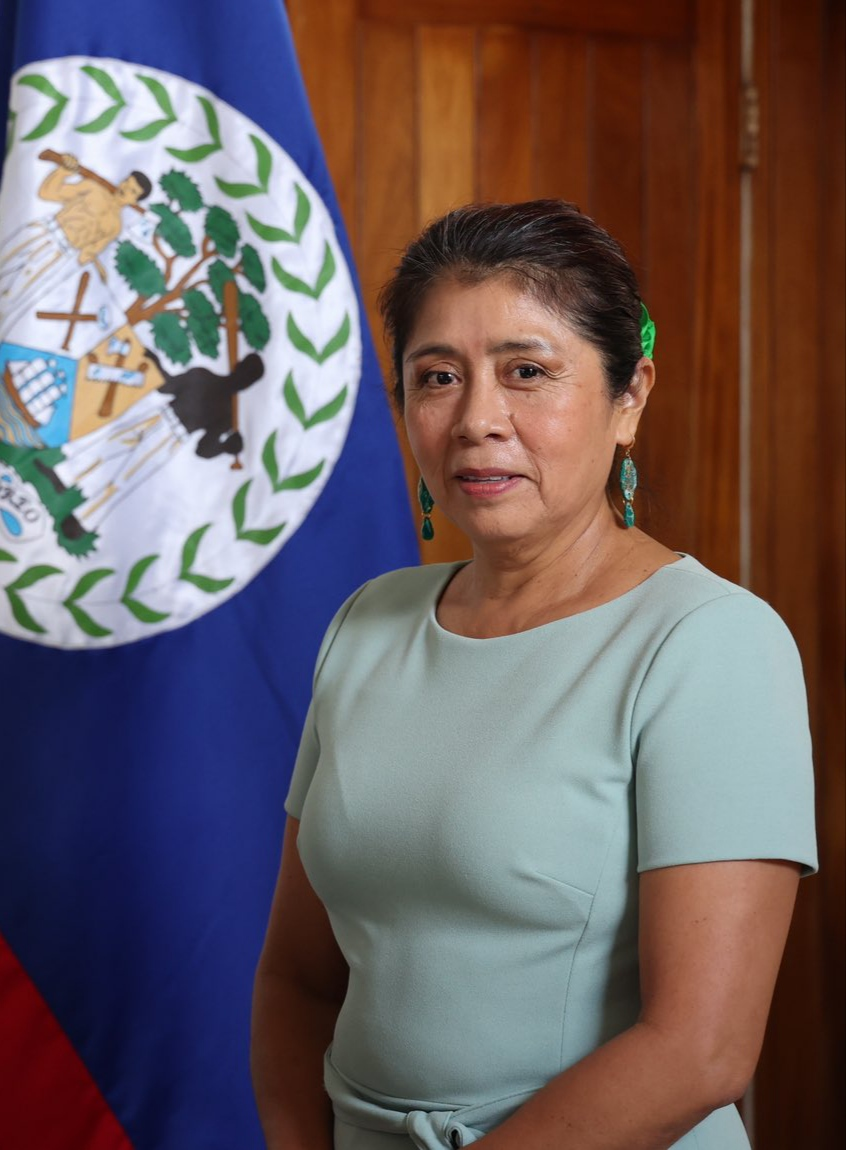
- Incumbent; Dame Froyla Tzalam since 27 May 2021
- Style: Her Excellency
- Residence: Government House, Belize (former); Belize House, Belmopan (since 1984)
- Appointer: Monarch of Belize; on the advice of the prime minister
- Term length: 7 years
- Constituting instrument: Constitution of Belize
- Formation: 21 September 1981
- First holder: Dame Elmira Minita Gordon
- Salary: BZ$75,000
- Website: Official website

The governor-general of Belize is the representative of the Belizean monarch,currently King Charles III, in Belize. The governor-general is appointed by the monarch on the recommendation of the prime minister of Belize. The functions of the governor-general include appointing ministers, judges, and ambassadors; giving royal assent to legislation passed by the National Assembly; and issuing writs for election.

In general, the governor-general observes the conventions of the Westminster system and responsible government, maintaining a political neutrality, and has to act only on the advice of the prime minister. The governor-general also has a ceremonial role: hosting events at the official residence—Belize House in the capital, Belmopan—and bestowing honours to individuals and groups who are contributing to their communities. When travelling abroad, the governor-general is seen as the representative of Belize and its monarch.

Governors-general are appointed for a seven-year term of office. Since 27 May 2021, the governor-general has been Dame Froyla Tzalam.

The office of the governor-general was created on 21 September 1981, when Belize gained independence from the United Kingdom as a sovereign state and an independent constitutional monarchy. Since then, three individuals have served as governor-general.

== Appointment ==
The governor-general is formally appointed by the monarch of Belize. When a new governor-general is to be appointed, the current prime minister recommends a name to the monarch, who by convention accepts that recommendation. At the installation ceremony, the new governor-general takes an Oath of Allegiance and Office. These oaths are administered by the chief justice of Belize.

== Functions ==
External videos
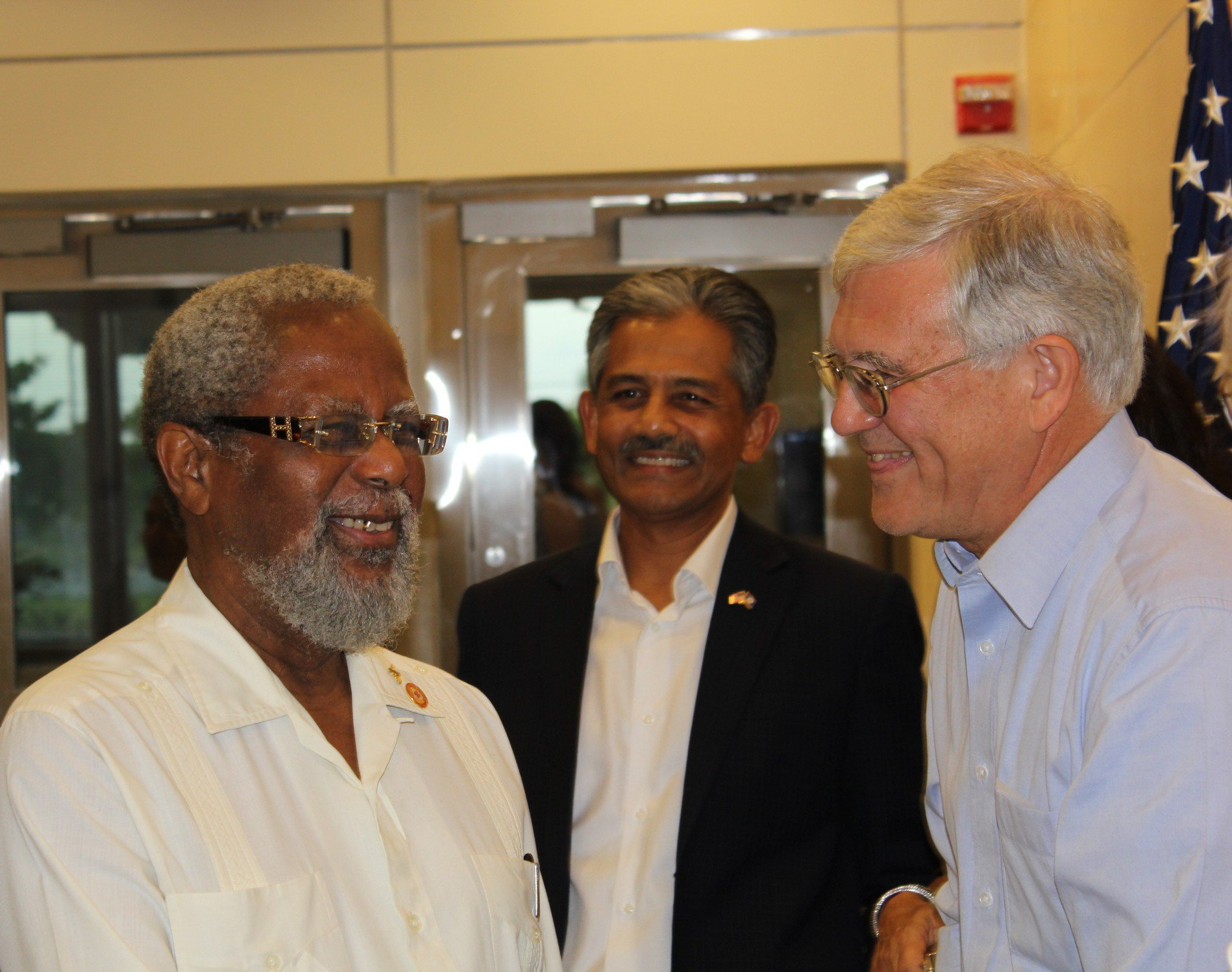
- Governor-General Sir Colville Young (left) attending a diplomatic function at US Embassy Belize, 2011
- Role of the Governor General in Belize's Government Source: Channel 5 Belize

The governor-general's powers and roles are derive from the Constitution of Belize's Part IV, sections 30 to 35 and set out certain provisions relating to the governor-general.

I intend to carry out the constitutional role of this office with the required diligence. It is also my hope that time will permit me to carry out more than my constitutional duties. This is an institution with its own culture, however, like all institutions, it is inhabited by people.

— Governor-General Dame Froyla Tzalam, 2021

=== Constitutional role ===
The governor-general is responsible for dissolving parliament and issues writs for new elections. After an election, the governor-general formally requests the leader of the political party which gains the support of a majority in parliament to form a government. The governor-general commissions the prime minister and appoints other ministers after the election.

The prime minister keeps the governor-general fully informed concerning the general conduct of the government of Belize and furnishes the governor-general with such information as the governor-general may request with respect to any particular matter relating to the government of Belize.

The governor-general, on the Sovereign's behalf, gives royal assent to laws passed by the National Assembly of Belize.

The governor-general acts on the advice of government ministers, to issue regulations, proclamations under existing laws, to appoint state judges, ambassadors and high commissioners to overseas countries, and other senior government officials.

The governor-general is also responsible for issuing Royal Commissions of Inquiry, and other matters, as required by particular legislation; and authorises many other executive decisions by ministers such as approving treaties with foreign governments.

The governor-general may, in certain circumstances, exercise without – or contrary to – ministerial advice. These are known as the reserve powers, and include:

- appointing a prime minister if an election has resulted in a 'hung parliament'.
- dismissing the prime minister after the prime minister lost the confidence of the parliament.
- dismissing any minister acting unlawfully.
- refusing to dissolve the House of Representatives despite a request from the prime minister.

=== Ceremonial role ===
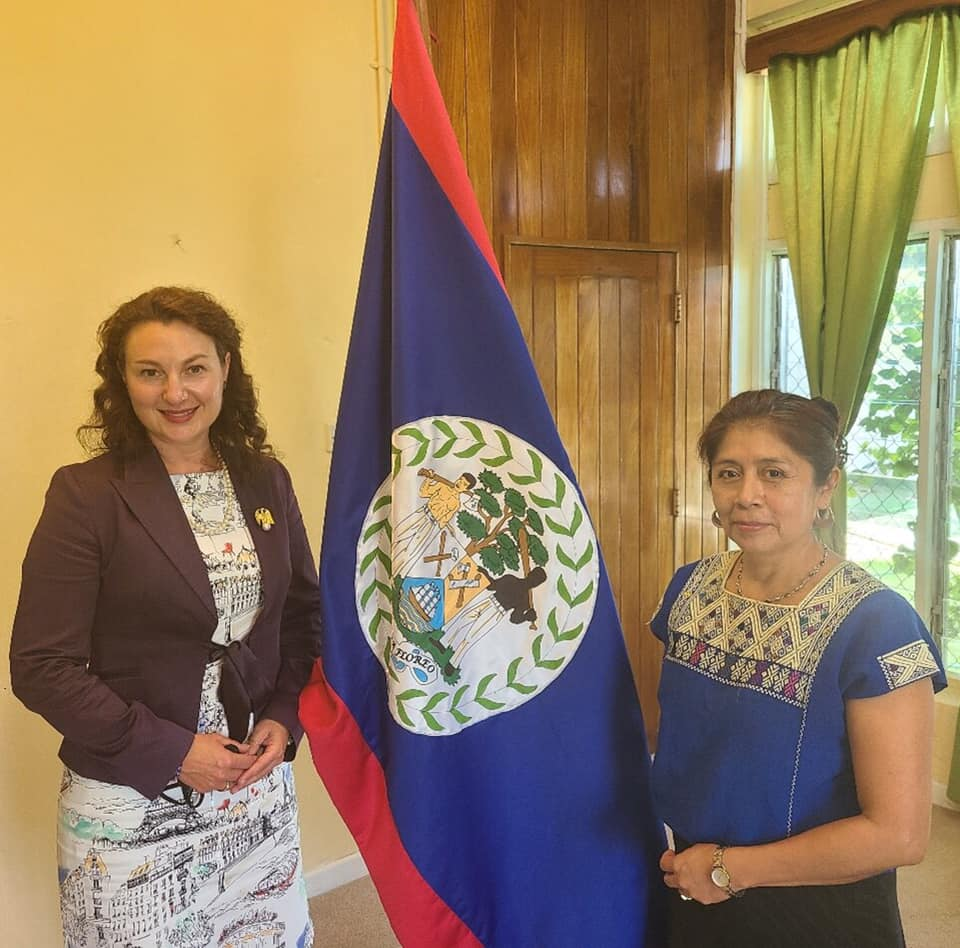
Governor-General Froyla Tzalam with Leyla Moses-Ones, US Chargé d'Affaires, 2021

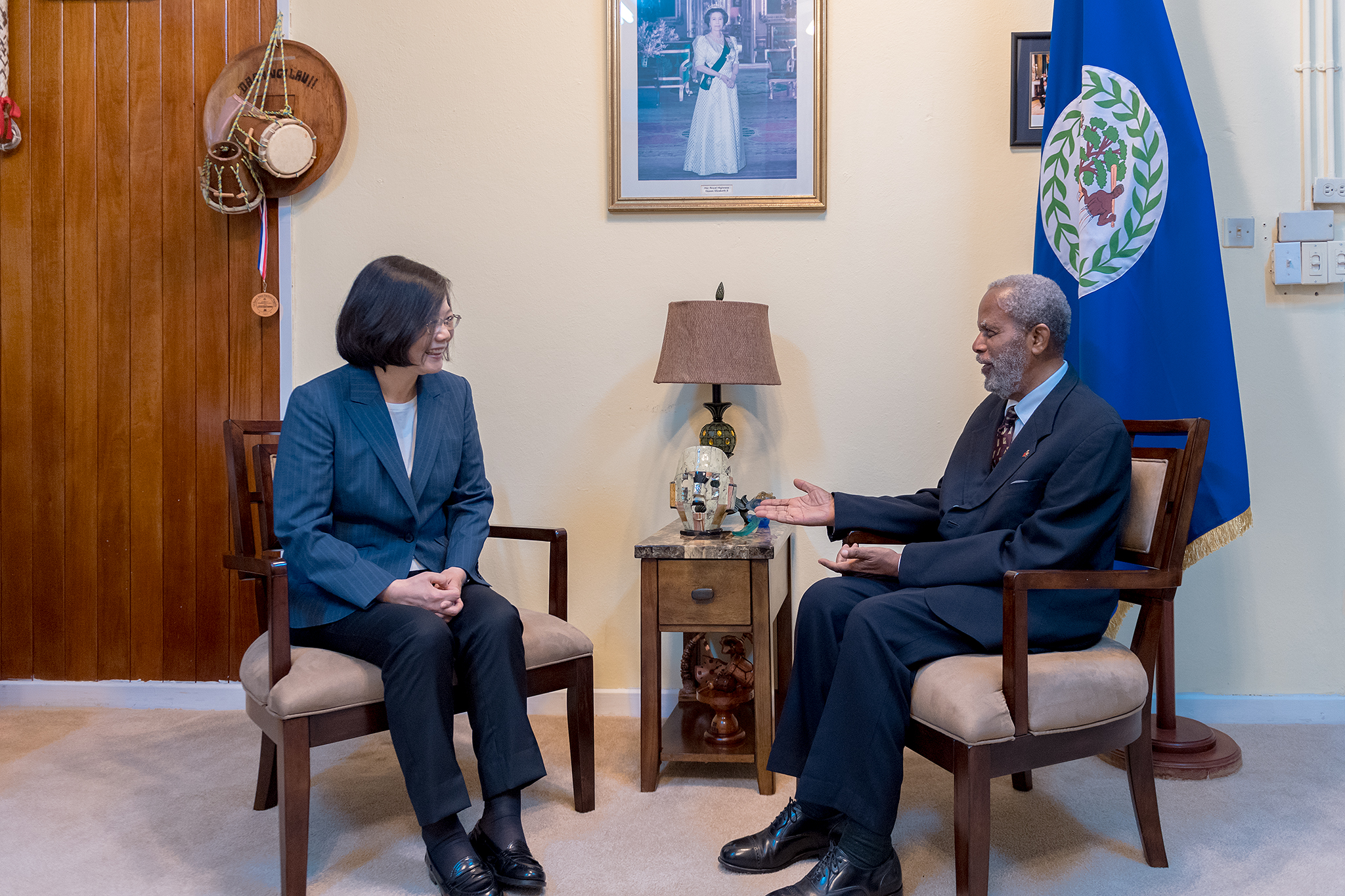
Governor-General Sir Colville Young with President Tsai of Taiwan, 2018

The governor-general's ceremonial duties include opening new sessions of parliament by delivering the Speech from the Throne, welcoming visiting heads of state, and receiving the credentials of foreign diplomats.

The governor-general attends military parades and special occasions, and presents Colours and other insignia to units of the Belize Defence Force and the Police Force.

The governor-general also presents honours at investitures to persons for notable service to the community, or for acts of bravery.

== Privileges ==
=== Salary ===
The Governor-General (Conditions of Service) Act 1989 defines the salary, pension and other entitlements of the governor-general. The act was amended in 2021 to provide for a fixed seven-year term of office and raise the governor-general's salary to BZ$75,000. This was the first increase in salary since 1989.

=== Symbols ===
Flag of the governor-general of Belize

The governor-general uses a personal flag, which features a lion passant atop a St. Edward's royal crown with "Belize" written across a scroll underneath, all on a blue background. It is flown on buildings and other locations in Belize to mark the governor-general's presence.

A viceregal salute —composed of the first verse of "God Save the King" followed by the chorus of the Belizean National Anthem, "Land of the Free"— is used to greet the governor-general upon arrival at, and mark his or her departure from most official events.

=== Residences ===
The governor general resided at Government House, Belize until 1984, even after the capital had moved to Belmopan in 1970. In 1984, the governor general moved to Belize House in Belmopan, formerly the residence of the British High Commission on North Ring Road and Melhado Parade.

== List of governors-general ==
Following is a list of people who have served as Governor-General of Belize since independence in 1981.

Denotes Acting Governors-General

| No. | Portrait | Name (Birth–Death) | Term of office | | | Monarch (Reign) |
| No. | Portrait | Name (Birth–Death) | Took office | Left office | Time in office | Monarch (Reign) |
|---|---|---|---|---|---|---|
| 1 | | Dame Elmira Minita Gordon (1930–2021) | 21 September 1981 | 17 November 1993 | 12 years, 57 days | Elizabeth II (1981–2022) |
| 2 | | Sir Colville Young (b. 1932) | 17 November 1993 | 30 April 2021 | 27 years, 164 days | Elizabeth II (1981–2022) |
| – | | Stuart Leslie (b. 1964); Acting Governor-General | 30 April 2021 | 27 May 2021 | 27 days | Elizabeth II (1981–2022) |
| 3 | | Dame Froyla Tzalam (b. 1971) | 27 May 2021 | Incumbent | 5 years, 139 days | |
| 3 | | Dame Froyla Tzalam (b. 1971) | 27 May 2021 | Incumbent | 5 years, 139 days | Charles III (2022–present) |

== See also ==
- List of prime ministers of Belize
- List of colonial governors and administrators of British Honduras
