= Froyla Tzalam =

Governor-General of Belize since 2021

Her Excellency Dame Froyla Tzalam GCMG
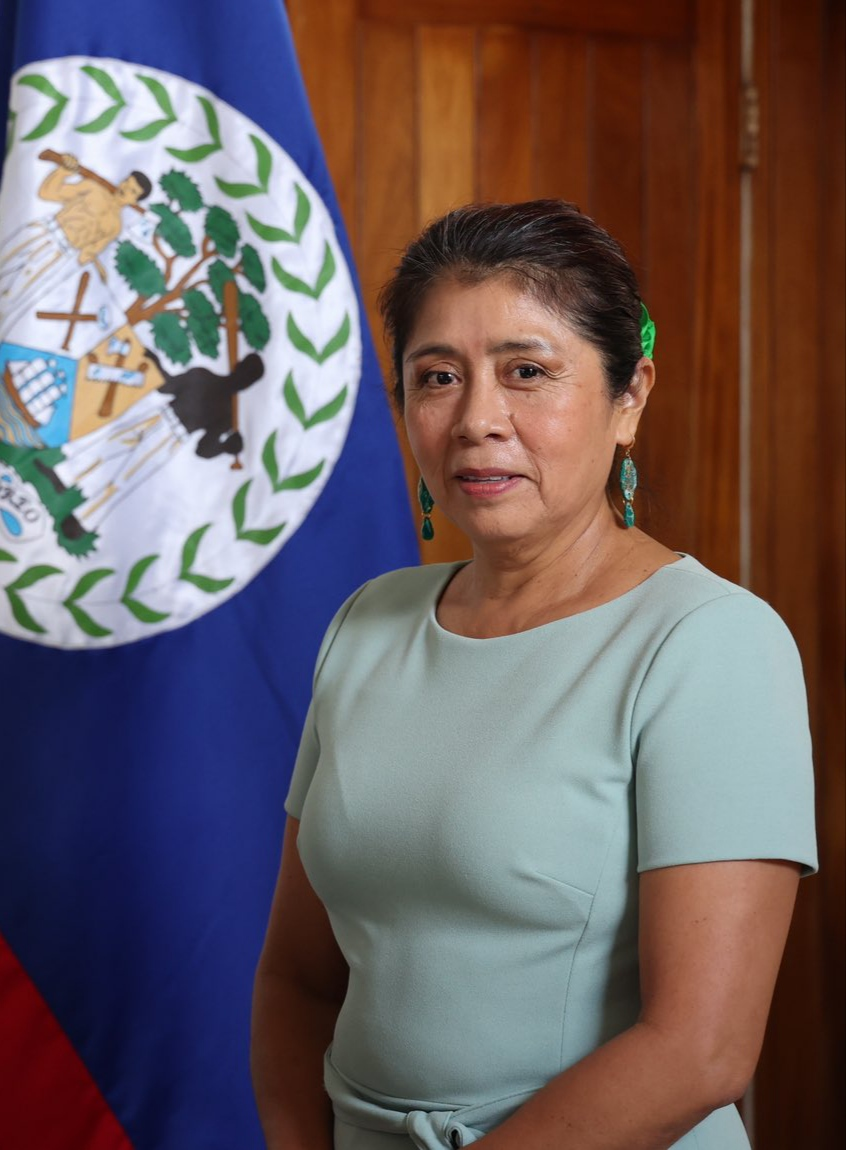
- Tzalam in 2022

3rd Governor-General of Belize
- Incumbent
- Assumed office 27 May 2021
- Monarchs: Elizabeth II; Charles III
- Prime Minister: Johnny Briceño
- Preceded by: Sir Colville Young

Personal details
- Born: 27 July 1971 (age 55) San Antonio, British Honduras (now Belize)
- Party: Independent
- Spouse: Daniel Mendez
- Children: 2
- Education: Trinity University (BA); University of Sussex (MA)

Dame Froyla Tzalam GCMG (born July 27, 1971) is a Belizean Mopan Maya anthropologist and community leader, who has served as the third governor-general of Belize since 27 May 2021.

She is the first indigenous person of Maya descent to serve as governor-general of any country in the history of the Commonwealth of Nations.

== Education ==
Tzalam is from the village of San Antonio, Toledo. She graduated with a BA degree in Anthropology from Trinity University, Texas. This was followed by a MA degree in Rural Development from University of Sussex.

== Career ==
She was Director of the African-Maya History Program in the Belize Ministry for Education and then Director of the Belize Institute of Social and Cultural Research. She became the executive director of the Sarstoon Temash Institute for Indigenous Management (SATIIM) in 2014.

Tzalam was shortlisted for nomination to the Senate in January 2017, but declined in order to concentrate on her work with SATIIM.

== Governor-General of Belize ==
Viceregal styles of Dame Froyla Tzalam (2021–present)
- Reference style: Her Excellency
- Spoken style: Your Excellency

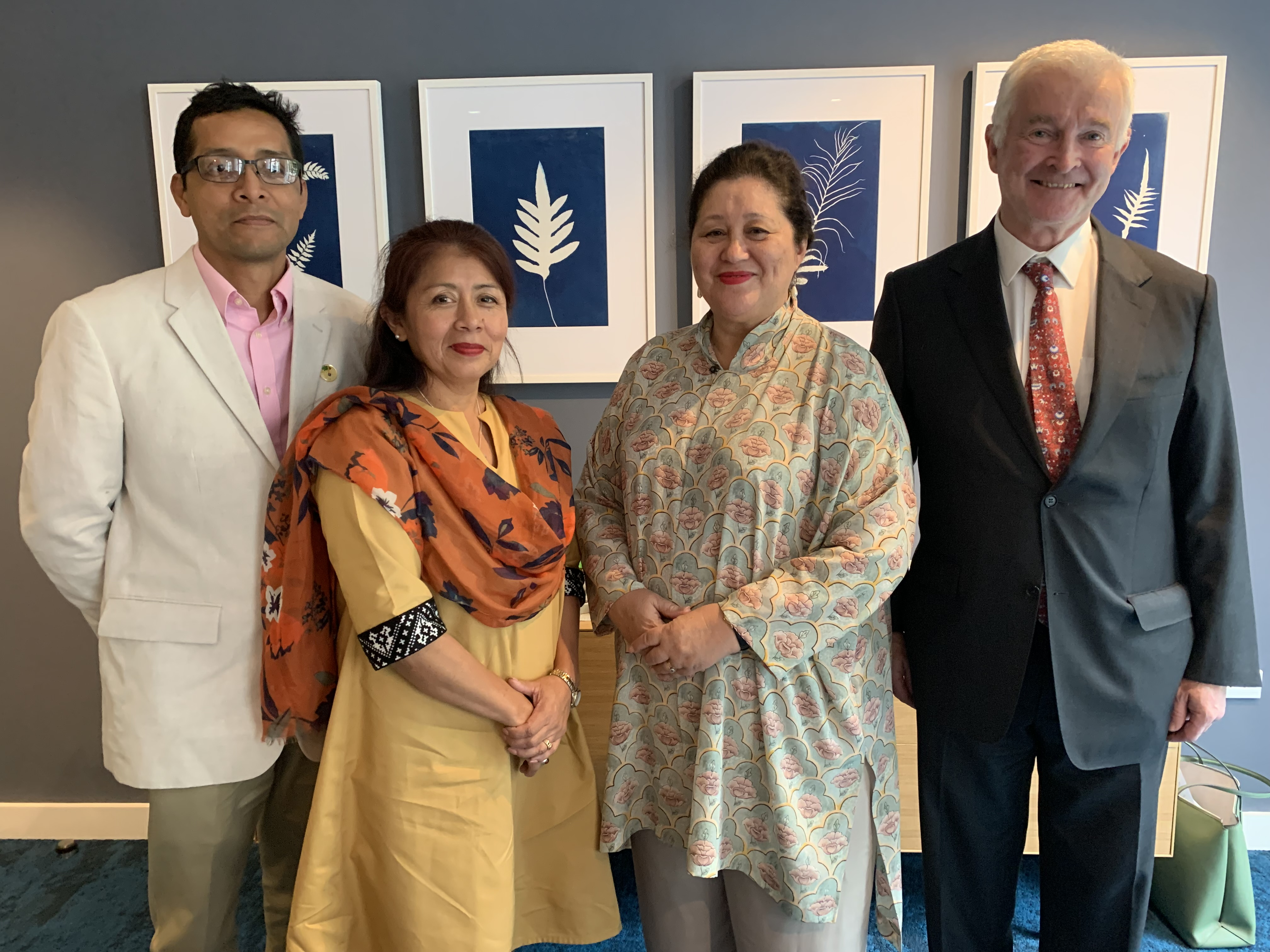
Dame Froyla meeting Dame Cindy Kiro, Governor-General of New Zealand, in London, 2022

It was announced on 22 April 2021 by Prime Minister of Belize John Briceno that she was nominated to be the next Governor-General of Belize following the retirement of Sir Colville Young. She is the third Governor-General and the second woman appointed to the role.

On 21 March 2022, she was invested as a Dame Grand Cross of the Order of St Michael and St George by Prince William, Duke of Cambridge, on behalf of Elizabeth II, Queen of Belize, during the Platinum Jubilee royal tour of Belize. In June 2022, she travelled to the United Kingdom to attend the Queen's Platinum Jubilee festivities in London.

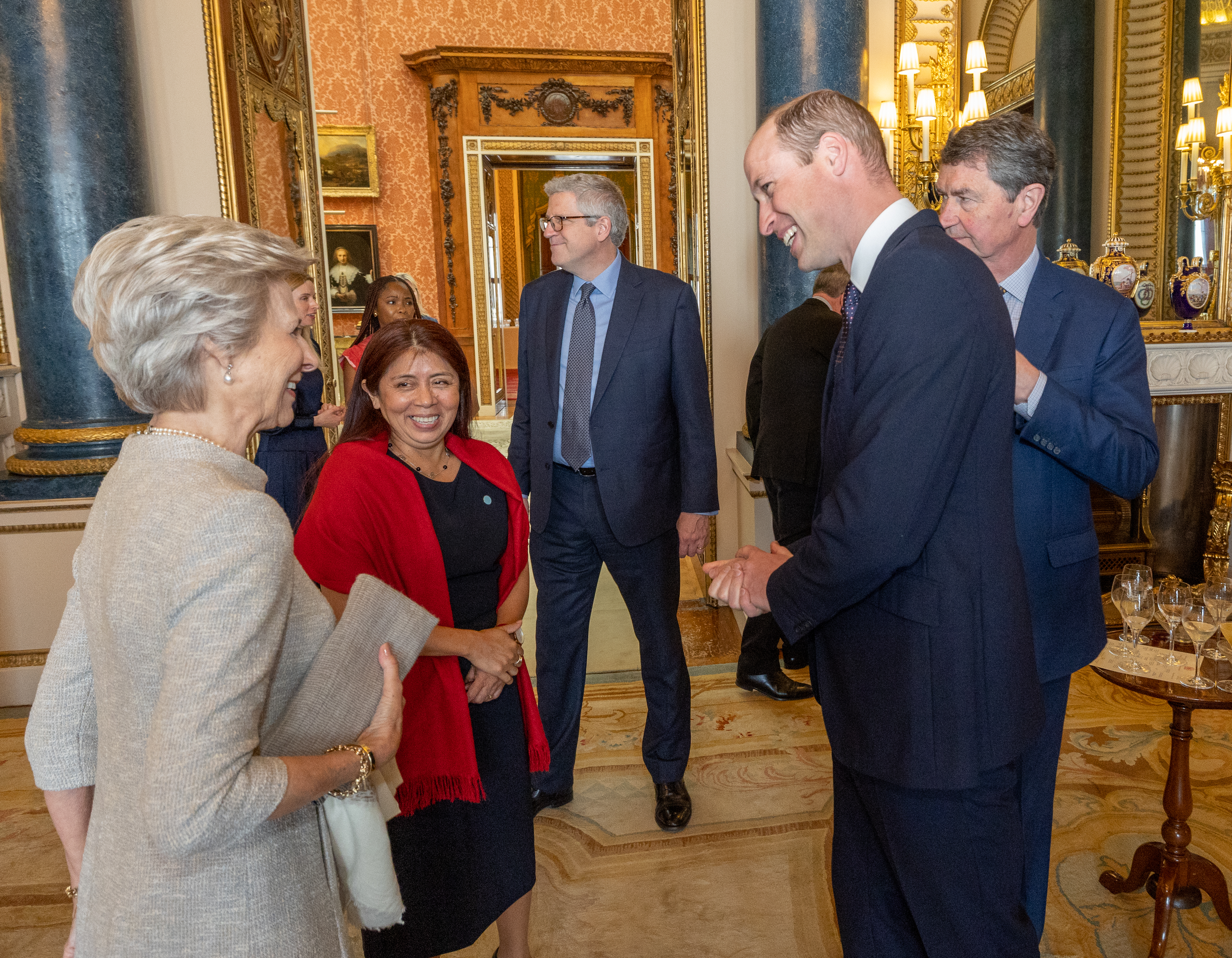
Tzalam with the Duchess of Gloucester and the Prince of Wales at Buckingham Palace during her visit for the coronation of King Charles III, 2022

Upon the death of Queen Elizabeth II in September 2022, Tzalam became the first governor-general of Belize to have served under two monarchs. She said that the Queen "was a much loved and respected figure across the globe", who "was known for her sense of duty and her devotion to a life of service". Tzalam also represented Belize at the Queen's state funeral in the United Kingdom. Alongside Minister Francis Fonseca she represented Belize at the Coronation of King Charles III in 2023.

Government offices
Preceded by Sir Colville Young	Governor-General of Belize; 2021–present	Incumbent
