= Roger Dawson-Yelverton =

Welsh barrister and colonial administrator

Chief Justice of the Bahamas
- In office 1890-1893

Personal details
- Born: Roger Dawson; 15 June 1845 Wales
- Died: 5 July 1912 (aged 67) Folkestone, Kent, England
- Spouse: Ellen Lawrence (m. 1872)
- Relatives: Edward Lawrence (brother-in-law)
- Education: Downing College, Cambridge

Roger Dawson-Yelverton (1845–1912) was a Welsh barrister, Chief Justice of the Bahamas from 1890 to 1893. Born Roger Yelverton Dawson, he changed his surname and was often known as Roger Yelverton or R. D. Yelverton.

== Early life ==
Yelverton was born 15 June 1845, the son of Roger Dawson and Barbara Yelverton Powys, and was educated at Rugby School. He matriculated at Magdalen Hall, Oxford in 1865, at age 20, and entered the Middle Temple in 1866. In 1867 he moved university, matriculating at Downing College, Cambridge, and was called to the bar at the Middle Temple, in 1869.

As a barrister he went the South-Eastern Circuit and became Deputy Judge of West London County Courts.

== Chief Justice of the Bahamas ==
Dawson-Yelverton was appointed Chief Justice in 1890 as successor to Henry William Austin. Like Austin, he clashed with Ormond Drimmie Malcolm, Attorney-General of the colony. Like Austin, he encountered opposition to reformative measures and impartial justice from Ambrose Shea, the colony's governor, who sided with the interests of a white business clique in the islands.

In 1892, Dawson-Yelverton became embroiled in a contempt of court dispute with Alfred Moseley, editor of the Nassau Guardian, Shea backed Moseley and, via a delegation of powers from the Colonial Office, released him from prison. A public row escalated, and after the 1892 general election brought the Liberal Marquess of Ripon to the Colonial Office, Dawson-Yelverton appealed to him. Shea countered with the influence of Joseph Chamberlain, who had invested on Andros in a wharf and sisal estate managed by his son Neville. The Colonial Office took the view that "abuses have existed and Mr. Yelverton has not conciliated the local clique."

The matter went to the Judicial Committee of the Privy Council. Dawson-Yelverton argued for judicial independence. Lord Coleridge CJ made it clear to him that a letter to the Pall Mall Gazette alleging government corruption in the colony had made it impossible for him to return there. Dawson-Yelverton resigned in anticipation of a dismissal. He was succeeded by Charles George Walpole.

== Later life ==
After his time in the Bahamas, Dawson-Yelverton gave attention to miscarriages of justice, in particular the case of George Edalji in 1905. He organised a petition to the Home Secretary on Edalji's behalf. He also concerned himself with the Adolf Beck case.

Dawson-Yelverton chaired the League of Criminal Appeal, and lobbied successfully, from 1888, for the creation of a Court of Criminal Appeal. He died on 5 July 1912, at Folkestone, and is buried in Plaistow Cemetery.

== Personal ==
Dawson-Yelverton married in 1872 Ellen Lawrence, daughter of James Lawrence of Park Hill, Lancashire, a brewer who was Mayor of Liverpool in 1844, and sister of Edward Lawrence.

Yelverton's change of surname was connected to his descent from Henry Yelverton, 3rd Earl of Sussex, who died without male heirs. The 3rd Earl was Yelverton's maternal grandfather's maternal grandfather, and the conditions in the Earl's will gave him reason to add the Yelverton surname.

Yelverton's maternal grandfather was Frederick Powys (1782–1850), third son of Thomas Powys, 1st Baron Lilford who married Mary Gould, daughter of Edward Thoroton Gould and Barbara Yelverton, who was the daughter of the 3rd Earl of Sussex. (Note: some sources conflate Barbara Yelverton Powys (Yelverton's mother) with her grandmother, the daughter of the 3rd Earl.)
