= Anita Allen (judge) =

Bahamian judge

Dame Anita Mildred Allen DBE (born 21 December 1947) is the President of the Court of Appeal of the Bahamas, a position which she has held since 30 November 2010.

== Career ==
Allen became a Justice of the Supreme Court of the Bahamas in 1995, and was elevated to Senior Justice in 2005. She also served as Acting Chief Justice in 2007. In November 2010, she succeeded Joan Sawyer as President of the Court of Appeal. She thus became the second woman to hold that post, and the third woman in a high position in the judiciary of the Bahamas.

She was appointed Dame Commander of the Order of the British Empire (DBE) in the 2016 New Year Honours.

== Personal life and education ==
Allen was born in New Providence. She did her secondary education at Government High School, her LL.B. at The College of Law in London, and her Certificate of Legal Drafting at the University of the West Indies at Cave Hill in Cave Hill, Saint Michael, Barbados.

She is married to former Cabinet Minister Algernon Allen. The couple have five children: Algernon Jr; Antoine, Aliya, Amil and Phylicia.

Legal offices
Preceded by Joan Sawyer	President of the Court of Appeal of the Bahamas; 2010–present	Succeeded by Incumbent
