= Tute (disambiguation) =

Tute is a card game.

Tute may also refer to:

== People ==
- Tute Ruoshi Zhujiu, chanyu of the Xiongnu
- Richard Clifford Tute, Bahamian judge
- Warren Tute (1914–1989), English sailor

== Other uses ==
- Tute Genomics, genomics startup
- Tute Bianche, militant Italian social movement

== See also ==
- List of variations of Tute
