= Burton Hall (judge) =

Sir Burton Hall KCHS
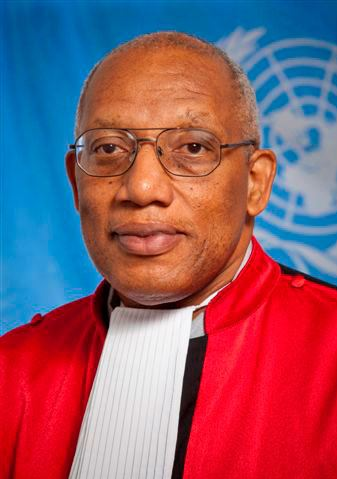

Judge of the International Residual Mechanism for Criminal Tribunals
- Incumbent
- Assumed office 1 July 2012

Judge of the International Criminal Tribunal for the former Yugoslavia
- In office 21 September 2016 – 31 December 2017
- In office 7 August 2009 – 30 July 2016

Chief Justice of the Bahamas
- In office 2001–2009
- Preceded by: Dame Joan Sawyer
- Succeeded by: Sir Michael Barnett

Personal details
- Born: 10 December 1947 (age 78) Nassau, Bahamas

Sir Burton Percival Curtis Hall, KCHS (born December 10, 1947, in Nassau, Bahamas) is a Judge of the UN International Residual Mechanism for Criminal Tribunals.

He previously served as a Justice of Court of Appeal of the Bahamas, the Chief Justice of the Supreme Court of the Bahamas, and a Judge of the International Criminal Tribunal for the Former Yugoslavia.

== Education ==
Hall received his early education at St John's College, Nassau, Bahamas, graduating in 1964, before returning in 1965 to pursue GCE 'A' Levels.

He received an LL.B. degree with upper-second-class honours from the University of the West Indies, Cave Hill, Saint Michael, Barbados in 1974. After which, he attended Norman Manley Law School in Mona, Jamaica where he graduated in 1976 with a Certificate in Legal Education.

== Career ==
=== Bahamian legal practice and judicial career ===
Hall was admitted to the Bahamas Bar on 6 October 1976, and then practised as an Assistant Counsel at the Office of the Attorney-General of the Bahamas.

He was appointed to act as a Stipendiary and Circuit Magistrate from August 1978 to August 1980. He then returned to the Office of the Attorney-General and was elevated to Crown Counsel. He became Acting Solicitor-General of the Bahamas in 1983, being confirmed to the post in 1984.

Hall served as a Justice of the Supreme Court of the Bahamas on 1 February 1991 and then as a Justice of Court of Appeal of the Bahamas from April 1997.

He was appointed Chairman of the 1998 National Crime Commission of the Bahamas and, on 4 August 1999, was appointed as the first Bahamian judge on the Inter-American Development Bank Administration Tribunal.

On 5 September 2001, he was confirmed as Chief Justice of the Supreme Court of the Bahamas (de facto head of the judiciary of the Bahamas), a position he occupied until 2009.

=== International judicial career ===
In August 2009, Hall was elected to serve as a Judge of the International Criminal Tribunal for the Former Yugoslavia. He was the presiding judge in the case of the Prosecutor v. Jovica Stanišić and Franko Simatović.

=== Memberships ===
In 2002, he became a fellow of the Commonwealth Judicial Institute, Dalhousie University School of Law.

Hall is a member of the Commonwealth Magistrates' and Judges' Association, Commonwealth Lawyers Association and the International Law Association, and holds associate membership in the American Bar Association (Associate Member) and the Canadian Bar Association (Associate Member).

== Honours and awards ==
Hall was knighted by Queen Elizabeth II in 2001. In 2003, he was appointed a Knight of the Order of St. Sylvester (KSS) by Pope John Paul II. In 2009, he was enrolled as a Knight of the Order of the Holy Sepulchre (KHS), also a papal order of knighthood. Currently (as of 2016), he holds the rank of Knight Commander of this order (KCHS).

In 2004, Hall was awarded the Pelican Alumni Peer award as outstanding alumnus of the University of the West Indies, Cave Hill Campus.
