= Vivian Blake (politician) =

Jamaican lawyer and politician (1921–2000)

Vivian O. Blake QC (15 March 1921 – 28 December 2000) was a Jamaican lawyer and politician. He served as president of the Jamaican Bar Association and chairman of the Bar Council's Disciplinary Committee, and became chief justice of the Bahamas.

== Biography ==
Vivian Osmond Scott Blake was born in St. James, Jamaica, was educated at Wolmer's Boys School in Kingston and studied law at Gray's Inn, London, from 1945 to 1948. Having been called to the Jamaica Bar, he worked at the law firm run by Norman Manley.

In March 1958, he was appointed Queen's Counsel. He was a member of the People's National Party, said to represent the party's "Glasspole tendencies", that is to say, its right wing. At a conference in 1964, he clashed with Vernon Arnett over proposals for land reform and the party's support for democratic socialism; Arnett's supporters blasted Blake as a "capitalist", "land baron", and "race-horse owner", while one of Blake's supporters drew a pistol. The conference quickly dispersed thereafter. In 1969, he vied with Michael Manley for leadership of the PNP; in the end, Manley achieved a decisive victory in the election to become party leader. Blake later became Jamaica's Minister of Industry and Commerce, until his resignation in July 1977, when he was succeeded by Danny Williams. He then left Jamaica and became a Justice of the Supreme Court of the Bahamas in September 1978. He served in that position until December 1981, following which he was elevated to Chief Justice from January 1982 to September 1983.

He died on 28 December 2000 at the age of 79.

Political offices
Preceded by	Minister of Industry and Commerce of Jamaica ?–1977	Succeeded by Danny Williams
Legal offices
Preceded by Harvey Lloyd da Costa	Chief Justice of the Bahamas; 1982–1983	Succeeded by Denis Malone (acting)
