= Hartman Longley =

Sir Hartman Godfrey Longley (born February 24, 1952, in Nassau, Bahamas) is the former Chief Justice of The Commonwealth of The Bahamas having been sworn on February 2, 2015.

== Education ==
Longley received his early education at the Government High School, Nassau, Bahamas, graduating in 1966.

== Career ==
Sir Hartman was called to the Bahamas Bar on October 6, 1976. He served as assistant counsel in the Attorney General's chambers from 1976 and 1978. He also served as a magistrate in Nassau and Freeport, from September 1993 to July 1995 and held the position of chief magistrate. He was appointed to the Supreme Court in July, 1995, he served until 2005, when he was appointed to the Court of Appeal, and returned to the Supreme Court in 2010.

He has served as Justice of the Supreme Court, Justice of the Court of Appeal, Senior Justice and, in February, succeeded Sir Michael Barnett as Chief Justice, the nation's highest judicial office. Sir Hartman has been appointed a Knight Bachelor in recognition of his contributions to the legal and judicial system of The Bahamas.

== Personal ==
Sir Hartman is married to the former Sonya L. Smith and is the father of two sons, one daughter and the grandfather of four.
