= Joan Sawyer (judge) =

Chief Justice of the Supreme Court of the Bahamas from 1996 to 2001

Dame Joan Augusta Sawyer

Chief Justice of the Bahamas
- In office 1996–2001

President of the Court of Appeal of the Bahamas
- In office 2001–2010

Personal details
- Born: 26 November 1940 (age 85) George Town, Exuma, Bahamas
- Education: University of London (LLB)
- Profession: Judge

Dame Joan Augusta Sawyer, DBE, PC (born 26 November 1940) is a Bahamian judge. She was Chief Justice of the Bahamas from 1996 to 2001 and President of the Court of Appeal of the Bahamas from 2001 to 2010. She was the first woman to ever serve in those two positions.

== Early life and education ==
Sawyer was born in George Town, Exuma, Bahamas in 1940. She attended the Georgetown Public School, Aquinas College, and the Government High School.

Sawyer began her career in 1958 as a clerk-trainee at the Ministry of Public Works. Subsequently, she obtained an LL.B. at the University of London.

Sawyer joined the government's Legal Department in 1970 and went to the College of Law in London in 1970 to study for the bar exams. Sawyer was called to the Bar of England and Wales at Gray's Inn on 19 July 1973 and to the Bahamas Bar on 12 September 1973.

== Legal career ==
By July 1974, Smith was serving as Crown Counsel, prosecuting cases on behalf of the Crown. In September 1978, she served as an acting magistrate on a widely-reported poaching case. In 1987, she served as an acting Supreme Court justice for two months.

Sawyer was named a Justice of the Supreme Court of the Bahamas on 6 May 1988, and served in that position until 30 June 1995. She returned to the bench on 1 November 1996 as Chief Justice, where she sat until 26 November 2001.

She was then appointed President of the Court of Appeal; a position from which she retired on 26 November 2010, her 70th birthday. She was succeeded in the position by Anita Allen, the second woman to hold the job. Sawyer is also a member of the Indian Council of Jurists.

== Awards and honours ==
Sawyer was made a Dame Commander of the Order of the British Empire on 25 November 1996. She was also notably the only Bahamian to serve on both the judicial and political branches of the Privy Council.

== Personal life ==
Sawyer was married to the late Geoffrey Sawyer; the couple had one son, Samuel.

Legal offices
| Preceded by Cyril S. S. Fountain | Chief Justice of the Bahamas; 1996–2001 | Succeeded by Burton P. C. Hall |
| Preceded by Edward Zacca | President of the Court of Appeal of the Bahamas; 2001–2010 | Succeeded by Anita Allen |
