= Kenneth Benjamin (judge) =

Caribbean jurist

The Honourable Kenneth Benjamin Chief Justice of Belize (Retd.)
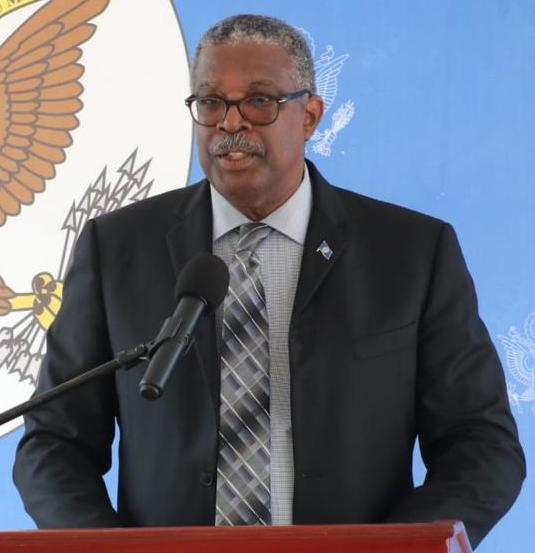
- in 2019

10th Chief Justice of Belize
- In office 15 September 2011 – 20 March 2020
- Nominated by: Dean Barrow
- Appointed by: Colville Young
- Preceded by: Samuel Awich (acting)
- Succeeded by: Michelle Arana (acting)

Personal details
- Born: Kenneth Andrew Charles Benjamin; 19 March 1955 (age 71) Georgetown, British Guiana
- Education: University of the West Indies (LLB), Hugh Wooding Law School

Kenneth Andrew Charles Benjamin (born 19 March 1955) is a Caribbean jurist. A dual national of Guyana and Antigua and Barbuda, he served as Chief Justice of Belize from 15 September 2011 to 20 March 2020.

== Career ==
Benjamin was born on 19 March 1955 in Georgetown, Guyana. In 1980 and 1981, Benjamin served as a magistrate in Georgetown, Guyana. He went on to serve as Assistant Judge Advocate for the Guyana Defence Force. From 1988, he continued his work as a judge in Antigua, including from 1991 to 1993 as Chief Magistrate of Antigua. Following that, he was named as a judge of the High Court of the Eastern Caribbean Supreme Court. In this capacity he served in Montserrat and the British Virgin Islands in the succeeding years. From 2002 to 2007, Benjamin's position as ECSC High Court Judge took him to Grenada; he was succeeded there by Francis Cumberbatch. In 2007, he relocated to St. Lucia to become the presiding judge of the High Court of St. Lucia's criminal division.

In July 2011, following the retirement of Abdulai Conteh, Attorney-General B. Q. Pitts announced that Benjamin would be Belize's new Chief Justice. In the interim, Samuel Lungole Awich served as acting CJ. Pitts indicated his hopes that Benjamin, at the time 56, would be able to hold his position until he reached the mandatory retirement age of 65.

== Personal life ==
Benjamin graduated from the Hugh Wooding Law School of the University of the West Indies in Trinidad and Tobago in 1977. He is married and has a daughter and a son.

Legal offices
Preceded by Samuel Awich (acting)	Chief Justice of Belize; 2011-2020	Succeeded by Michelle Arana (acting)
