= Denis Malone =

British judge

Sir Denis Eustace Gilbert Malone (24 November 1922 – 2000) was a British jurist in the Caribbean.

He graduated from Wycliffe College in 1941. He was commissioned a flight sergeant in the Royal Air Force on 15 May 1945. He served as Solicitor-General of Barbados and then, in February 1961, was appointed a Puisne Judge of the Supreme Court of British Honduras (today Belize). He rose to Chief Justice of Belize in 1974, serving until 1977, when he was replaced by Albert Staine, the first native of Belize to hold that position. He was knighted in the 1977 Silver Jubilee and Birthday Honours.

He went on to serve on the Supreme Court of the Bahamas as a Justice from May 1979 to September 1983, Acting Chief Justice from September to December 1983, and Senior Justice from January 1984 to November 1989. Afterwards, he became Chief Justice of the Cayman Islands; in 1991, he called for more court facilities to handle the rising backlog of civil and criminal cases.

He was married to Diana. However, they had no children. His father had been Chief Justice of the Leeward islands and he had two brothers.

He died in Poole, Dorset, in 2000.

Legal offices
Preceded by	Solicitor-General of Barbados ?	Succeeded by
Preceded by Arthur Dickson	Chief Justice of Belize; 1974–1977	Succeeded by Albert Staine
Preceded by Vivian O. Blake	Chief Justice of the Bahamas (acting); 1983	Succeeded by Philip Telford Georges
Preceded by	Chief Justice of the Cayman Islands ?	Succeeded by
