= Arthur Kirwan Agar =

British barrister and colonial judge

Sir Arthur Agar

Chief Justice of British Honduras
- In office 1936–1940
- Preceded by: Charles Wilton Wood Greenidge
- Succeeded by: Sir Carleton Langley

Personal details
- Born: 31 August 1877
- Died: July 1942 (aged 64) Springfield, Dominica, British Windward Islands
- Education: Brighton College

Sir Arthur Kirwan Agar (31 August 1877 – July 1942) was a British barrister and colonial judge. He was Chief Justice of British Honduras from 1936 to 1940.

== Biography ==
Agar was the son of solicitor Edward Larpent Agar, of Milford House, Milford-on-Sea and the grandson of William Agar, after whose father Agar Town was named. His siblings included the landscape designer Madeline Agar and the Anglo-Australian zoologist Wilfred Eade Agar.

Agar was educated at Brighton College. During the First World War, he served in the Royal Army Service Corps, reaching the rank of captain. After being called to the English Bar by Gray's Inn, Agar entered the Colonial Legal Service in 1920. He was appointed Chief Justice of British Honduras in 1936, serving until 1940. Knighted in 1939, Agar died in Springfield, Dominica in 1942.

Agar married in 1905 Winifred Milbourne Raynes, daughter of John George Raynes; they had two daughters. He married secondly in 1930 Josephine Hutchings, daughter of Hugh Houston Hutchings.
