= Guy Wilmot McLintock Henderson =

British colonial judge (1887–1997)

Sir Guy Wilmot McLintock Henderson QC

Chief Justice of the Bahamas
- In office 1951–1960
- Preceded by: Sir Oswald Lawrence Bancroft
- Succeeded by: Sir Ralph Abercrombie Campbell

Attorney-General of the Protectorate of Uganda
- In office 1948–1951

Personal details
- Born: 13 July 1887
- Died: 21 May 1987 (aged 99)
- Children: 3
- Education: Trinity College, Cambridge
- Occupation: Barrister and colonial judge

Sir Guy Wilmot McLintock Henderson (13 July 1887 – 21 May 1987) was a British barrister and colonial judge who was Attorney-General of the Protectorate of Uganda from 1948 to 1951, and Chief Justice of the Bahamas from 1951 to 1960.

== Early life and education ==
Henderson was born on 13 July 1887, the eldest son of Arthur James and Charlotte West Henderson. He was educated at Blundell’s School, Tiverton; Whanganui Collegiate School, New Zealand, and at Trinity College, Cambridge. He served in the First World War in Europe in the Royal Fleet Auxiliary (1915–1919), and rose to the rank of lieutenant. In 1923, he was called to the Bar by the Inner Temple.

== Career ==
Henderson went to Burma in 1924, and was in private practice there until 1929. The following year, he returned to England and joined the prosecuting staff of the General Post Office in London. In 1932, he went to the Bahamas where he served as stipendiary and circuit magistrate. From 1937 to 1940, he served as crown counsel in Tanganyika Territory, and from 1940 to 1945, served as a legal draftsman in Nigeria.

After the Second World War, Henderson was transferred to the Malayan Civil Service as deputy Chief Legal Adviser to the British Military Administration where he served from 1945 to 1946. From 1946 to 1948, he served as Solicitor-General of Singapore, and was acting Attorney-General on the re-opening of the Supreme Court of Singapore in April 1946 and on subsequent occasions. From 1948 to 1951, he was Attorney-General and QC in the Protectorate of Uganda. In 1951, he was appointed Chief Justice of the Bahamas, remaining in office until his retirement in 1960.

== Personal life and death ==
Henderson married Ann Dring-Campion in 1930, and they two sons and a daughter.

Henderson died on 21 May 1987, aged 99.

== Honours ==
Henderson was created a Knight Bachelor in the 1956 Birthday Honours.
