= Private schools in the United Kingdom =

Fee-paying school in the United Kingdom

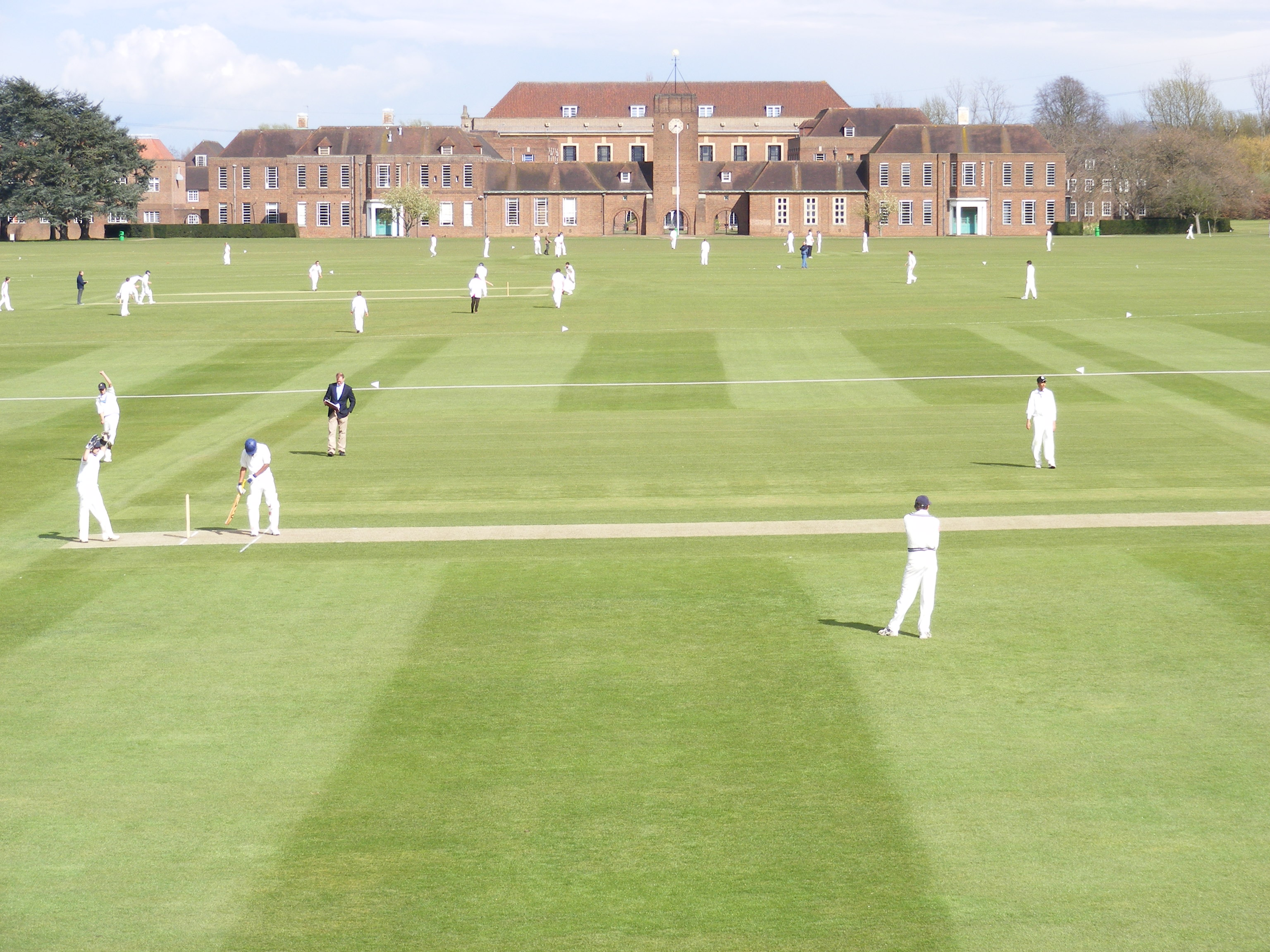
Merchant Taylors' School (1561) is one of the nine Clarendon Commission schools.

In the United Kingdom, private schools (also called independent schools) are schools that require fees for admission and enrollment. Some have financial endowments and most are governed by a board of directors consisting of school governors. Many are owned and operated by a mixture of corporations, trusts and individuals. They are independent of many of the regulations and conditions that apply to state-funded schools. For example, the schools do not have to follow the National Curriculum for England, although many such schools do.

Historically in the UK, the term private school referred to a school as private property, privately owned, in contrast to public property or a financial endowment, subject to a trust or of charitable status. Many of the older private schools catering for the 13–18 age range in England and Wales are known as public schools, seven of which were the subject of the Public Schools Act 1868. The term public school meant they were then open to pupils regardless of where they lived or their religion (while in most other English-speaking countries public school refers to a publicly funded state school). Preparatory schools educate younger children up to the age of 13 to prepare (prep) them for entry to the public schools and other secondary schools. In 2023, the Independent Schools Council (ISC), a lobbying group for private school industry, claimed that their members schools contributed £16.5 billion to gross value added (GVA) in Britain.

Some former grammar schools converted to a private fee-charging model following the 1965 Circular 10/65 and the subsequent cessation in 1975 of government funding support for direct grant grammar schools. There are around 2,600 independent schools in the UK, which educate around 615,000 children, approximately 7 per cent of all British school-age children. Among pupils over the age of 16, the figure is 18 per cent. In addition to charging tuition fees, they may also benefit from gifts, charitable endowments and charitable status. Some of these schools (1,300) are members of the Independent Schools Council. In 2021, the average annual cost for private schooling was £15,191 for day schools and £36,000 for boarding schools. The Independent Schools Yearbook has been published annually since 1986. This was a name change of a publication that started in 1889 as The Public Schools Yearbook.

== Origins ==
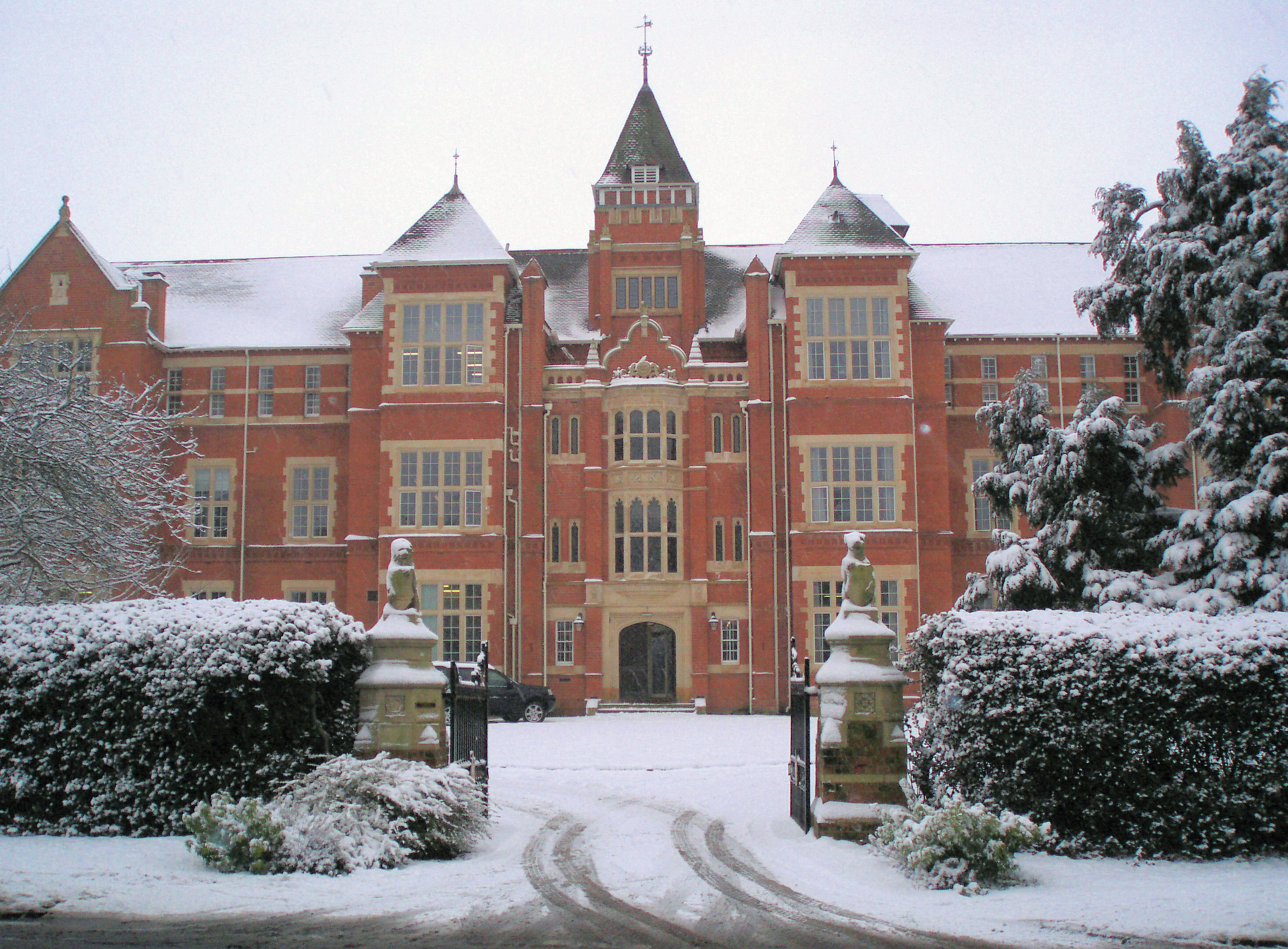
Warwick School (914) is one of the oldest private schools in Britain.

Some independent schools are particularly old, such as The King's School, Canterbury (founded 597), The King's School, Rochester (founded 604), St Peter's School, York (founded c. 627), Sherborne School (founded 705), Wells Cathedral School (founded 909), Warwick School (c. 914), King's Ely (c. 970) and St Albans School (948). These schools were founded by the church and were under its complete dominion. During the late 14th and early 15th centuries the first schools independent of the church were founded. Winchester (1382) and Oswestry (1407) were the first of their kind (although they had a strong Christian religious ethos) and such early "free grammar schools" founded by wealthy benefactors paved the way for the establishment of the modern "public school". These were typically established for male students from poor or disadvantaged backgrounds. English law has always regarded education as a charitable end in itself, irrespective of poverty.

The transformation of free charitable foundations into institutions which sometimes charge fees came about readily: the foundation would only afford minimal facilities, so that further fees might be charged to lodge, clothe and otherwise maintain the scholars, to the private profit of the trustees or headmaster. Also, facilities already provided by the charitable foundation for a few students could profitably be extended to further paying pupils. Some schools still keep their foundation students in a separate house from other pupils, or distinguish them in other ways.

After a time, such fees eclipsed the original charitable income, and the original endowment would become a minor part of the school's finances. By 2022 senior boarding schools were charging fees of over £40,000 per annum. Most of the independent schools today are still registered as a charity, and bursaries are available to students on a means test basis. Christ's Hospital in Horsham is an example: a large proportion of its students are funded by its charitable foundation or by various benefactors.

== Victorian expansion ==
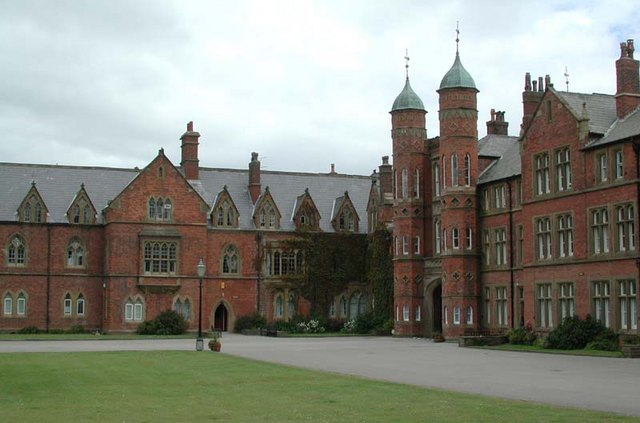
Rossall School (1844)

The educational reforms of the 19th century were particularly important. Reformers included Thomas Arnold at Rugby, and then Samuel Butler and later Benjamin Kennedy at Shrewsbury; the first of these emphasised team spirit and "muscular Christianity" and the latter the importance of scholarship and competitive examinations. Edward Thring of Uppingham School introduced major reforms, focusing on the importance of the individual and of competition, as well as the need for a "total curriculum" with academia, music, sport and drama being central to education. Most public schools developed significantly during the 18th and 19th centuries, and came to play an important role in the development of the Victorian social elite. Under a number of forward-looking headmasters leading public schools created a curriculum based heavily on classics and physical activity for boys and young men of the upper and upper middle classes.

They were schools for the gentlemanly elite of Victorian politics, armed forces and colonial government. Much of the discipline was in the hands of senior pupils (usually known as prefects); this was not just a way to reduce staffing costs, but was also seen as vital preparation for the senior pupils' later roles in public or military service. More recently heads of public schools have been emphasising that senior pupils now play a much reduced role in maintaining discipline. To an extent, the public school system influenced the school systems of the British Empire, and recognisably public schools can be found in many Commonwealth countries.

== 20th and 21st centuries ==
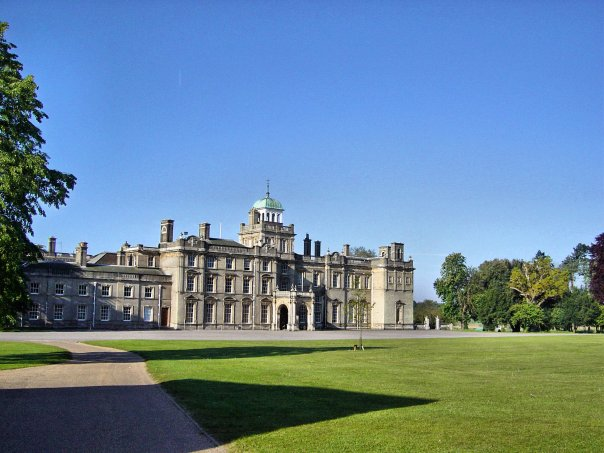
Culford School (1873), a former 'direct grant' school

Until 1975 there had been a group of 179 academically selective schools drawing on both private and state funding, the direct grant grammar schools. The Direct Grant Grammar Schools (Cessation of Grant) Regulations 1975 required these schools to choose between full state funding as comprehensive schools and full independence. As a result, 119 of these schools became independent.Among the schools that chose to become fully independent were Culford School, Pocklington School, Manchester Grammar School, Latymer Upper School and North London Collegiate School. Culford School, which had been granted direct-grant status by November 1945, opted to remain outside the state-maintained sector following the reforms of 1975. Other former direct grant schools, including Notre Dame High School Sheffield, St Cuthbert's High School in Newcastle upon Tyne and Xaverian College in Manchester, entered the state-maintained sector.

Pupil numbers at independent schools fell slightly during the mid-1970s recession. At the same time participation at all secondary schools grew dramatically, so that the share of the independent sector fell from a little under 8 per cent in 1964 to reach a low of 5.7 per cent in 1978. Both these trends were reversed during the 1980s, and the share of the independent schools reached 7.5 per cent by 1991. The changes since 1990 have been less dramatic: the share fell to 6.9 per cent by 1996 before increasing very slightly after 2000 to reach 7.2 per cent in 2012. By 2015, the figure fell back to 6.9 per cent, with the absolute number of pupils attending independent schools falling everywhere in England apart from in the South East.

=== England and Wales ===
In 2011 there were more than 2,500 private schools in the UK educating some 628,000 children, comprising over 6.5 per cent of UK children, and more than 18 per cent of pupils over the age of 16. In England the schools account for a slightly higher percentage than in the UK as a whole. According to a 2010 study by Ryan & Sibetia, "the proportion of pupils attending independent schools in England is currently 7.2 per cent (considering full-time pupils only)".

Most of the larger private schools are either full or partial boarding schools, although many have now become predominantly day schools. By contrast there are only a few dozen state boarding schools. Boarding-school traditions give a distinctive character to British private education, even in the case of day-pupils. A high proportion of private schools, particularly the larger and older institutions, have charitable status.

Inspections in England

The Independent Schools Council (ISC), through seven affiliated organisations, represents 1,300 schools that together educate over 80 per cent of the pupils in the UK private sector. Those schools in England which are members of the affiliated organisations of the ISC are inspected by the Independent Schools Inspectorate under a framework approved by the Government's Department for Education (DfE). Private schools not affiliated to the ISC in England are inspected by Ofsted. Private schools accredited to the ISC in Scotland and Wales and Northern Ireland or others in England out with the inspectorial bodies listed above are inspected through the national inspectorates in each country.

=== Scotland ===
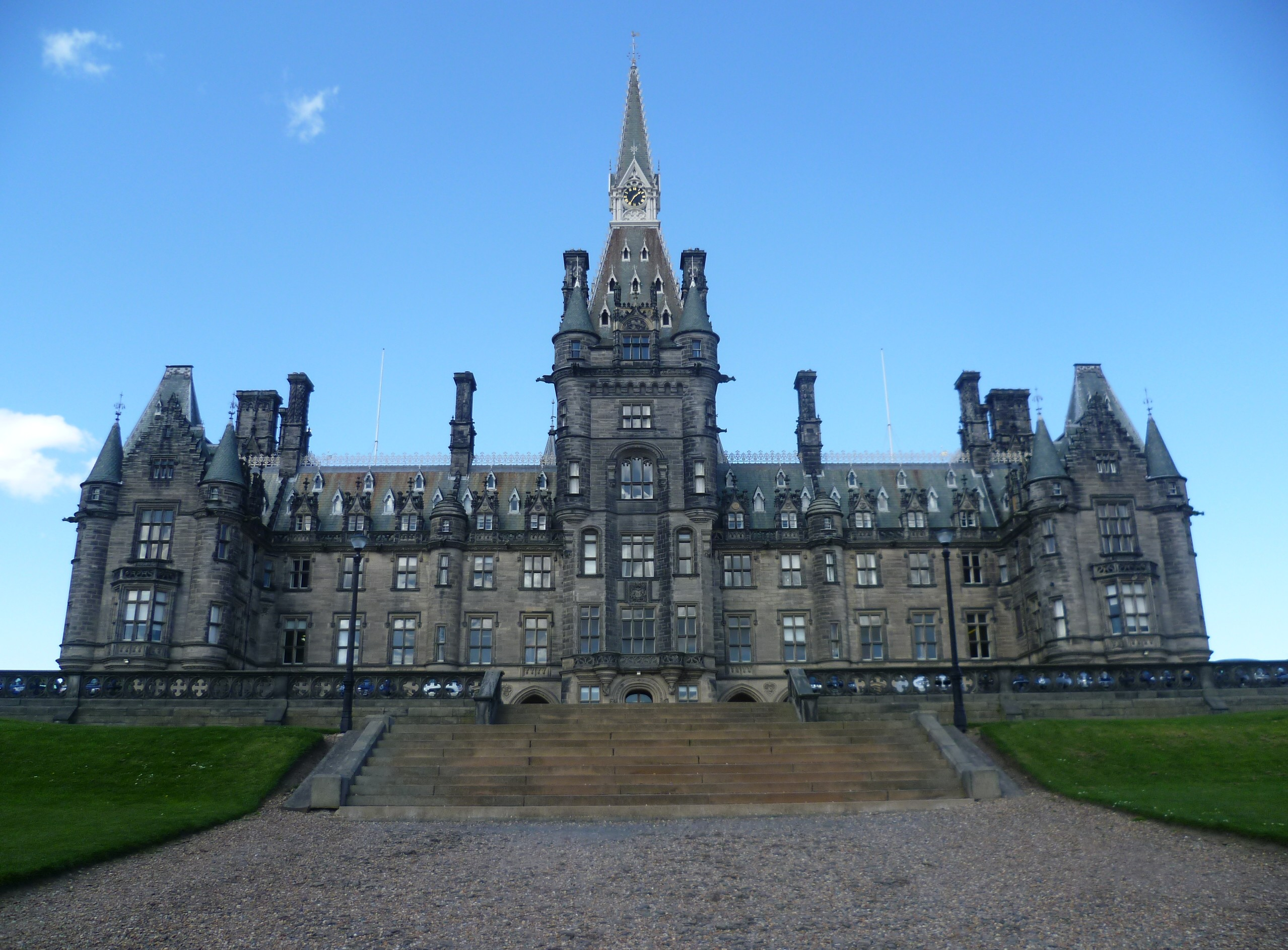
Fettes College (1870) is one of Scotland's most famous private schools, particularly since the 1997 Labour Government led by former pupil, Tony Blair.

Private schools in Scotland educate about 31,000 children. Although many of the Scottish private schools are members of the ISC they are also represented by the Scottish Council of Independent Schools, recognised by the Scottish Parliament as the body representing private schools in Scotland. Unlike England, all Scottish private schools are subject to the same regime of inspections by Education Scotland as local authority schools and they have to register with the Learning Directorate. The nine largest Scottish private schools, with 1,000 or more pupils, are George Watson's College, Hutcheson's Grammar School, Robert Gordon's College, George Heriot's School, St Aloysius' College, The Glasgow Academy, Dollar Academy, the High School of Glasgow and the High School of Dundee.

In Scotland, it was common for children destined for private schools to receive their primary education at a local school. This arose because of Scotland's long tradition of state-funded education, which was spearheaded by the Church of Scotland from the seventeenth century, long before such education was common in England. Private prep schools only became more widespread in Scotland from the late 19th century (usually attached to an existing secondary private school, though exceptions such as Craigclowan Preparatory School and Cargilfield Preparatory School do exist), though they are still much less prevalent than in England. In modern times many secondary pupils in Scotland's private schools will have fed in from the school's own fee-paying primary school, therefore there is considerable competition facing pupils from state primary schools who seek to enter a private school at secondary stage, via entrance examinations.

== Selection ==
Private schools, like state grammar schools, are free to select their pupils, subject to general legislation against discrimination. The principal forms of selection are financial, in that the pupil's family must be able to pay the school fees, and academic, the latter determined via interview and examination. Credit may also be given for musical, sporting or other talent. Entrance to some schools may be orientated to pupils whose parents practise a particular religion, or schools may require pupils to attend religious services.

Only a small minority of parents can afford school fees averaging (as of 2021) over £36,000 per annum for boarding pupils and £15,000 for day pupils, with additional costs for uniform, equipment and extra-curricular activities. Scholarships and means-tested bursaries to assist the education of the less well-off are usually awarded by a process which combines academic and other criteria.

Private schools are generally academically selective, using the competitive Common Entrance Examination at ages 11+ or 13+. Schools often offer scholarships to attract abler pupils (which improves their average results); the standard sometimes approaches the General Certificate of Secondary Education (GCSE) intended for age 16. Poorly-performing pupils may be required to leave, and following GCSE results can be replaced in the sixth form by a new infusion of high-performing sixth-form-only pupils, which may distort apparent results. On the other hand, pupils performing poorly cannot legally be excluded from a state school solely for poor performance.

== Conditions ==
Private schools, as compared with maintained schools, generally have more individual teaching; much lower pupil-teacher ratios at around 9:1; longer teaching hours (sometimes including Saturday morning teaching) and homework (known as prep); though they have shorter terms. They also have more time for organised extra-curricular activities.

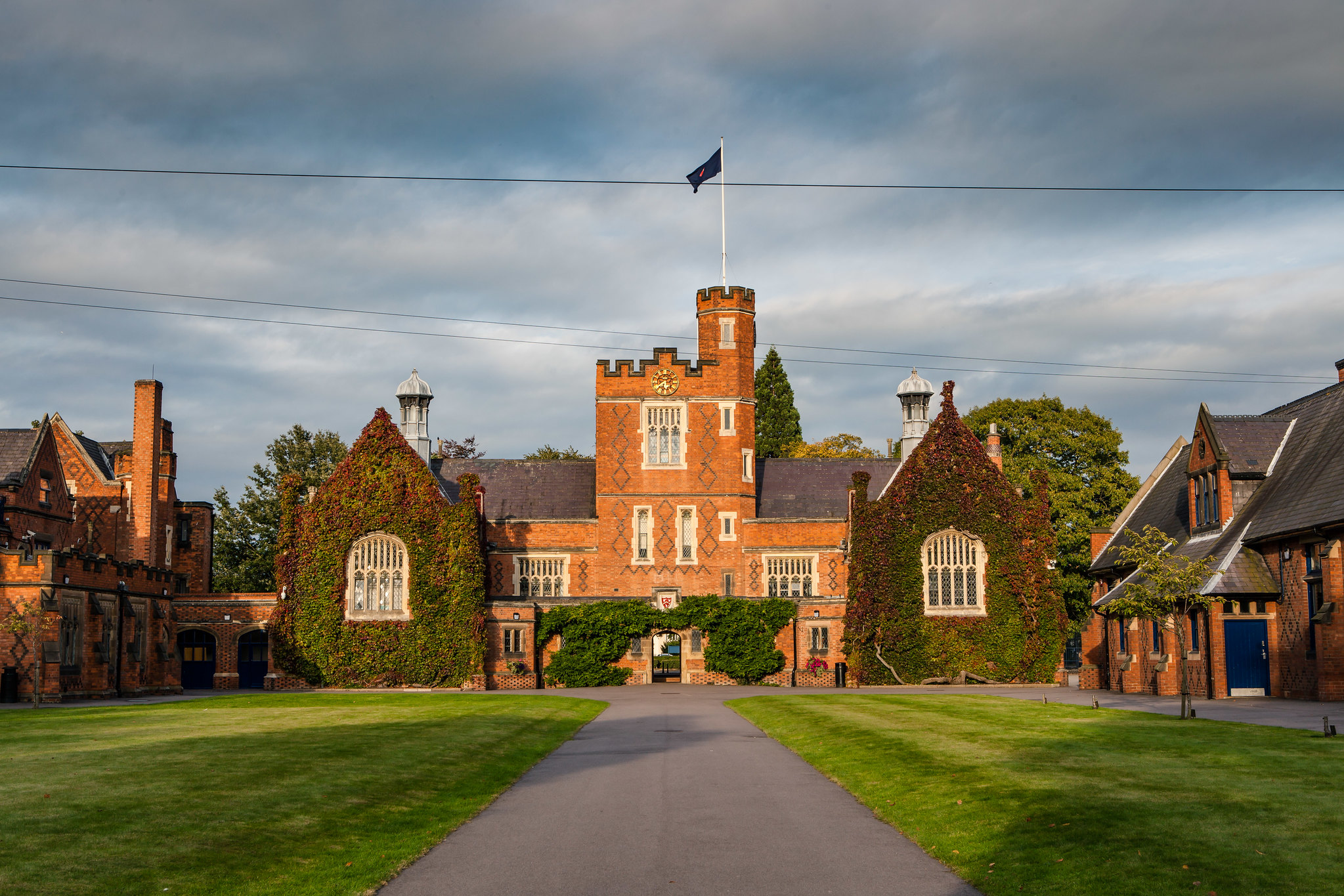
Loughborough Grammar School (1495) has a pupil-teacher ratio of 9:1.

As boarding schools are fully responsible for their pupils throughout term-time, pastoral care is an essential part of boarding education, and many such schools have their own distinctive ethos, including social aspirations, manners and accents, associated with their own school traditions. Many former pupils aspire to send their own children to their old schools over successive generations. Most offer sporting, musical, dramatic and art facilities, sometimes with extra charges.

Educational achievement is generally very good. Independent school pupils are four times more likely to attain an A* at GCSE than their non-selective state sector counterparts, and twice as likely to attain an A grade at A-level. A much higher proportion go to university. Some schools specialise in particular strengths, academic or other, although this is not as common as it is in the state sector.

Independent schools can set their own discipline regime, with much greater freedom to exclude children. In England and Wales there are no requirements for teaching staff to have Qualified Teacher Status or to be registered with the General Teaching Council. In Scotland a teaching qualification and registration with the General Teaching Council for Scotland (GTCS) are mandatory for all teaching positions.

== Diversity of private schools ==
The UK's private school sector encompasses a range of institutions, reflecting diverse educational approaches and communities. Schools following alternative philosophies, such as Montessori and Steiner, emphasise child-centred learning and holistic development. Others address special educational needs (SEN), supporting students with conditions like dyslexia or autism, or offer international curricula, such as the International Baccalaureate, to cater to multilingual communities. Faith-based schools, including Christian, Jewish, Muslim, and Hindu institutions, integrate religious values with academics. According to the Independent Schools Council (ISC), 681 member schools include a variety of faith-based and culturally specific institutions.

== Charitable status ==
Many independent schools have charitable status, which means they are not charged business rates by local councils, amongst other benefits. This is estimated to save the schools about £200 per pupil each year and to cost the Exchequer about £100 million, assuming that an increase in fees would not result in any transfer of pupils from the private to the maintained sector. This has long been an area of debate.

Since the Charities Act 2006 came into effect, charitable status has been based on an organisation providing a "public benefit", as judged by the Charity Commission. In 2008, the Charity Commission published guidance, including guidance on public benefit and fee charging, setting out issues to be considered by charities charging high fees that many people could not afford. The Independent Schools Council was granted permission by the High Court to bring a judicial review of the Charity Commission's public benefit guidance, as it affected the private education sector. This was heard by the Upper Tribunal at the same time as a reference by the Attorney General asking the Tribunal to consider how the public benefit requirement should operate in relation to fee-charging charitable schools. The Upper Tribunal's decision, published on 14 October 2011, concluded that in all cases there must be more than a de minimis or token benefit for the poor, but that the trustees of a charitable private school should decide what was appropriate in their particular circumstances.

The Charity Commission accordingly published revised public benefit guidance in 2013. In Scotland, under the Charities and Trustee Investment Act (Scotland), there is an entirely separate test of charitable status, overseen by the Office of the Scottish Charity Regulator, which assesses the public benefit provided by each registered school charity.

== Taxation of school fees ==
At the time of the introduction of Value-added tax in the United Kingdom (VAT) in 1973, the fees of private schools were given an exemption, echoing the previous exemption from paying Purchase Tax. At the 2017, the 2019, and 2024 United Kingdom general elections, the Labour Party campaigned on a policy of removing this exemption.

The new Labour government confirmed the policy in its October 2024 United Kingdom budget, and it was put into law by a Finance Act, with the exemption from VAT removed with effect from 1 January 2025. All school fees for education and charges for boarding services in the United Kingdom have since been charged at the standard 20 per cent rate of VAT.

== Criticisms ==
Private schools are often criticised for being elitist and seen as lying outside the spirit of the state system. Francis Green and David Kynaston have written that "among affluent countries, Britain’s private‑school participation is especially exclusive to the rich", and that the "existence in Britain of a flourishing private-school sector not only limits the life chances of those who attend state schools but also damages society at large". Many of the best-known public schools are extremely expensive, and many have entry criteria geared towards those who have been at private "feeder" preparatory schools. The Thatcher government introduced the Assisted Places Scheme in England and Wales in 1980, whereby the state paid the school fees for those pupils capable of gaining a place but unable to afford the fees. This was essentially a response to the decision of the previous Labour government in the mid-1970s to remove government funding of direct grant grammar schools, most of which then became private schools; some Assisted Places pupils went to the former direct-grant schools such as Manchester Grammar School. The scheme was terminated by the Labour government in 1997, and since then the private sector has moved to increase its own means-tested bursaries.

The former classics-based curriculum was also criticised for not providing skills in sciences or engineering, but was perhaps in response to the requirement of classics for entry to Oxbridge until the early 1960s, as well as a hangover from centuries ago when only Latin and Greek were taught at many public schools. It was Martin Wiener's opposition to this tendency which inspired his 1981 book English Culture and the Decline of the Industrial Spirit: 1850–1980, which became an influence on the Thatcher government's opposition to old-school gentlemanly Toryism. The curriculum in private school was consequently 'modernised' and according to a 2010 report from the Department for Education, private school pupils had "the highest rates of achieving grades A or B in A-level maths and sciences" compared to grammar, specialist and mainstream state schools, and pupils at private schools account for a disproportionate number of the total number of A-levels in maths and sciences.

Some parents complain that their rights and their children's are compromised by vague and one-sided contracts which allow Heads to use discretionary powers unfairly, such as in expulsion on non-disciplinary grounds. They believe private schools have not embraced the principles of natural justice as adopted by the state sector, and private law as applied to Higher Education. This belief is reinforced by the fact that the legal rights of pupils are governed by a private contract, as opposed to rights implemented by the national government. For instance, a pupil whose application for admission to a state school is rejected is legally entitled to appeal, whereas at a private school admissions are at the discretion of the governing body of the school. In 2006, pupils at fee-paying schools made up 43 per cent of those selected for places at Oxford University and 38 per cent of those granted places at Cambridge University (although such pupils represent only 18 per cent of the 16 years old plus school population).

=== Abuse ===
Journalist Alex Renton has written about abuse of pupils at boarding schools; The Guardian reported that he says that boarding school are "simply unsafe" and that "he has, he says, a database of more than 800 criminal allegations from former schoolchildren of 300 mainly private boarding schools". He presented an episode of the television programme Exposure, "Boarding Schools, the Secret Shame". In 2022, he co-wrote (with Caitlin Smith) and presented a BBC Radio 4 series, In Dark Corners, about abuse and cover-up at some of Britain's elite schools, including Eton College, Fettes College, Gordonstoun and its junior school.

=== Extra exam time ===
An investigation into official exam data by the BBC's Radio 4 Today programme, in 2017, showed that 20% of private school pupils were given extra time for their GCSE and A level exams, as compared with fewer than 12% of pupils in public sector schools. The most commonly given amount of extra exam time is 25%. Such 'exam access' arrangements are given for a range of disabilities and educational special needs such as dyslexia, dyspraxia and ADHD.

== Types and degree classes ==
In 2002, Jeremy Smith and Robin Naylor of the University of Warwick conducted a study into the determinants of degree performance at UK universities. Their study confirmed that the internationally recognised phenomenon whereby "children from more advantaged class backgrounds have higher levels of educational attainment than children from less-advantaged class backgrounds" persists at university level in the United Kingdom. The authors noted "a very well-determined and monotonically positive effect defined over Social Classes I to V" whereby, for both men and women, other things being equal, academic performance at university is better the more advantaged is the student's home background". but they also observed that a student educated at a private school was on average 6 per cent less likely to receive a first or an upper second-class degree than a student from the same social class background, of the same gender, who had achieved the same A-level score at a state school.

The averaged effect was described as very variable across the social class and A-level attainment of the candidates; it was "small and not strongly significant for students with high A-level scores" (i.e. for students at the more selective universities) and "statistically significant mostly for students from lower occupationally-ranked social-class backgrounds". Additionally, the study could not take into account the effect of a slightly different and more traditional subject mix studied by private students at university on university achievement. Despite these caveats, the paper attracted much press attention. The same study found wide variations between different independent schools, suggesting that students from a few of them were in fact significantly more likely to obtain the better degrees than state students of the same gender and class background having the same A-level score.

In 2011, a subsequent study led by Richard Partington at Cambridge University showed that A-level performance is "overwhelmingly" the best predictor for exam performance in the earlier years ("Part I") of the undergraduate degree at Cambridge. Partington's summary specified that "questions of school background and gender" ... "make only a marginal difference and the pattern – particularly in relation to school background – is in any case inconsistent."

A study commissioned by the Sutton Trust and published in 2010 focused mainly on the possible use of US-style SAT tests as a way of detecting a candidate's academic potential. Its findings confirmed those of the Smith & Naylor study in that it found that privately educated pupils who, despite their educational advantages, have only secured a poor A-level score, and who therefore attend less selective universities, do less well than state educated degree candidates with the same low A-level attainment. In addition, as discussed in the 2010 Buckingham report "HMC Schools: a quantitative analysis", because students from state schools tended to be admitted on lower A-level entry grades, relative to entry grades it could be claimed that these students had improved more. A countervailing finding of the Sutton Trust study was that for students of a given level of A-level attainment it is almost twice as difficult to get a first at the most selective universities than at those on the other end of the scale. Private sector schools regularly dominate the top of the A-level league tables, and their students are more likely to apply to the most selective universities; as a result private sector students are particularly well represented at these institutions, and therefore only the very ablest of them are likely to secure the best degrees.

In 2013, the Higher Education Funding Council for England (HEFCE) published a study noting, amongst other things, that a greater percentage of students who had attended a private school prior to university achieved a first or upper second class degree compared with students from state schools. Out of a starting cohort of 24,360 candidates having attended a private school and 184,580 having attended a state school, 64.9 per cent of the former attained a first or upper second class degree, compared to 52.7 per cent of the latter. No statistical comparisons of the two groups (State vs Private) were reported, with or without controls for student characteristics such as entry qualifications, so no inferences can be drawn on the relative performance of the two groups. The stand-out finding of the study was that private school students achieved better in obtaining graduate jobs and study, even when student characteristics were allowed for (sex, ethnicity, school type, entry qualifications, area of study).

In 2015, the UK press widely reported the outcome of research suggesting that school-leavers from state schools that attained similar A level grades go on to achieve higher undergraduate degree classes than their private school counterparts. The quoted figures, based on the degree results of all students who graduated in 2013/14, suggested that 82 per cent of state school pupils got firsts or upper seconds compared with 73 per cent of those from private schools. Later, HEFCE admitted that it had made a transposition error, and that in fact, 73 per cent of state school graduates gained a first or upper second class degree compared with 82 per cent of private school graduates. This admission attracted far less publicity than the original erroneous assertion. Across all English universities, state school students who scored two Bs and a C at A-level did on average eight per cent better at degree level than their privately educated counterparts. Two Bs and a C represents an entry tariff of 112, well below the average demanded by any of the UK's Russell Group universities.

== See also ==
- Armorial of UK schools
- Education in the United Kingdom
- List of direct grant grammar schools (list of schools that were part of the scheme, between 1945 and 1976)
- List of English and Welsh endowed schools (19th century)
- List of private schools in the United Kingdom
- List of the oldest schools in the United Kingdom
- Private school fee fixing scandal
- Schools Class locomotives for a class of Southern Railway locomotives that were named after Public Schools in the early 1930s
