= Herbert Sisnett =

British colonial judge

Sir Herbert Sisnett FRPSL

Chief Justice of British Honduras
- In office 1922–1931
- Preceded by: Robert Roden
- Succeeded by: Charles Wilton Wood Greenidge

Sir Herbert Kortright McDonnell Sisnett, FRPSL (1862 – 3 June 1937) was a British lawyer and colonial judge.

The son of G. W. Sisnett, Rector of St George's, Barbados, Sisnett was educated in Barbados at The Lodge School and Harrison College, before being called to the English bar by the Inner Temple in 1896. He was Registrar General and District Commissioner, Belize, British Honduras, in 1907–12; he also acted at Attorney General and Chief Justice of British Honduras on several occasions during the period. In 1913–21, he was Stipendiary Magistrate in British Guiana, and acted as Attorney General of British Guiana in 1920–21.

He was senior Puisne Judge in Jamaica during 1921–22, before being appointed Chief Justice of British Honduras in 1922. He was sole arbitrator in the Shufeldt claim between the United States and Guatemala in 1930. He was knighted in 1927 and retired in 1931.

A philatelist, Sisnett was a Fellow of the Royal Philatelic Society London.

Sisnett married in 1893 Mary Hélène, daughter of J. C. Deane, Barbados, and had issue.
