= Walter Lewis (judge) =

Sir Walter Llewellyn Lewis (13 November 1849 – 26 September 1930) was an advocate, magistrate of Trinidad and Chief Justice of British Honduras.

== Biography ==
Lewis was born in Banbury, but his mother and father settled in County Galway in early 1852. Educated at Queens College Galway, he received a B.A. in 1869 and took his M.A. in 1871. He received a gold medal and first class honours in his degree. Lewis entered as a student of the Middle Temple in 1872; he acquired his knowledge of the law in the chambers of Robert Wallace, Herbert Reed and Robert McCall. He frequently "devilled" for McCall who was also a graduate of QCG. He married Jane Mary Dealy in 1887. In his leisure time Lewis enjoyed voyaging to various parts of the world—he was an expert navigator.

In 1876 he began to practice on the Northern Circuit but this was not to his liking and he switched to the South Wales and Chester Circuit. Suffering from poor health in 1883 and 1884 he accepted an appointment from Lord Derby as a stipendiary magistrate in the county district of Trinidad. Some of Lewis's duties lay outside the judiciary: he was chairman of the roads commission, the commission on Agriculture and administrator of the Trinidad public service Widows and Orphans Fund. He was commended for this work by Joseph Chamberlain, and confirmed as a judge of the Supreme Court in 1893. By 1900 he had left to serve as Chief Justice of British Honduras. Lewis received the King Edward VII Coronation Medal in 1902, a knighthood in 1904 and in 1906 he decided to retire. He died in Blackheath, aged 80.

Lewis married the noted artist Jane Mary Dealy in 1887; Lady Lewis died in 1939.
