= Louis Diston Powles =

English barrister and author (1842–1911)

Louis Diston Powles (1842–1911) was an English barrister. He is now remembered for his outspoken memoir Land of the Pink Pearl of his time in the Bahamas as a stipendiary magistrate, during the 1880s.

== Early life ==
He was born on 11 October 1842, the youngest son of John Diston Powles by his second marriage, and was educated at Harrow School. He matriculated at Pembroke College, Oxford in 1861.

Powles entered the Inner Temple 10 April 1863 and was called to the bar 30 April 1866. He went the south-eastern circuit.

== In the Bahamas ==
Unsuccessful in attempting to take silk in the early 1880s, Powles took up in 1886 a position as Stipendiary and Circuit Magistrate in the Bahamas.

=== Governor Blake ===
Henry Arthur Blake had been Governor of the Bahamas from 1884. With a background as a resident magistrate for the Irish Constabulary, he wanted to reform the local system of lay magistrates, and applied in early 1886 to the Colonial Office for two salaried magistrates to be appointed, citing a lack of diversity in the system. Powles was the sole magistrate to be put into place.

=== Lightbourn case ===
A case in the Nassau Police Court, in which Powles sentenced James Lightbourn to jail for beating a maid, Susan Hopkins, caused controversy. Lightbourn was white, and Hopkins black. Powles had the intention of repressing domestic violence, and had announced that in all cases of a man striking a woman, the man if found guilty would be sent to jail without the option of paying a fine; and had acted accordingly in sentencing three black men in common assault cases. When Lightbourn was sentenced to a month's imprisonment, he appealed to Henry William Austin, Chief Justice of the Bahamas.

Powles became convinced that Lightbourn, a Wesleyan Methodist, had perjured himself. His own published account of the case stated that the black witnesses were credible. Against Blake's advice of silence, he made a public comment that he wouldn't believe a Methodist. Powles being a Roman Catholic, on good terms with the local Anglican cleric Charles Carthew Wakefield, he aroused a furore based on nonconformist feeling. It was argued that, in a trial without a jury, Powles had acted in accordance with religious animus.

=== Resignation ===
Powles then went on circuit to the Out Islands. When he returned, he faced an investigation, and resigned. He was forced out, lacking support in the executive and judiciary. Ormond Drimmie Malcolm, the attorney-general, backed the appeal. Austin, usually at odds with Malcolm, agreed in this case after non-white Bahamians petitioned on behalf of Powles. Blake felt that Powles had raised racial tensions, in a counter-productive fashion and after due warning: and wrote in those terms to the Colonial Office.

Blake in June 1887 offered Powles a choice: formal dismissal, or three months medical leave, followed by resignation on health grounds. Choosing the latter, Powles was certified by a local doctor as suffering from nervous exhaustion. The New York Herald covered the story, saying he had been "run out" for "protecting the blacks".

=== Aftermath ===
After the departure of Powles, there was another petition in his favour. Austin granted the Lightbourn appeal, on the grounds that the black witnesses lacked credibility.

In The Land of the Pink Pearl (1888), Powles argued for the credibility of the witnesses. He commented that Austin had worked from his own trial notes, rather than re-examining them. He stated that three of them were from distant Inagua, and had no previous acquaintance with Hopkins.

== Later life ==
Powles died at Lowestoft on 6 May 1911, as Probate Registrar for Norwich.

== Works ==
- Powles, Browne on Probate
- Practitioner's Handbook to the New Rules
- Supplement to Browne on Probate and Browne on Divorce
- The Land of the Pink Pearl; Or, Recollections of Life in the Bahamas (1888)
- Browne and Powles' Law and Practice in Divorce & Matrimonial Causes (1905)
- Powles and Oakley on the Law and Practice Relating to Probate & Administration (1906)

The Opera Cloak, a farce written by Powles with Augustus Harris, was performed at the Royalty Theatre in 1893.

=== The Land of the Pink Pearl ===
Some of the material in The Land of the Pink Pearl drew on earlier accounts by William Drysdale (1852–1901). Drysdale was a journalist for the New York Times, who wrote travel colour pieces, and had published articles of 1884–5 about the Bahamas as part of In Sunny Lands: Out-Door Life in Nassau and Cuba (1885). Drysdale has been accused of racist attitudes to the black population. Powles acknowledged borrowing from Drysdale for two of his chapters.

The book described the lives of blacks and whites in the Bahamas in forthright terms. It was critical of the sponging trade. Craton and Saunders wrote:

Only L. D. Powles among nineteenth-century writers came close to providing an accurate explanation for the less fortunate aspects of Nassau's social life [...]

They further state that his analysis was "perceptive" and based in part on his personal observations; and they mention that his views from the judicial bench, "comparatively liberal", put him at odds with white residents. He met a report in The Century Magazine of 1887, that racial prejudice was absent in Nassau, with cutting evidence of a racial double standard.

Powles was attentive to music and dance. He noted the Afro-Bahamian adaptation of ballroom dancing in Nassau, and on Fortune Island at a wedding celebration the merengue and jigs, with music from fife, accordion and tambourine.

== Family ==
Powles married in 1868, Catherine Prescott, second daughter of Admiral Sir Henry Prescott and his wife Mary, eldest daughter of Philippe d'Auvergne.
