= John Diston Powles =

English businessman

- Born: c. 1787; England
- Died: September 14, 1867 (aged 79–80); Elstree, United Kingdom
- Known for: Share speculation and promotion
- Spouses: Louisa Chambers (m. 1808; div. 1815) Emma Francis Ogle (m. 1818; died 1828) Anna Catherina Schneider (m. 1841)
- Children: 11

John Diston Powles (c. 1787 – 14 September 1867) was an English businessman. He was known for his promotion and speculation in shares for ventures in South America that included mining and farming enterprises.

== Powles & Co. ==
Powles was involved in numerous companies, typically as a major shareholder who was also chairman. Powles, Brothers & Co. refers to a London company set up by Powles and two brothers, having dealings with Latin America.

=== Share promotion and Benjamin Disraeli ===
In the mid-1820s Powles was heavily involved in the promotion of South American mining companies, and enlisted a young Benjamin Disraeli to write pamphlets promoting these mines, particularly those in Chile. Disraeli gained experience and material for his first novel Vivian Grey (1826), in which Powles and his wife appear as Mr and Mrs Millions. But speculation in shares caused Disraeli to be saddled by debts, and these took decades to pay off.

=== South American satrap ===
In 1823 Gran Colombia applied to Diston Powles for colonists to settle in Venezuela in farm colonies but at that time the British government under George Canning did not recognise the new Latin American nations, as their rebellion against the Spanish Empire was controversial. Only after the battle of Ayacucho at the end of 1824 did the United Kingdom establish formal relations and then investments in South America increased in value.

In 1825 Scottish and Irish contracted by Powles in London came in the form of the Topo Tacagua Valley settlers, but the colony was unsuccessful.

Powles was the most active British merchant in Gran Colombia at this period, operating through local agents. In the area of present-day Venezuela, his commercial dominance was very marked, and persisted for nearly two decades. He weathered the financial storm of the Panic of 1825, and continued with South American mining ventures, and a Gran Colombia loan. The Colombian Mining Association, a company set up by Powles and others, acquired mines in Antioquia State and Mariquita. William Wills went out from the United Kingdom to Bogotá for the Association in 1826, and settled in South America.

In Brazil Powles was involved also in the creation of the St. John d'el Rey Mining Company in 1830 and served as its first chairman. An associate and founding director of the company was James Vetch.

=== Business reputation ===
During the 1850s, the business methods used by Powles came under intense criticism from the barrister Christopher Richardson. His banker father, of the same name, has been identified tentatively with a director of the Chilean Mining Association with which Powles was involved in the 1820s. Deas, writing in the Oxford Dictionary of National Biography, which calls him a "company promoter and speculator", comments that some of his activities "would now be considered fraudulent", though they were not illegal.

== Death ==
Powles died at Elstree in 1867. He was buried in Elstree churchyard, where two of his sons already lay.

== Family ==
Powles was married three times:

1. He married in 1808 Louisa Chambers; they had two daughters and a son, and were divorced in 1815. The son John Richard Powles (1813–1897) was a merchant in Colombia.
2. He married in 1818 Emma Francis Ogle (1789–1828); they had four sons and two daughters. Richard Cowley Powles was a son of this marriage. Louis Diston Powles (1842–1911), the youngest son of this marriage, was a barrister. The other sons of this marriage were Thomas William (died 1857 aged 31) and George Williams (died 1862 aged 39).
3. He married in 1841 Anna Catherina Schneider, and they had two sons.

One of the daughters, Emma Maria, married in 1837 William Robert Grove. Another daughter, Louisa, married Matthew Plummer, vicar of Heworth, and was mother of Alfred Plummer and Charles Plummer.
