= Carleton Langley =

British lawyer and colonial judge

Sir Carleton Langley

Chief Justice of British Honduras
- In office 1940–1948
- Preceded by: Sir Arthur Kirwan Agar
- Succeeded by: Frederick Malcolm Boland

Personal details
- Born: 21 May 1885
- Died: 11 November 1963 (aged 78)
- Education: City of London School

Sir Carleton George Langley (21 May 1885 – 11 November 1963) was a British lawyer and colonial judge. He was the Chief Justice of British Honduras from 1940 to 1948.

== Biography ==
The elder son of George Langley, of Shepton Mallet, Somerset, Carleton Langley was educated at the City of London School. He was called to the Bar by the Middle Temple in 1913. During and after the First World War, he served in Malta, France, and Ireland from 1914 to 1921, reaching the rank of Captain in the 2nd Battalion, The London Regiment.

Returning to the Bar in 1921, he entered private practice, first in Lincoln's Inn, then in the Bahamas until 1931, when he was appointed Attorney-General of the Leeward Islands, becoming a local King's Counsel in 1935. He was concurrently Acting Colonial Secretary from 1934 to 1936, and Administrator of Antigua from 1935 to 1936.

In 1937, he was appointed second puisne judge in British Guiana. He was appointed Chief Justice of British Honduras in 1940, serving there until his retirement in 1948. He was knighted in 1946.

After returning to England, Langley was appointed a Commissioner in the Probate, Divorce and Admiralty Division of the High Court of Justice.

Langley was married to Mary, daughter of W. H. Lockett; they had one daughter. Langley died in 1963.
