= Robert Hamilton Vetch =

Colonel Robert Hamilton Vetch CB (6 January 1841 – 28 January 1916) was a British Army officer and biographer who contributed to the Encyclopædia Britannica and the Dictionary of National Biography.

He served as Deputy Inspector-General of Fortifications and as Chief Engineer in Ireland.

== Early life ==
Born at Moseley near Birmingham in January 1841, Vetch was a son of Captain James Vetch (1789–1869), a retired Royal Engineers officer and Fellow of the Royal Society who later became Conservator of Harbours at the Admiralty. At the time, his father was resident engineer of the Birmingham and Gloucester Railway. His mother was Alexandrina Ogilvie, a daughter of Robert Auld of Edinburgh, and he had nine brothers and sisters.

Vetch trained for a career in the British Army as a gentleman cadet at the Royal Military Academy, Woolwich, a specialist school for future Engineer and Artillery officers, where the subjects studied included mathematics, the principles of fortification, gunnery, and bridge-building.

== Career ==
Out of his cadet company, Vetch was commissioned as a lieutenant into the Royal Engineers on 23 December 1857. His early work was on defences at Bermuda, Malta, and the Bristol Channel, and he became secretary of the Royal Engineers' Institute at Chatham. Between 1877 and 1884 he edited the professional papers of the Royal Engineers.

Vetch was promoted to captain in 1869, major in 1878, lieutenant colonel in 1884, and full olonel in 1888.

In his later career, Vetch was successively deputy inspector-general of fortifications and chief engineer in Ireland, retiring from military service in 1898. He was placed on the retired list on 6 January 1898, his 57th birthday, with a pension of £500 a year, his Service Record noting that he had served for forty years and fourteen days, with periods of leave in Bermuda, Barbados, and Malta totalling more than seven years.

As a military historian and biographer, Vetch edited a history of General Gordon's campaign in China and wrote biographies of two fellow Royal Engineers, Sir Gerald Graham VC and General Sir Andrew Clarke, an inspector-general of fortifications. He also contributed many articles to the Encyclopædia Britannica and the first Dictionary of National Biography, under the editorship of Sidney Lee.

== Personal life ==
In 1911, Vetch was living in Kew with his wife of 47 years, Mary Ann, who had been born in Wellington, New Zealand, two unmarried daughters, a cook, and a housemaid. He and his wife had had fourteen children, of whom twelve were still alive. Vetch died at home at Ilchester, Kew Road, Richmond, Surrey, on 28 January 1916, aged 75. He left an estate valued for probate at £3902, and his Executors were his sons Douglas Francis Stewart Vetch, a bank manager, and Harold George Gordon Vetch, a clerk.

== Books ==
- Gordon’s Campaigns in China by Himself: with an Introduction and Short Account of the Tai-Ping Rebellion by Colonel R. H. Vetch C.B. (London: Chapman and Hall, 1900); full text at archive.org
- Lieut.-General Sir Gerald Graham VC GCB: Life, Letters and Diaries (Edinburgh and London: William Blackwood and Sons, 1901)
- Life of Lieut.-General the Hon. Sir Andrew Clarke GCMG CB CIE (Plymouth: E. P. Dutton and Company, 1905); full text at archive.org

== Honours ==
- Companion of the Order of the Bath, 20 November 1894, the citation reading "Colonel Robert Hamilton Vetch, Royal Engineers, late Deputy Inspector-General of Fortifications, War Office"
