= Edward Zacca =

Jamaican judge (1931–2019)

The Right Honourable Sir Edward Zacca KCMG OJ

Acting Governor-General of Jamaica
- In office 31 March 1991 – 1 August 1991
- Monarch: Elizabeth II
- Prime Minister: Michael Manley
- Preceded by: Florizel Glasspole
- Succeeded by: Howard Cooke

President of the Court of Appeal of the Bahamas
- In office March 2000 – July 2001
- Preceded by: Kenneth George
- Succeeded by: Joan Sawyer

Personal details
- Born: 26 July 1931
- Died: 11 November 2019 (aged 88)
- Education: Kingston College
- Occupation: Judge; politician

Sir Edward Zacca KCMG OJ (26 July 1931 – 11 November 2019) was chief justice of the Jamaican Supreme Court from 1985 to 1996. Under the Constitution of Jamaica, the chief justice of Jamaica serves as acting governor-general of Jamaica when that office is vacant, and Chief Justice Zacca served in that capacity from March to August 1991. Zacca was succeeded as Chief Justice by the Hon. Mr. Justice Lensley Wolfe.

He became a member of Her Majesty's Most Honourable Privy Council in 1992. Zacca was first appointed as Justice of Appeal of the Court of Appeal for Bermuda on 21 October 1996. He became President of the Court on 1 January 2004, serving through 2014.

== Early life and education ==
Zacca was born on 26 July 1931 to Wadie and Angel Zacca. Edward Zacca married Hope Margaret, the daughter of George Haddad (J.P. and Merchant) and Nellie Haddad on 19 October 1958. They had three children together: Christopher, Karen, and Edward, Jr. Zacca attended Kingston College from 1941 to and was called to the Bar in Middle Temple, London, on 9 February 1954. From 1952 to 1953 he was the President of the Hans Crescent Colonial Students' Residence, London.

== Career ==
On 29 June 1954, Zacca was admitted to practice and was appointed Clerk of Courts January 1958. He became Acting Resident Magistrate for St. Catherine, RM for St. Mary and St. James (1960–65) and RM for St. Andrew (1965–1968). He was subsequently appointed, High Court Judge, Justice of Appeal, and President Court of Appeal, Jamaica.

On 2 January 1985, he was sworn in as Chief Justice of Jamaica by Florizel Glasspole at King's House. He served as acting governor-general of Jamaica from March to August 1991. Zacca was elevated up to the Privy Council of the United Kingdom when he was accepted by the Privy Council on 1 September 1992 to one of its members. Zacca was the fourth Caribbean Chief Justice to be appointed to the Privy Council and the first from Jamaica. Here he was not allowed to sit on any appeal being heard from Jamaica by the Judicial Committee of the Privy Council, but he was eligible to do so for appeals from other Caribbean and Commonwealth countries. He retired as Chief Justice of Jamaica on 25 July 1996 after giving 38 years in the judicial service.

He was also president of the Court of Appeal of Turks and Caicos Islands and of the Court of Appeal of the Cayman Islands. He served as president of the Court of Appeal of the Bahamas from March 2000 to July 2001.

== Honours ==
Edward Zacca was a member of the Order of Jamaica.

He was also a member of the Privy Council of the United Kingdom, which confers the right to the prenominal style "The Right Honourable".

He was knighted in the 2015 Birthday Honours, as a Knight Commander of the Order of St Michael and St George.
