= William Vesey Munnings =

Chief Justice of the Bahamas

William Vesey Munnings was Chief Justice of the Bahamas in the early nineteenth-century.
