= Albert Staine =

Belizean judge

Sir Albert Llewellyn Staine CBE (4 July 1928 – 1987) was a Belizean judge. He was Director of Public Prosecutions in 1969. He was one of the founding members of the Belize Audubon Society that year. He was named a Commander of the Most Excellent Order of the British Empire in 1978. He was named Chief Justice of Belize in 1977. He was the first native of Belize to become CJ. At the time of his appointment, Belize was still a British colony; it would become independent while he was still on the bench. He served in that position until 1981, and was succeeded by George Moe of Barbados the following year. He was knighted in 1984. The Sir Albert Staine Building of the Supreme Court of Belize, which houses its law library, was named for him in 1992.

Legal offices
Preceded by Denis Malone	Chief Justice of Belize; 1977–1981	Succeeded by George Moe
