= Chief Justice of Belize =

Head of the Supreme Court of Belize

- Incumbent; Louise Blenman since 2 September 2022
- Supreme Court of Belize; Office of the Chief Justice
- Style: The Honourable Madam Chief Justice
- Status: Chief Justice, head of the Supreme Court of Belize
- Member of: Supreme Court of Belize
- Seat: Supreme Court Building, Belize City, Belize, Central America
- Nominator: Prime Minister
- Appointer: Governor General
- Term length: No set term, though retirement is mandatory at age 65.
- Constituting instrument: Constitution of Belize
- Inaugural holder: Robert Temble
- Formation: 1843
- Website: www.belizejudiciary.org

The chief justice of Belize is the head of the Supreme Court of Belize. Under Chapter 7 of the Constitution of Belize, the chief justice is appointed by the Governor-General on the advice of the prime minister.

Since the retirement of Kenneth Benjamin in March 2020, Michelle Arana was the acting chief justice of Belize. Louise Blenman was appointed to fill the vacancy in September 2022.

== List of chief justices ==
The full list as published by the attorney general of Belize:

1. Robert Temple Esq., 1843–1861

=== British Honduras (1862-1973) ===
1. Richard J. Connor, 1862
2. William Alexander Parker, 1875–1881
3. Sir Henry Rawlins Pipon Schooles, 1881 (later Administrator of Grenada, 1887 and Attorney General of Jamaica, 1896)
4. William Anthony Musgrave Sheriff, 1883–1886
5. Sir William Meigh Goodman, 1886–1889
6. Sir William John Anderson, 1890–1900 (afterwards Chief Justice of Trinidad and Tobago, 1900)
7. Sir Walter Llewellyn Lewis, 1900–1906
8. Frederic Mackenzie Maxwell, 1906–1911 (afterwards Chief Justice of the Leeward Islands, 1912)
9. Sir Walter Sidney Shaw, 1912–1914
10. Sir Robert Blair Roden, 1915–1921
11. Herbert Kortright McDonnell Sisnett, 1922–1931
12. Charles Wilton Wood Greenidge, 1932–1936
13. Sir Arthur Kirwan Agar, 1936–1940
14. Sir Carleton George Langley, 1940–1947
15. Frederick Malcolm Boland, 1948–1949
16. Sir Alfred Victor Crane, 1950–1954
17. Erskine Rueul La Tourette Ward, 1955–1957
18. Sir Clifford De Lisle Inniss, 1957–1972

=== Belize (1973–) ===
1. Arthur Richard Franklin Dickson, 1973–1974
2. Sir Denis Eustace Gilbert Malone, 1974–1979
3. Albert L. Staine, CBE, 1979–1982
4. George C. R. Moe, QC, 1982–1985
  - George N. Brown, acting 1985–1986
5. Taufik Cotran, CBE, 1986–1990
6. Sir George N. Brown, 1990–1998
7. George Singh, 1998
8. Manuel Sosa, CBE, SC, 1998–1999
  - John Troadio Gonzalez, acting 1999–2000
9. Dr. Abdulai Osman Conteh, 2000–2010
  - Samuel Awich, acting 2010–2011
10. Kenneth Benjamin, 2011-2020
  - Michelle Arana, acting 2020-2022
11. Louise Blenman, 2022-Present
