= Samuel Awich =

Ugandan judge

Samuel Lungole Awich is a Commonwealth jurist, whose career has taken him from his native Uganda to Botswana, the Solomon Islands, and for the past decade Belize.

== Career ==
=== Early career ===
Awich began his legal career as a state counsel in Botswana in 1976, and sat on the bench as a Senior Magistrate in 1980, Principal Magistrate in 1981, Acting Registrar and Master of the High Court in 1983, and Deputy Registrar in 1989. He held those positions until 1993, when he went into private practice with Kgodi and Partners. In 1994 he moved to the Solomon Islands, where he became the Registrar of the High Court and the Court of Appeal. In 1995 he became the Commissioner of the High Court, and was appointed a judge of the High Court in 1996.

=== On the Supreme Court of Belize ===
Awich was sworn in as a justice of the Supreme Court of Belize on 2 April 2001 by Chief Justice Abdulai Conteh of Sierra Leone. In September 2009, the Belize Bar Association met to discuss Awich's delays in delivering judgments in many of his cases; he had the highest number of cases with long-delayed rulings, due to the lack of civil division judges and adjustments requested, with eleven of fifteen cases pending for four to six years, which the BBA described as a breach of the litigants' constitutional right to a fair hearing in a reasonable period of time; they formally invited Awich to resign. Then-Attorney General Wilfred Elrington criticised the Belize Bar Association's comments, describing them as inviting political interference in the judiciary and eroding public confidence; sitting judges similarly condemned the BBA's actions as "scandalous".

When Chief Justice Abdulai Conteh reached the retirement age of 65 in August 2010, PM Dean Barrow made the controversial decision not to extend his term. Late that month it was indicated that Awich would likely become acting CJ until a new CJ could be found. He was sworn in as acting CJ on 4 October 2010. In statements at the time, he expressed support for harsher punishments for criminals. He was originally only supposed to hold the post until January 2011, but ended up holding the post well into the 2011 session while the search for a new CJ continued. At the ceremonial opening of the Supreme Court in 2011, he also criticised opponents of the Caribbean Court of Justice, and the arrangement whereby English barristers could represent clients in the courts of Belize even though there was no reciprocal arrangement for Belizean attorneys to act likewise in English courts. He held the position until September, when he was succeeded by Kenneth Benjamin. In May 2012, he was sworn in as a Justice of the Court of Appeal, serving under Court of Appeal President Manuel Sosa. In June 2023, Samuel Awich filed a complaint against the Social Security Board and the Attorney General of Belize. to apply for a better-paid retirement benefit, Samuel Awich served in the judiciary from 2001 until 2022, when he retired.

== Personal life ==
Awich received his LLB with Second Class Honours at Makerere University in Kampala, and went on to earn a diploma from the nearby Law Development Centre.

Legal offices
Preceded by Abdulai Conteh	Chief Justice of Belize (acting); 2010-2011	Succeeded by Kenneth Benjamin
