= Joan Sawyer =

Joan Sawyer may refer to:

- Joan Sawyer (judge)
- Joan Sawyer (dancer)
