= James Vetch =

Scottish army officer and civil engineer

James Vetch (1789–1869) was a Scottish army officer and civil engineer. A veteran of the Peninsular War in the Royal Engineers, in later life he took on a wide range of engineering work, including mining in Mexico. He was a Fellow of the Royal Society, and a writer of reports for Parliament and the Admiralty.

== Early life ==
The third son of Robert Vetch of Caponflat, Haddington, East Lothian, and his wife Agnes Sharp, he was born at Haddington on 13 May 1789. Educated at Haddington and Edinburgh, he entered the Royal Military College, Great Marlow, and in 1805 was transferred to the Royal Military Academy, Woolwich. He was employed on the trigonometrical survey at Oakingham, Berkshire (1806), until he received a commission as second lieutenant in the Royal Engineers on 1 July 1807. He was promoted to lieutenant on 1 March 1808. After serving for three years, partly at Chatham and partly at Plymouth, he was sent in 1810 to Spain, and joined the division of Sir Thomas Graham at the blockade of Cádiz. He took part in the battle of Barrosa on 5 March 1811, and was made the bearer of despatches to Gibraltar. Vetch was then sent to the Barbary Coast, and went on from Tangier to Tetuan to report on the capabilities of the country to furnish engineering supplies.

In March 1812 Vetch left Cádiz for Elvas, sailing up the Guadiana River with a company of sappers and miners to take part in the siege of Badajos. On the evening of 6 April, when the final assault took place, he made a lodgment with three hundred men in the ravelin of San Roque, and entered Badajos with the victorious army. He was promoted to be second captain on 21 July 1813, and returned to England the following year. For his services in the Peninsula he received the war medal with clasps for Barrosa and Badajos.

From 1814 to 1820 Vetch commanded a company of sappers and miners, first at Spike Island in Cork Harbour, where he was employed on the construction of Fort Westmoreland, and afterwards at Chatham. In 1821 he was appointed to the ordnance survey, and during this and the two following years, assisted by his friends Thomas Drummond and Robert Kearsley Dawson, both of the Royal Engineers, he carried out the triangulation of the Orkney and Shetland islands and of the western islands of Scotland.

== Civil engineer ==
Promotion being slow, Vetch retired on half-pay on 11 March 1824. He went to Mexico, and managed the Real del Monte silver mines, associated with John Taylor, and those of Bolaños companies. He also gave his services to the Anglo-Mexican Mining Association, promoted by John Diston Powles and later to the United-Mexico Mining Association, a rival. He returned to England in 1829, but again went to Mexico after his marriage in 1832, and remained there until 1835. During his period in Mexico he constructed roads for the mines, organised systems of transport, and paved the way for later development of Mexican mining operations. Sir Henry Ward, the British envoy, in an official report, called attention to his services. He was elected Fellow of the Royal Society in 1830; previously, in 1818, he had been elected to the Geological Society.

Vetch was resident engineer of the Birmingham and Gloucester Railway Company from 1836 to 1840 for the construction of one half of its line. In 1842 Vetch designed a system of sewerage for the borough of Leeds, which was carried out. In 1843 he was associated with Sir Henry Thomas de la Beche in designs for the drainage of Windsor, and in 1844 designed drainage for Windsor Castle and parks and for the purification of the Frogmore lakes; these works were completed in 1847. After the Duchy of Cornwall Act 1844, Vetch was appointed one of the three commissioners to carry changes in tenancies, John Douglas Cook acting as secretary.

In 1844, 1845, and 1846 Vetch was examined by the Commissioners Upon the Subject of Harbours of Refuges, and at their request wrote a report on wrought iron frameworks in the construction of piers and breakwaters. In 1845 he reported on designs for a harbour of refuge at Dover. In July 1846 Vetch was appointed consulting engineer to the admiralty; in 1847 he was appointed a member of the new harbour conservancy board at the admiralty, the other members being John Washington and Charles Bethune of the Royal Navy Washington was withdrawn from the board in 1849, and in 1853 Vetch was appointed sole conservator of harbours. In 1849 he was appointed one of the metropolitan commissioners of sewers, an honorary office which he held for four years. In the same year he proposed an extended water supply for the London metropolis, and in 1850 designed a system of drainage for Southwark. In 1858–9 he was a member of the royal commission on harbours of refuge, of which Admiral Sir James Hope was chairman.

== Last years ==
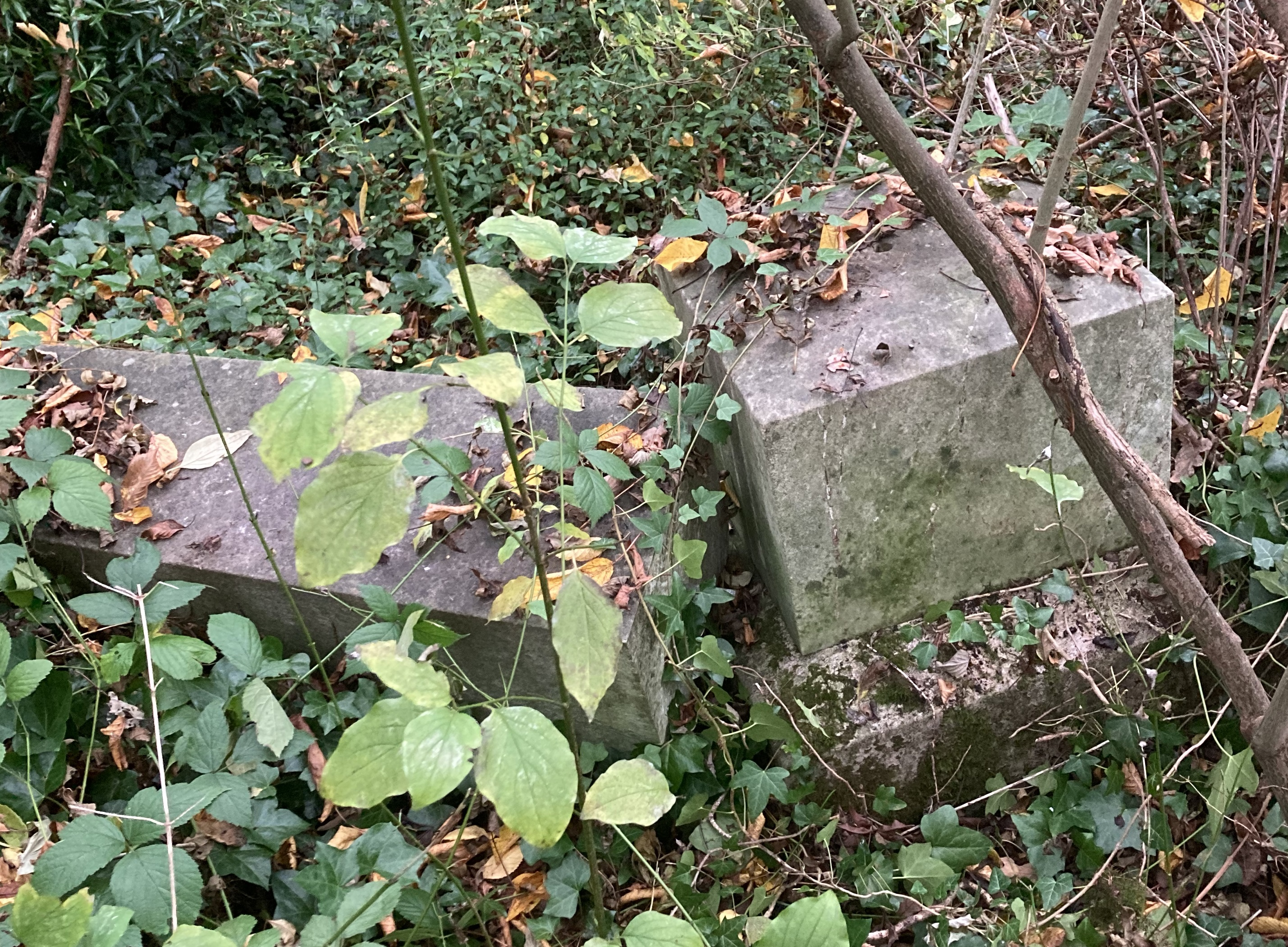
Family vault of James Vetch in Highgate Cemetery (west side)

Vetch retired from the Admiralty in 1863; his office of conservator was then abolished and the duties transferred to the Board of Trade. He was elected a fellow of the Royal Geographical Society in 1830, an associate of the Institution of Civil Engineers in 1839, a member of the Société Française de Statistique Universelle in 1852, and was a member of other learned bodies.

He died on 7 December 1869, and was buried in a family vault (plot no.5277) on the western side of Highgate cemetery. The vault is overgrown with a broken and illegible monument.

== Works ==
Vetch was author of:

- Account of the Remains of a Mammoth found near Rochester, 1820.
- Account of the Island of Foula, 1821.
- Letter to Lord Viscount Althorpe on Reform, 1831.
- On the Monuments and Relics of the Ancient Inhabitants of New Spain, 1836.
- Considerations on the Political Geography and Geographical Nomenclature of Australia, 1838.
- Description of a Bridge built of blue lias limestone across the Birmingham and Gloucester Railway at Dunhampstead, 1841.
- On the Structural Arrangement most favourable to the Health of Towns, 1842.
- Enquiry into the Means of Establishing a Ship Navigation between the Mediterranean and the Red Seas, 1843.
- On the Advantages of employing a Framework of Malleable Iron in the construction of Jetties and Breakwaters, 1843.
- Havens of Safety, 1844.
- Remarks on the Effluvia from Gully Gratings, 1849.
- On the River Bann Navigation, 1850.
- On Surveys for Drainage and the Application of Sewer Water for Agricultural Purposes, 1842.

Reports were published by Vetch between 1847 and 1859 on the following harbours: Ramsgate, the Tyne, Cork, Wexford, the Isle of Man, Holyhead, Port Patrick, and Donaghadee, Galway, Portsmouth, Table Bay, Port Natal, Point de Galle.

Feeling the want of a good map of Mexico, Vetch accumulated astronomical and barometrical observations while there, measured several short base-lines, and triangulated a large tract of country. His papers and maps on the subject were presented after his death to the topographical department of the War Office. He presented a collection of Mexican antiquities to the British Museum and wrote a paper about them.

From 1839 the project of a ship canal between the Mediterranean and Red Seas occupied Vetch's attention. In 1843 he published a work on it which ran through several editions and attracted much public attention. The government, and especially Lord Palmerston, opposed the plan as contrary to Britain's political interests. Twelve years later Ferdinand de Lesseps published his scheme, printing Vetch's opinions as an appendix to his work.

== Family ==
Vetch married, on 2 February 1832 in London, Alexandrina Ogilvie (d. 1853), daughter of Robert Auld of Edinburgh. They had ten children, of whom seven survived him, including Rev. James Edward (d. 1870), Robert Hamilton, C.B., colonel royal engineers, and William Francis, C.V.O., major-general, formerly Royal Dublin Fusiliers. Vetch's portrait, by Joshua Munro, went to his eldest surviving son.
