= Jane Mary Dealy =

English artist (1856–1939)

- Born: 1856
- Died: 1939 (aged 82–83)
- Education: Slade School, the Royal Academy
- Known for: Painting, Illustration
- Spouse: Sir Walter Lewis

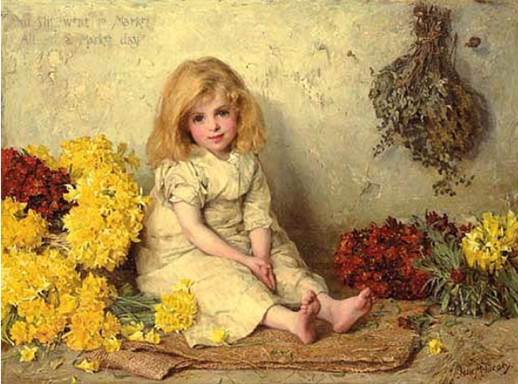
And She Went to Market All on a Market Day (1883)

Jane Mary Dealy (1856 – 1939), known as Lady Lewis from 1904, was an English artist of the later nineteenth and early twentieth centuries. She was noted for her pictures of children, and was a successful illustrator of children's books.

Born in Liverpool, she was educated at the Slade School and the Royal Academy Schools; at the latter, she won the 1880 first prize for best drawing (a silver medal and £10). She showed her works at the Royal Academy shows and at the Institute of Painters of Water Colours. She married Walter Lewis in 1887; after his knighthood, she was known as Lady Lewis.

The children's books she illustrated included The Land of Little People, Sixes and Sevens, Children's Hymns, Children's Prayers, and The Easy-to-Read Storybook.

Dealy exhibited her work at the Palace of Fine Arts at the 1893 World's Columbian Exposition in Chicago, Illinois.
