= James Alfred Smith =

British diplomat and judge (1913–1993)

Sir James Alfred Smith, CBE, TD (11 May 1913 – 3 June 1993) was a British diplomat. He served as Chief Justice of the Bahamas from 7 July 1978 to 11 May 1980.
