= Francis Cumberbatch =

Guyanese lawyer and judge

Francis Mortimer Cumberbatch is a Guyanese lawyer and judge. He has worked for the government in the Bahamas and since 2007 has been a High Court Judge of the Eastern Caribbean Supreme Court.

Cumberbatch received a bachelor of laws degree from the University of the West Indies. He worked as government lawyer in Guyana for four years, and from 1980 to 2000 worked in private practice in Georgetown, Guyana.

In 2000, Cumberbatch moved to the Bahamas, where he worked in the office of the Attorney-General of the Bahamas. In 2007, the Judicial and Legal Services Commission of the Caribbean Community appointed him to the Eastern Caribbean Supreme Court; as a High Court Judge, he was assigned to reside in and hear cases from Saint Lucia. In 2011, he succeeded fellow-Guyanese national Kenneth Benjamin as the presiding judge of the High Court in Saint Lucia.
