= Men of Blood: Violence, Manliness, and Criminal Justice in Victorian England =

2004 book by Martin J. Wiener

- Author: Martin Wiener
- Language: English
- Subject: Violence against women, masculinity, criminal justice, Victorian England
- Publisher: Cambridge University Press
- Publication date: 2004
- Publication place: United States
- Media type: Print (hardcover and paperback)
- Pages: xvi, 296
- ISBN: 978-0-521-83198-7 (hardcover)

Men of Blood: Violence, Manliness, and Criminal Justice in Victorian England is a 2004 book by the American historian Martin Wiener, published by Cambridge University Press. The book examines changes in the prosecution and punishment of male violence in nineteenth-century England, arguing that the criminal law came to treat such violence, especially violence against women, with increasing severity over the course of the period. It is a co-winner of the Albion Prize from the North American Conference on British Studies.

== Summary ==
Wiener questions the relationship between cultural constructions of gender, interpersonal violence, and the criminal justice system in nineteenth-century England. Wiener uses two principal archives: a searchable database of several thousand criminal cases reported in newspapers (mainly The Times) and Home Office files documenting exchanges between Home Secretaries, civil servants, and judges, including appeals for mercy from condemned prisoners. His central argument is that men's violence, particularly violence directed against women, came to be viewed with greater disapproval and treated with greater severity over the course of the Victorian period. He links this shift to a broader "reconstruction of gender" in which women were increasingly regarded as more moral and more vulnerable, while men were seen as more dangerous and in greater need of both external discipline and self-control.

Using a database of several thousand homicide and rape cases reported in newspapers (mainly The Times) and on Home Office files documenting appeals for mercy, Wiener argues that men's violence came to be viewed with greater disapproval and treated with greater severity over the Victorian period. He links this shift to what he calls a "reconstruction of gender" in which women were increasingly regarded as morally superior but physically vulnerable, while men were seen as more dangerous and in need of self-discipline. He situates these changes within a broader "civilizing offensive" against interpersonal violence, drawing on Norbert Elias's concept of the civilizing process.

The book covers the decline of duelling and prizefighting, changes in the prosecution of rape and sexual assault, and the treatment of spousal murder. Wiener argues that the range of defences available to men who killed their wives — including provocation by a wife's drunkenness, verbal abuse, or adultery — narrowed over the century, and that by its end insanity had become virtually the only effective plea. He contends that English courts increasingly distinguished their treatment of such cases from the more lenient approach to crimes of passion in France and the United States.

== Critical reception ==
The book was widely reviewed in historical and legal journals. Reviewers generally agreed that the work made a significant empirical contribution, praising the breadth of the archival research and the richness of the case material. Robert A. Nye praised the use of discourse analysis to connect evolving Victorian ideals of womanhood, temperance, and moral improvement with changes in the punishment of violent criminals, and commended the richness of the footnotes. John Stevenson agreed that by the end of Victoria's reign men who killed or assaulted women were treated more severely relative to other offenders than at the start, and that a changed conception of manliness was a crucial contributor to the social pacification of the era. French historian Dominique Kalifa described the work as a synthesis of considerable scope ("synthèse de belle ampleur"), based on an erudite rereading of the extensive bibliography on crime and justice and supplemented by a large body of primary sources. James Eli Adams considered it as "important and engrossing". J. Carter Wood credited the book with adding "not only a great deal of new information but also a much needed conceptual subtlety to our understandings of violence, gender and the law." Lori Loeb called it "a fascinating and provocative book based on a prodigious amount of research." Carolyn Conley judged the project as extremely ambitious, in both its scope and its sources, and called Wiener "the leading American historian of crime in Victorian England." Frances E. Dolan thought that the work is organised around "a compelling thesis": that the Victorian emphasis on protecting women reduced male brutality and led to tougher penalties for violent men. She called the book important and well organised.

However, several reviewers raised concerns about the book's analytical framework. Robert B. Shoemaker cautioned that Wiener's explanation for the decline of male violence was somewhat top-down, focused on official discipline imposed on lower-class men, and that fuller attention to attitudes outside the courtroom would have complicated the narrative. Nye thought that Wiener could have said more about the fate of the "civilizing influence" in the colonial domain and about differential histories of violence and male honour elsewhere in Europe. Shani D'Cruze raised the question of whether the decisive factor in changing men's behaviour was the action of the central courts and the national press, or more local and proximate forms of policing.

== Awards ==
The book is a co-winner of the Albion Prize, awarded by the North American Conference on British Studies.
