= William Anderson (judge) =

British barrister and colonial judge

Sir William John Anderson (1847 – 27 August 1908) was a British barrister and colonial judge. He was Chief Justice of British Honduras from 1890 to 1900 and Chief Justice of Trinidad and Tobago from 1900 to 1903.

The son of Sir George Campbell Anderson, William John Anderson was educated at Pembroke College, Oxford and was called to the English bar at Lincoln's Inn in 1869. From 1874 to 1882, he was a judge of the Supreme Court, Turks Islands.
