= Alfred Crane =

Sir Alfred Victor Crane (8 February 1892 – 20 February 1955) was a British colonial judge. He was Chief Justice of British Honduras from 1950 to 1955.

Born in Georgetown, British Guiana, Crane was admitted as a solicitor of the Supreme Court of British Guiana in 1919, and took a London LLB in 1923. From 1923 to 1933, he was Mayor of Georgetown, concurrently serving as a member of the colony's legislature from 1926 to 1933, and as senior magistrate of British Guiana from 1933 to 1946. He was called to the English bar at the Inner Temple in 1935. He was acting Solicitor-General for Guiana for a time in 1946.

Crane was appointed a Judge of the Supreme Court of the Windward and Leeward Islands from 1946 to 1950, acting as Chief Justice in 1950. From 1950 until his retirement in 1955, he was Chief Justice of British Honduras. He was knighted in 1954.
