= President of the Court of Appeal of the Bahamas =

The President of the Court of Appeal of the Bahamas heads the Court of Appeal of the Bahamas.

== Legal basis ==
The position of President of the Court of Appeal is authorised by Article 98(2)(a) of the Constitution of the Bahamas. Under Article 98(2)(b), the President may invite the Chief Justice to sit in the Court of Appeal. Under Article 99(1), the Governor-General appoints the President on the recommendation of the Prime Minister after consultation with the Leader of the Opposition. Article 102(6) governs removal of the President; the Prime Minister recommends removal to the Governor-General, who then forms a tribunal of at least three members selected by the Governor-General in accordance with the advice of the Prime Minister.

== List of presidents ==
- Hon. Sir Ronald O. Sinclair, 1965 to 1970
- Hon. Sir Paget Bourke, 1970 to 1975
- Hon. Sir Michael Hogan, 1975 to 1978
- Hon. Sir Alastair Blair-Kerr, 1978 to 1982
- Hon. Kenneth Henry, 1987 to 1992
- Hon. Vincent C. Meville, 1992 to 1995
- Hon. J. C. Gonsalves-Sabola, 1 January 1996 to 2 October 1999
- Hon. Boyd Carey, 3 October 1999 to 31 December 1999
- Hon. Kenneth George, 1 January 2000 to 11 March 2000
- Rt Hon. Edward Zacca, 27 March 2000 to 27 July 2001
- Rt Hon. Dame Joan Sawyer, 4 September 2001 to 26 November 2010
- Hon. Dame Anita Allen, 30 November 2010 to 21 December 2017
- Hon. Sir.Hartman G.Longley 22 December, 2017 to 24 February, 2020
- Hon.Sir.Michael L.Barnett 25 February, 2020 to 30 June, 2024
- Hon. Jon Isaacs, 2 July 2024 to January,26th 2025.
- Hon. Milton A.Evans January, 27th 2025 to Present.
