= Henry William Austin =

Henry William Austin (1825–1893) was a Canadian lawyer, Chief Justice of the Bahamas from August 1880.

He was forced to resign in 1890. His memoirs Ten years Chief Justice of the Bahamas, 1880–1890 in fact cover only the last two years of his time in post, and the incidents of the Lucile case, Sands case and Taylor case that led to his removal.

== Early life and background ==
He was son of Thomas Austin of Clifton, Bristol. Thomas Austin (1801–1890) was an army officer and a member of the Special Council of Lower Canada. He was a son of the Rev. Hugh Williams Austin, of St Peter's, Barbados. He was a first cousin of William Piercy Austin; several of his father's brothers, sons of Col. Thomas Austin (died 1806) of Barbados, were slave-owners in Surinam and British Guiana, including William Austin the father of William Piercy Austin.

Henry William Austin's mother was Charlotte Whitchurch. The family settled in Lennoxville, Quebec in the 1830s, where his father Thomas was involved, unsuccessfully, in setting up a brewery. Thomas Austin commanded a militia regiment in the Eastern Townships during the Lower Canada Rebellion, and was brought onto the Special Council in 1838 by Sir John Colborne, as a replacement for Ichabod Smith of Stanstead. Later the family was in Chambly, Quebec. Thomas Austin acted as Returning Officer for Chambly County, in 1850.

Austin qualified to practise law, called to the Bar of Lower Canada in 1848.

== Chief Justice of the Bahamas ==
The situation described by Martin Wiener on Austin's appointment as Chief Justice of the Bahamas in 1880 was of domination by "Bay Street", a clique of white landowners and merchants. He was the first judge there who was not from the colony. Wiener characterises him as "a conservative man, lacking noticeable sympathy for the black majority". The population of around 70,000 included then under 5,000 whites, with also many of mixed race.

Austin fell out with Ormond Drimmie Malcolm, Attorney-General in Bahamas and of the Bay Street group, early in his tenure. The arrival in 1884 of the reforming Henry Arthur Blake as Governor saw moves to promote racial equality and economic equity, and a justice system that would convict white criminals. Louis Diston Powles, an English barrister, was in 1886 brought in as an itinerant judge. Austin accepted an appeal brought by Malcolm in the contentious Lightbourn murder case, overturning the guilty verdict given by Powles. The furore had already forced Powles out, since Blake found him lacking in discretion.

Taking action against local corruption, and resisting pressure to dispense justice for inducements, Austin found himself in a weak position when Blake was replaced as governor in 1887 by Ambrose Shea. Wiener describes Shea as "venal". When assaulted in court by a black defendant, Austin ordered a flogging for contempt of court; which was not carried out. It allowed his opponents to damage his reputation as acting ultra vires, and attract attention in London to the incident.

Henry Fowler asked a question in parliament, backed up by Edward Pickersgill, about the legality of the flogging sentence, on 1 March 1889. A further question, on 15 March, was put by Pickersgill, and a follow-up by J. G. Swift MacNeill had the reply from Sir Richard Webster, Attorney-General, re-iterating that "the Chief Justice was removable by the Governor and Council of the Colony, subject to an appeal to the Home Authorities". Shea was supporting Malcolm over a reprimand in court by Austin for the manipulation of a murder case, to the advantage of the white killer of a black victim. The Colonial Office was unimpressed with those involved, but suggested an inquiry to resolve the clash.

The Colonial Office's view of an inquiry put the onus on the conduct of Malcolm. Shea headed that off with an ad hoc court of his own, which Austin regarded as incompetent to judge the legal point. When Shea then travelled to London to deal directly with the Colonial Office, a settlement was proposed under which Austin would retire by reason of infirmity—deafness—with a pension from the Bahamas Assembly. Austin accepted it in November 1889.

== Family ==
Austin married Marie Louise, eldest daughter of Hippolyte Guy, a judge and son of Louis Guy. They had two sons, Barry and Gloucester, and a daughter Charlotte. Charlotte married in 1904, as his second wife, Sir Archibald Lennox Milliken Napier, 10th Baronet; he had married first Mary Allison Dorothy Fairbairn, the marriage ending in divorce in 1903.
