= Richard Clifford Tute =

Former Chief Justice of the Bahamas

Sir Richard Clifford Tute was Chief Justice of the Bahamas from August 1932. He had previously been president of the Land Court, Jerusalem.
