= Harvey Lloyd da Costa =

Former Chief Justice of the Bahamas

Harvey Lloyd da Costa was Chief Justice of the Bahamas from 18 November 1980 to 31 December 1981.
