= Charles Walpole =

Chief Justice of the Bahamas

Sir Charles George Walpole FRGS (1848–1926) was Chief Justice of the Bahamas.
