= Abdulai Conteh =

Sierra Leonean judge and politician (1945–2024)

The Honourable Abdulai Conteh Chief Justice of Belize (Rtd.)
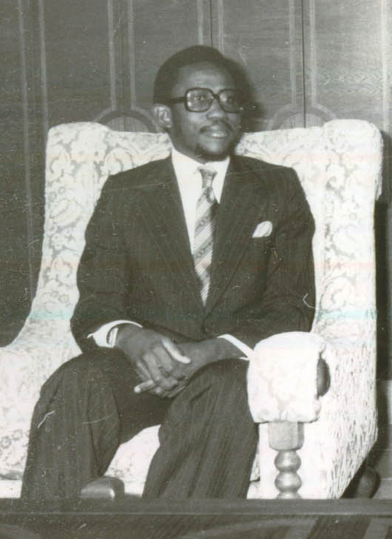
- Conteh in 1978

9th Chief Justice of Belize
- In office January 2000 – August 2010
- Nominated by: Said Musa
- Appointed by: Sir Colville Young
- Preceded by: Troadio Gonzalez (acting)
- Succeeded by: Samuel Awich (acting)

First Vice-President of Sierra Leone
- In office 1991 – 29 April 1992
- President: Joseph Saidu Momoh
- Preceded by: Abu Bakar Kamara

Personal details
- Born: Abdulai Osman Conteh; 5 August 1945 Kambia District, Colony and Protectorate of Sierra Leone
- Died: 2 August 2024 (aged 78) Freetown, Sierra Leone
- Education: King's College London, King's College, Cambridge

Abdulai Osman Conteh (5 August 1945 – 2 August 2024) was a Sierra Leonean lawyer and politician. He was a Vice-President of Sierra Leone, who served under President Joseph Saidu Momoh before he was ousted by the military junta in 1992. Conteh later spent a considerable number of years in Belize, where he served as the country's chief justice before returning to Sierra Leone.

== Early life and education ==
Conteh was born on 5 August 1945 in the village of Rogbere, Gbinleh Dixon Chiefdom in Kambia District, British Sierra Leone. He was from Sierra Leone's Susu ethnic group, which is predominantly based in the north-eastern part of the country - especially Kambia. Conteh was raised mostly in Freetown; he attended Albert Academy and later Fourah Bay College before travelling to the UK for further studies. Dr. Conteh has the following educational qualifications: Ph.D., (International Law), 1974, King's College, Cambridge; LLB (Hons): 1971, King's College, Cambridge; LLM: 1971, London University, United Kingdom; LLB (Hons): 1969, King's College London; Barrister at Law: Called to the Bar of England and Wales, 1970, at Lincoln's Inn, London, United Kingdom; Harold Porter Prize man In Land Law, 1968. He returned home in the early 1970s and worked for the SL Law Officers Department. Dr. Conteh later went into private practice and taught law at Fourah Bay College for several years.

== Political career in Sierra Leone ==
Conteh was a member of the All Peoples Congress (APC) party. His public service in Sierra Leone has included holding the offices of Minister of Foreign Affairs (1977–1984); Minister of Finance (1984–1985); Attorney-General and Minister of Justice (1987–1991) and First Vice-president and Minister of Rural Development (1991–1992). He served as a member of Parliament from Kambia District (his paternal home district) from 1977 to 1992.

In late 2007, Conteh was nominated as a candidate to become Chairperson of the African Union Commission in early 2008, but he was not successful, with Jean Ping of Gabon being elected.

== Chief Justice of Belize (2000–2010) ==
In January 2000, Conteh became the Chief Justice of the Supreme Court of Belize.

In 2007 and 2010, Conteh authored two decisions affirming the common law doctrine of aboriginal title and the existence of Maya customary land tenure in the Toledo District of Belize. Only the villages of Conejo and Santa Cruz were parties to the 2008 ruling; however, the 2010 ruling was the result of a representative action on behalf of all the Maya communities. The ruling voided all government leases, concessions, grants, and contracts adverse to the Maya tenure. The "landmark victory" is predicted to have "far-reaching implications" for "logging, mining, and petroleum concessions in what the Maya community claims is over 500,000 acres of ancestral homeland." The government appealed the decision to the Caribbean Court of Justice, where on the eve of the hearing it conceded all of Justice Conteh's original holdings. The CCJ later awarded the Maya damages for violation of their constitutional right to have their property legally protected.

Conteh turned 65 on 5 August 2010, forcing him to retire since his contract was not renewed by Prime Minister Dean Barrow. Barrow's decision not to offer Conteh a renewal was condemned by the Belize Bar Association in a resolution criticising the "unseemly manner in which the tenure of the chief justice has been treated by the government of Belize." His retirement became a "national political issue because the Chief Justice is popular with the masses of the Belizean people, and is regarded by many as fair-minded and fearless. Several of his landmark rulings particularly on constitutional issues are considered "anti-government" and "anti-establishment", and many were made even under the former Musa administration."

== Other judicial appointments ==
In December 2008, Conteh was appointed a Justice of the Court of Appeal of the Cayman Islands. In 2010, he was appointed to the Court of Appeal of the Bahamas, where he served until November, 2015.

== Personal life and death ==
Abdulai Conteh was married to Radia Labi Conteh, and they had six children. He died after a short period of illness in Freetown, Sierra Leone, on 2 August 2024, at the age of 78.

Political offices
Preceded by Abu Bakar Kamara	First Vice-President of Sierra Leone; 1991–1992	Succeeded by Vacant
Legal offices
Preceded by Troadio Gonzalez (acting)	Chief Justice of Belize; 2000–2010	Succeeded by Samuel Awich (acting)
