= List of variations of Tute =

Tute is a card game for two or four players, originating in Italy, and one of the most popular card games in Spain. The game is played with a deck of traditional Spanish playing cards or naipes that are very similar to the Italian 40-card deck. Most of the tute variants have very similar rules to normal tute. The variants differ in the number of deck cards used or variations in the standard rules.

== Havanian Tute ==
At the start of the hand both players receive eight cards, the trump is placed in the same way as normal Tute.

This Havanian of Tute is a two player variant. After the deal, each player receives eight cards. The trump is placed the same way as in two-player normal tute.

Like in normal tute after each play, the winning player after placing in the baza the two cards, will take from the deck a card and the loser the next one. The worth of cards is the same. The players can't chant tute and the rest of canticles can be made any moment of the hand (except when only two cards left in the deck). If the player has a seven of the trump suit, and the card is bigger, this card can be exchanged with the seven. The player that earn 100+ wins the game. Players can chant capote when the same player gets the last eight tricks of the hand, when a player chants capote the points earned by both doesn't count and the rest of the game depends on the player to get the 8 tricks if the player doesn't reach the 8 tricks the opponent wins the game.

== Draged tute ==
The draged tute is a three player variant, each one receives 13 cards. The last card, after the deal is done is turned face up, as in normal tute, turning in to the trump suit. The Game rules of Normal Tute stand, including the canticles.

After the final counting, the player that won more points earns 100 chips from each opponent. If the player has 100 points or fewer; 200 chips from each opponent. During the play, the player that chants the 40, earns 40 chips. For chanting the 20, earns 20 chips.

== Tute Cabrón ==
The Tute Cabrero or Tute Cabrón is a variant for three to four players; each one receives ten cards. There is no trump until a situation of the game. The Tute Cabrebrero is very similar to the Tute in Pairs the difference between the two is that there is not a single winner in every deal, there is only one loser, this is the player with an intermediate position in the hand.

When in the same hand a Knight and a King are played the player that wins the hand can make the canticle and the trump will be established after the play and the player will get 40 points. If this situation happen again the player will chant 20. When the game finishes the winners will be the player with the biggest score and the lowest score, intermediate scores or players with the same scores will be the losers.

=== Martinez Tute Cabron ===
Martinez Tute Cabron is an improvement to the tute cabron. In this variant have been introduced some modifications coming from the bridge game and from Calahorra Tute Cabron. This variant is played in Bahrain and other Arab countries.

The Martinez Tute cabron has these particularities:

1. If one player does not do any point, he loses.
2. If one player is over 110 points, he loses.
3. At the first winning round of a player, if the winner says "I go for you" that means he plays to be high, if he gets more than 120 points he wins and the other two lose, if he loses then he loses two.
4. During all the game a player is allowed to claim any tute, always after winning the round.
5. During all the game a player is allowed to claim any tute cabron, always after winning the round. Tute cabron means that the player has the 4 Kings or the 4 Queens. He has to scream: TUTE CABRON!!!
6. The game is played in three rubbers. Each rubber is completed when one of the players gets three losses.
7. At the end of the last rubber, the third, it is necessary to determinate the winner. This process is done in this way:
  1. First we count how many rubber each player has won, win a rubber means having the fewest losses.
  2. If there is a draft, then we count the number of rubbers each player has lost, loss of a rubber means having three losses.
  3. If there is a draft, then we count the total number of losses. The player with fewest losses wins the game.
  4. If there is still a draft, then it will be necessary to check who has the longest "card".
8. The person who starts the first rubber chooses the direction to go in...
  1. The loser of each rubber gets to start the first game on the next rubber...
  2. Subsequently, the loser of each rubber chooses the direction to go in...

== Auction Tute ==
The Auctioned Tute is played by 3 players or 4 in a special variant, using 36 cards of the deck (all the kings are retired from the deck before starting). At the start of each round all cards are delivered to the three players, no trump is established at the deal time as in other kinds of tute.

=== Three Player Game ===
In each round of the game one of the players competes against the other two, beating the number of points he thinks he can win with his cards (auction). At the time the auction ends, the player chooses the trump suit and tries winning as minimum the mount he estimated. At the end of the round the points of the beating player are counted, if it reaches the estimate number or wins more point, he wins the round. If he fails, the other players win even if their score is lower. During the game the canticles are the same (not including Tute), the only difference is that only the player that beats is the only one that can do it. The beating player also can claim the ten points if he wins last cards showdown.

=== Four Player Game Variation ===
The game is very similar to three player one, but each round one of the players stands out of the game. After the deal and auction, turns into the game moderator, taking and watching the cards of the player who has won the auction, and optionally increasing the amount of the bet in ten points. The auction stands in the same way as normal auctioned tute rules. When the moderator passes, the cards are returned to the player who won the bet. If the moderator increases the beat, the cards remain in his hands, and the other player gets out the deal. The next rounds follow the same rules.

=== Auction Rules ===
- The beat starts with the player that deals.
- The beat has to be a multiple of five.
- The minimum beat is 60 points, if he wins, in the next round others have to pass that score.
- If none of the players reaches 60 points, the round doesn't start.

== Win-Loss Tute ==
=== Three player game ===
The game is played with 36 cards of Spanish deck, all the cards are deal to the three players. No trumps are established at the begin. The Rules of Normal tute stand, the main objective of the game is to win most points, or less points. The player that stands in the middle losses the round. The game continues until a player has lost six times, being the overall loser. After a player makes the first canticle, he obtains 40 points and the cards of the suit of that King and Knight turn in the trump.

=== Four to Five Player Game ===
The game is played with 40 cards of Spanish deck, all the cards are deal to players, last card dealt is the trump. Rules of normal tute stand during the play. The objective is to win less points as possible, the player with most points lose unless he has 101 or more points. If there is a tie in points and one of the tied players wins the last trick losses the round. If no one of the tied players took the last trick, the player that is sitting to the right of the one who took the last trick losses.

== Moroccan Tute ==
In Morocco, the game is known as Tuti. The vocabulary of the game is of Spanish origins (shbada for espada, cobas for copas etc..). It is played in pairs, with the same scoring system as in Spain.

In some regional variations (Fes), the last card to be dealt is not shown to the players. Depending on their cards, players can bid (70,80,90,100,110,120,130,150,170,190,210,230) or pass. The auction proceeds counterclockwise. The final bid becomes the contract and the winner announces the trump. To buy a contract above 130 requires having declarations.

== American Tute ==
The game is played by 2 players. Eight cards are dealt to each one. Rules of normal tute stand, tute canticle is not valid. The first player that earns 121 or more points wins the game.

== Puerto Rican Tute ==
The game is played by 2 or 4 players, following same rules of Spain's Tute, but you have to win a trick before you can 'acusar' (declare) the 20s or 40s, or before you can exchange your 7 trump card for any points card that is the trump at the bottom of the pile, or exchange your 2 trump card for any card 7 and lower than is the trump at the bottom of the pile. You also get a chance to exchange your 7 or 2 card before any of the players start playing, so this brief moment is usually allowed by the other players. (In honor of the Fernandez-Vargas Family from Mayaguez, PR)
