= Edward Lawrence (merchant) =

Sir Edward Lawrence
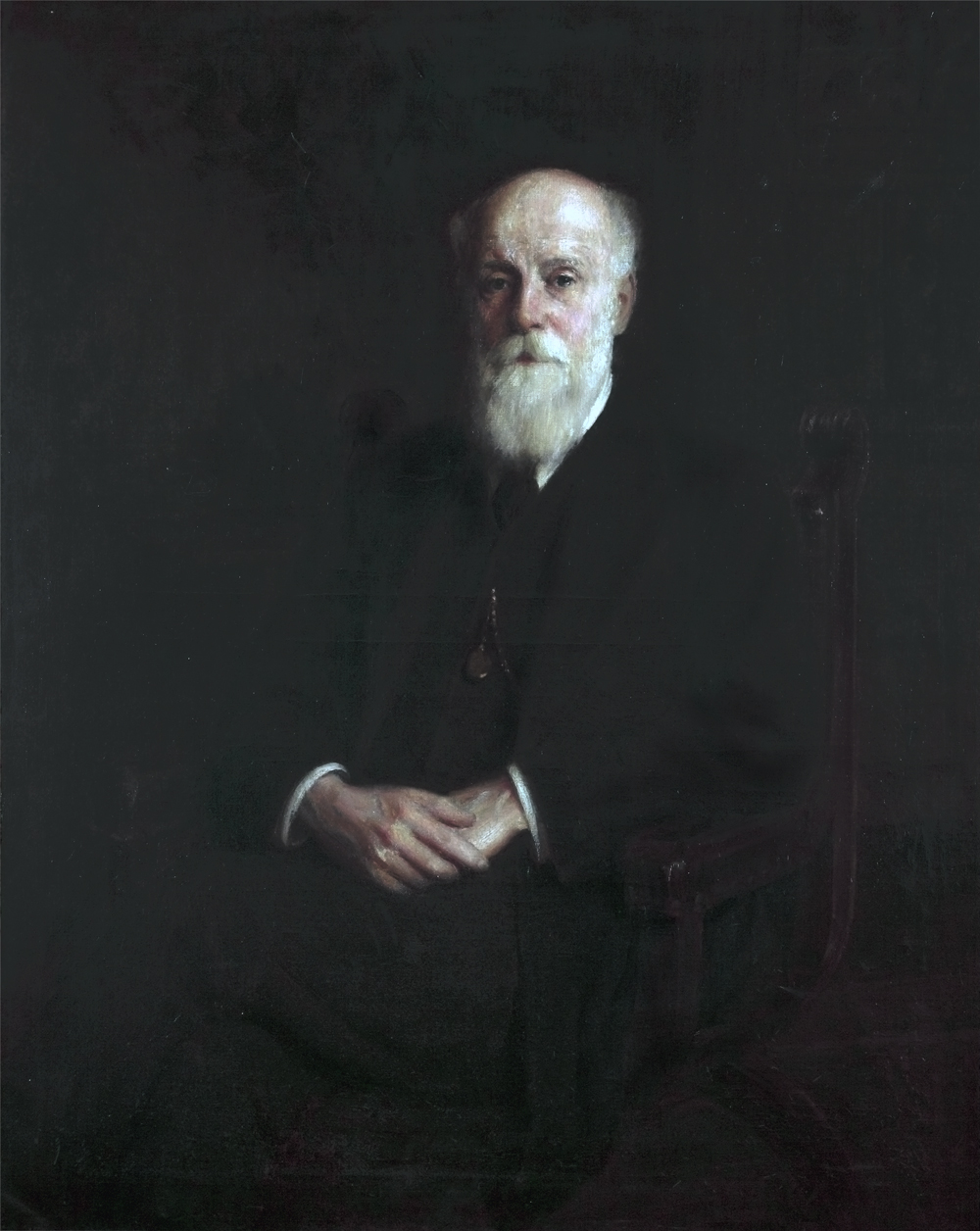
- Portrait of Edward Lawrence in the 19th century
- Born: 1825; Liverpool, United Kingdom
- Died: 1909 (aged 83–84)
- Occupation: Merchant
- Known for: British merchant attempting to circumvent the Union blockade
- Spouse: Jane Harrison Redmayne (m. 1853)
- Children: 4

Sir Edward Lawrence (1825–1909) was an English merchant in Liverpool. He dealt in cotton and was a major figure of the British merchants' effort to circumvent the Union blockade of exports from the Confederate states during the American civil war.

== Early life ==
He was a younger son of the Liverpool brewer James Lawrence (c.1799–1864), who was Mayor of Liverpool in 1844. Schooled to age 16, he was apprenticed to Jones, Mann & Foster, cotton brokers in Liverpool. He then travelled for three years, in Asia and the United States. Returning to Liverpool, he went into business on his own account, setting up Edward Lawrence & Co. and trading with Bombay.

== Edward Lawrence & Co. and the blockade of the Confederacy ==
During the American Civil War, Edward Lawrence & Co. was in partnership with the Anglo-Confederate Trading Company. It commissioned the blockade runner Wild Dayrell under Captain Thomas Cubbins, which was destroyed in 1864 by USS Sassacus off North Carolina.

Lawrence was part of the consortium which commissioned the early blockade-runner Banshee, also for the Anglo-Confederate Trading Company. It was owned by John Toulmin Lawrence, his brother and a partner in the company. The Banshee sailed between Nassau, Bahamas and Wilmington, North Carolina; in Nassau the cotton cargo was unloaded, and then loaded onto British ocean-going vessels.

Further, Lawrence was the owner of SS Night Hawk, captured by USS Niphon in 1864. He pursued a claim related to the Night Hawk with William H. Seward, through the diplomat Joseph Hume Burnley.

== In politics ==
Lawrence was on Liverpool Town Council from 1861 to 1867, and then from 1892 as an Alderman. He was Mayor of Liverpool 1864–65. In 1865 he stood as the Conservative candidate in Lancaster and was defeated. A commission on electoral corruption in the constituency reported in 1867, to which his brother John gave evidence.

== Later life ==
Lawrence was from 1863 a director of the British and Foreign Marine Insurance Company. He resided in a house on Barkhill Road, Aigburth, on which he had Alfred Waterhouse do work in 1865. An obituary stated that as well as being "chairman of the Liverpool Gas Company, and director of many leading concerns" he took "a keen interest in the Royal Albert Asylum at Lancaster, of which he was one of the founders".

In 1874 Lawrence was a member of Liverpool's Association to Promote Higher Education, and in 1878 at Liverpool Town Hall proposed the founding of a University College for the city. After it was set up, with Waterhouse as architect from 1878, he chaired from 1881 the initial Council of Governors that ran it, with Charles Beard as vice-chair. He later chaired the Council of University College, Liverpool from 1891 to 1893.

Lawrence was a director of the Liverpool Overhead Railway from 1889, and in 1894 became one of the original directors of the Bank of British West Africa. In 1899 he was knighted. In 1907 he was awarded an honorary LL.D. by the University of Liverpool.

At the time of his death on 31 May 1909, Lawrence's address was St Michael's Hamlet, Liverpool.

== Family ==
In 1853 Lawrence married Jane Harrison Redmayne, daughter of Giles Redmayne of Brathay Hall, and sister of George Tunstal Redmayne. They had three sons, and one daughter who survived to adulthood. Their eldest son Edward born c.1855 joined the Indian Civil Service.

Another son, Hubert, born c.1859, went to Rugby School. Edward Lawrence & Co. had an interest in an estate near Jugra, Malaya, floated as a limited company in 1900, producing coffee, coconuts and rubber when ramie proved not to have commercial value. After his father's death Hubert was involved in its management.

Their daughter Amy married in 1877 the Rev. Charles Girdlestone Hopkinson (died 1928).
