= Ralph Abercromby Campbell =

Former Chief Justice of the Bahamas

Sir Ralph Abercromby Campbell (16 March 1906 – 10 October 1989) was a British colonial judge who was Chief Justice of the Bahamas from 10 August 1960 to 31 May 1970.

Campbell was born in 1906 in London, the son of Scottish parents: Maj. William Orr Campbell MC, a stockbroker; and his wife, Elsie Douglas Abercromby. His great-grandfather was Sir Robert Abercromby, 5th Baronet.
