= Martin Wiener =

American academic and author (born 1941)

Martin Joel Wiener (born 1941) is an American academic and author. He is currently a research professor at Rice University.

Keith Joseph gave a copy of Wiener's book English Culture and the Decline of the Industrial Spirit: 1850–1980 to every cabinet minister.

== Selected bibliography ==
- Between Two Worlds: The Political Thought of Graham Wallas, Oxford: Clarendon Press, 1971.
- English Culture and the Decline of the Industrial Spirit: 1850–1980. Cambridge: Cambridge U.P., 1981; paperback edition. Harmondsworth: Penguin Books, 1985; new edition. Cambridge: Cambridge U.P., 2004.
- Review article "Treating 'Historical' Sources as Literary Texts: Literary Historicism and Modern British History," The Journal of Modern History Vol. 70, No. 3, September 1998
- Reconstructing the Criminal: Culture, Law and Policy in England, 1830–1914. Cambridge: Cambridge University Press, 1990.
- Men of Blood: Violence, Manliness and Criminal Justice in Victorian England, New York: Cambridge University Press, 2004.
- An Empire on Trial: Race, Murder and Justice under British Rule 1870–1835, New York: Cambridge University Press, 2008.
- Edgerton, D. (2006) Warfare State: Britain, 1920 – 1970. Cambridge: Cambridge University Press.
- Edgerton, D. (1991) England and the Aeroplane – An Essay on a Militant and Technological Nation.
