= Chief Justice of the Bahamas =

The chief justice of the Bahamas heads the Supreme Court of the Bahamas.

== Legal basis ==
The position of chief justice is authorised by Article 93(2) of the Constitution of the Bahamas. Under Article 94(1), the governor-general appoints the chief justice on the recommendation of the prime minister after consultation with the leader of the opposition. Removal of the chief justice is governed by Article 96(6); the prime minister recommends removal to the governor-general, who then forms a tribunal of at least three members selected by the governor-general in accordance with the advice of the prime minister. Under Article 98(2), the chief justice may be invited to sit on the Court of Appeal by the president of that court.

== List of chief justices ==
British Crown Colony of the Bahamas, 1718-1973

- Thomas Walker, 1718– (died 1723)
- Sir William Morison, c.1770
- Thomas Atwood, 1773-1785
- John Matson, 1785-1789 (afterwards Chief Justice of Dominica, 1789)
- Stephen de Lancey c.1790–1797
- Moses Franks 1799–1805 (died 1810) United States Gazette, March 6, 1805. Phila., PA
- William Vesey Munnings 1811–1836
- Sir John Campbell Lees 1836–1865
- Sir William Henry Doyle 1865–
- Sir George Campbell Anderson 1875–
- Henry William Austin, 1880–1890
- Roger Yelverton (1890–1893)
- (Sir) Charles George Walpole, 1893–1897
- Sir Ormond Drimmie Malcolm 1897–1910
- Sir John Bromhead Matthews 1910–1911
- Daniel Thomas Tudor 1911–1922
- Sir Sidney Charles Nettleton 1922–1924 (afterwards Chief Justice of Cyprus, 1924)
- Sir Ewen Reginald Logan 1925–1927
- Sir Kenneth James Beatty 1927–1931 (afterwards Chief Justice of Gibraltar, 1931)
- Sir Richard Clifford Tute, K.C.M.G, 1932-1939
- Sir Oscar Bedford Daly, 1939–unk
- Sir Oswald Lawrence Bancroft, unk–1951
- Alfred Francis Adderley, 1951
- Sir Guy Wilmot McLintock Henderson 1951–1960
- Sir Ralph Abercrombie Campbell, 11 August 1960 to 31 May 1970
- William Gordon Bryce, C.B.E., Q.C., 1 June 1970 to 30 June 1973

Bahamas after independence in 1973

- Sir Leonard J. Knowles, 4 July 1973 to 6 August 1978
- James Alfred Smith, 7 July 1978 to 11 May 1980
- Harvey Lloyd da Costa, 18 November 1980 to 31 December 1981
- Vivian O. Blake, 1 January 1982 to 9 September 1983
- Sir Denis Eustace Gilbert Malone (acting), 10 September to 31 December 1983
- Rt. Hon. Mr. Philip Telford Georges, 1 January 1984 to 30 September 1989
- Sir Joaquim Gonsalves Sabola, 1 October 1989 to 31 December 1995
- Sir Cyril S. S. Fountain, 1 January 1995 to 30 October 1996
- Dame Joan A. Sawyer, DBE, 1 November 1996 to 26 November 2001
- Sir Burton P. C. Hall, KSS, KHS, 2001 to 2009
- Hon. Sir Michael L. Barnett, 24 August 2009 to 31 January 2015
- Hon. Sir Hartman Longley, 2 February 2015 to 22 December 2017
- Hon. Stephen Isaacs, 10 August 2018 to 24 August 2018
- Hon. Sir Brian Moree, KC, 12 June 2019 to 3 August 2022
- Hon. Sir Ian Winder, 3 August 2022 to Present
