= Law of the Bahamas =

The basis of the Bahamian Law and legal system lies within the English Common Law tradition. Justices of the Supreme Court, Registrars and Magistrates are all appointed by The Governor-General acting on the advice of the Judicial and Legal Service Commission, which is composed of five individuals who are headed by the Chief Justice as their chairman. The Chief Justice and the Justices of the Court of Appeal, including the President, are appointed by the Governor-General on the recommendation of the Prime Minister after consultation with the Leader of the Opposition. Once appointed, the salaries and other terms of appointment of the Chief Justice, Justices of Appeal, and Justices of the Supreme Court cannot be altered to their disadvantage. Justices of the Supreme Court can serve until the age of 65 years and, where agreed among the judge, the Prime Minister and the Leader of the Opposition, may serve until the age of 67. Justices of Appeal can serve until the age of 68 years and, where agreed among the judge, the Prime Minister, and the Leader of the Opposition, may serve until the age of 70 years. The law of the Bahamas provides for the appointment of 12 Justices to the Bench of the Supreme Court, including the Chief Justice, and for five Justices of the Court of Appeal, including the President. The Chief Justice, as Head of the Judiciary, is an ex officio member of the Court of Appeal, but only sits at the invitation of the President.

== Legal system ==
The constitution of the Bahamas came into force on 10 July 1973. It has a parliamentary system of government as one of the provisions.

=== Criminal matters ===
Proceedings are all instituted in the name of the King in the Supreme Court and in the name of the Commissioner of Police in the Magistrate's Court. The Magistrate's Court hears summary matters or indictable matters, which may be heard summarily. Stipendiary and Circuit Magistrates have jurisdiction to impose a maximum sentence of five years. They also conduct preliminary inquiries in indictable matters to determine whether a prima facie case has been made against an accused person. If a prima facie case is made out, the accused is committed to the Supreme Court to stand trial. If the person is tried and convicted in the Magistrate's Court, an appeal lies to the Supreme Court or to the Court of Appeal, depending on the nature of the offense. An appeal may lie from the Court of Appeal to the Judicial Committee of His Majesty's Privy Council, which is the highest Court of Appeal in the Bahamas.

=== Civil matters ===
Most civil cases are heard solely by a judge. Appeals from final judgments of the Supreme Court in civil cases lie as of right to the Court of Appeal, and with the leave of the Court of Appeal and Supreme Court in some interlocutory matters or further appeals from Tribunals. Stipendiary and Circuit Magistrates can also hear and determine Civil cases if the amount claimed does not exceed BS$5,000.00...

== Court of Appeal ==
The Court of Appeal is made up of a President, the Chief Justice, who, as head of the judiciary, is an ex officio member of the court and sits at the invitation of the President, and not less than two and not more than four Justices of Appeal. The court has jurisdiction to hear and determine appeals from judgments, orders, and sentences made by the Supreme Court. The Court of Appeal also has the jurisdiction to hear and determine appeals from matters in a magisterial court in respect of indictable offenses triable summarily if - (i) the court had no jurisdiction or exceeded its jurisdiction in the matter; (ii) the decision was unreasonable, could not be supported by the evidence, or was erroneous in point of law; (iii) the decision of the magistrate or the sentence passed was based on a wrong principle; (iv) some material illegality occurred affecting the merits of the case; or (v) the sentence was too severe or lenient.

== Supreme Court ==
The Supreme Court is the third-highest in the Bahamas' adjudicative hierarchy. The Supreme Court is made up of a Chief Justice and not more than eleven and not less than two Justices of the Court. The Governor-General appoints the Chief Justice on the recommendation of the Prime Minister after consultation with the Leader of the Opposition. The Governor-General appoints justices of the Supreme Court on the advice of the Judicial and Legal Service Commission.

The Supreme Court has unlimited original jurisdiction in civil and criminal causes and matters, and appellate jurisdiction conferred on it by the Supreme Court Act, 1996, or any other law, including appeals from the Magistrates' Court. Appeals from the Supreme Court can be heard by the Court of Appeal, the highest domestic court in the Bahamas; appeals can also be made from either court to the Judicial Committee of the Privy Council, the country's highest court.

== Magistrates' Court ==
The Magistrate's Court is the lowest in the Bahamas. This court is the primary court for many civil and criminal cases. Magistrates are appointed by the Governor-General acting in accordance with the advice of the Judicial and Legal Service Commission. This court is presided over by Stipendiary and Circuit Magistrates, including the Chief Magistrate and two Deputy Chief Magistrates. At times, the Magistrates from New Providence also go on circuit to the other Islands where there is no resident Magistrate or in cases where the resident magistrate is unable, for whatever reason, to hear a case.

A Magistrate has jurisdiction to try all summary offenses, investigate all charges of indictable offenses, and to hear and determine any civil cause where the amount to be recovered or the value of the property in dispute does not exceed $5,000.00, unless a statute provides jurisdiction in relation to a higher amount. There are also dedicated Magistrate's Courts for juvenile cases, family/domestic matters, drug offenses, and gun offenses.

== Industrial Tribunals ==
The Industrial Tribunal is made up of three members who have been appointed by the Governor-General acting on the advice of the Judicial and Legal Service Commission. The Tribunal has the power to hear and determine trade disputes; register industrial agreements; hear and determine cases relating to the registration of such agreements; make orders or awards; and award compensation on complaints brought and proved before the Tribunal.
