= Charles Wilton Wood Greenidge =

West Indies judge

Charles Wilton Wood Greenidge was the vice president of the Anti-Slavery Society in 1968. He was secretary of the society from 1941 to 1956 and director from 1957 to 1958.

== Early life ==
Greenidge was born on 10 January 1889 in the parish of St James Barbados. He was the youngest son of Charles Joseph Greenidge, a member of the Colonial Parliament of Barbados the West Indies by his second wife, Edith Marion Wood. He was a distant cousin of Abel Hendy Jones Greenidge. He was educated at Harrison College, Barbados, and then Downing College, Cambridge, where he read law.

== Career ==
He was appointed a Magistrate in St Kitts, Leeward Islands, in 1919 and Magistrate in Barbados in 1923. He rose to the office of Court of Appeal Judge in 1925. He then transferred to Port of Spain, Trinidad as a Magistrate in 1927. Later, he acted as Solicitor General and then-Attorney General as well as being a member of the Legislative Council. A further posting as Chief Justice of British Honduras followed in 1932–36. In 1936, he took up the post of Solicitor General of Nigeria where he remained for five years. He was a member of the Logang on Development of British Guyana and British Honduras in 1947 and appointed to the United Nations' Ad Hoc Committee of Experts on Slavery 1950–51. In 1956, he estimated there were 500,000 slaves in the Arabian peninsula, with King Saud a major patron. Between 1958 and 1962, he was a member of the Legislative Council of Barbados.

== Personal life ==
When he was not posted overseas, he lived most of his life in Barbados, with a second home in Malta. He was unmarried and died 28 April 1972 in Nice, France.

The Greenidge family traced their ancestry in Barbados to John of Greenwich who left London on 2 May 1635 on Alexander. Within one generation the etymon, meaning Green Port or Trading Place (cf Norwich, Harwich, Ipswich and Sandwich in England), he had assumed distinctly the West Indian orthographic format of Greenidge of which he maintained a very similar phenomic identity.

== Papers and publications ==
- 1943: Forced Labour
- 1945: Land Hunger in the Colonies
- 1947: Impressions of Four West Indian Islands Visited in 1946
- 1948: Forced Labour updated
- 1949: The Present Outlook in the British West Indies
- 1950: The British Caribbean Federation
- 1952: Slavery in the Twentieth Century
- 1953: Memorandum on Slavery
- 1954: Slavery at the United Nations
- 1955: Slavery and the United Nations
- 1956: Memorandum on Forced Labour in Portuguese West Africa
- 1958: Slavery (Published George Allen and Unwin)
