= Supreme Court of the Bahamas =

Third highest court in the adjudicative hierarchy of the Commonwealth of the Bahamas

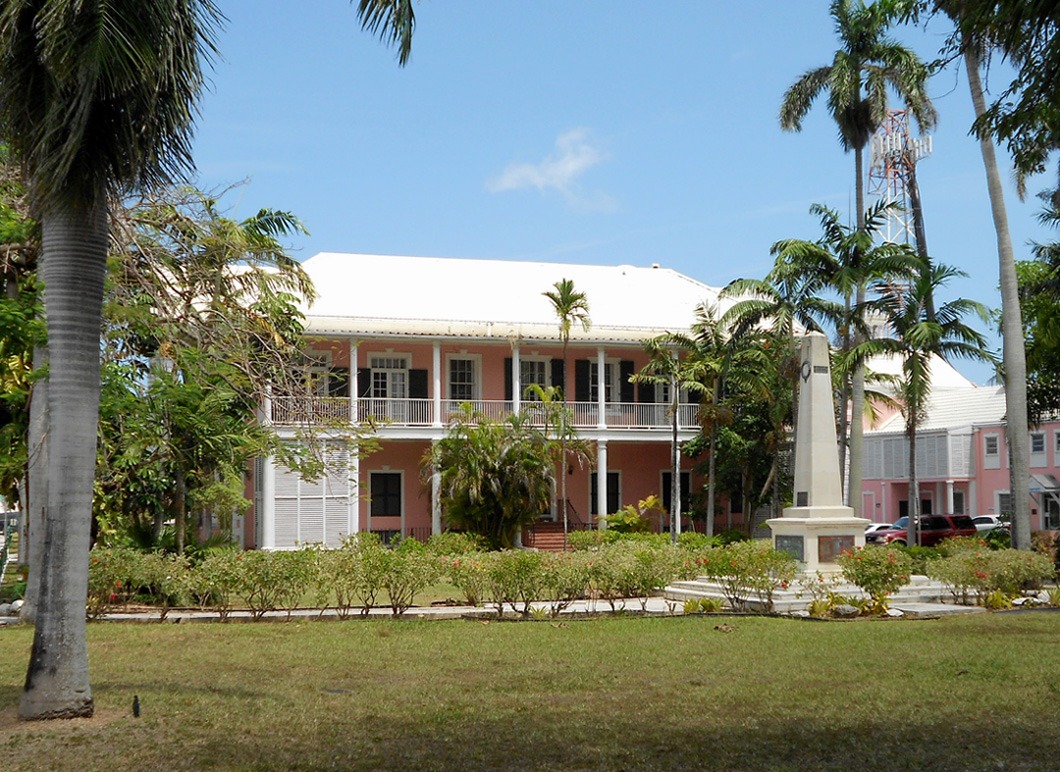
- Supreme Court Building in Nassau
- Established: 1896
- Jurisdiction: The Bahamas
- Location: Nassau; Freeport; Eight Mile Rock
- Authorised by: Article 93, Section 1 of the Constitution of the Bahamas
- Judge term length: Until the age of 65 (or 67)
- Number of positions: 11
- Website: Official website

Chief Justice
- Currently: The Hon. Sir Ian Winder
- Since: 3 August 2022

The Supreme Court of the Bahamas is the third highest court in the adjudicative hierarchy of the Commonwealth of the Bahamas. The court was created by Article 93(1) of the Constitution. Before that, the Supreme Court was governed by the Supreme Court Act of 1896.

The Neo-Georgian style building which is home to the Supreme Court in New Providence is located on Bank Lane. Ground was broken for the building in 1921 by then Governor of the Colony of the Bahamas, Sir Harry Cordeaux. The courthouse is similar in design to the Central Public Building which is north of the building. On April 18, 1994, the first sitting of the Supreme Court in Grand Bahama was held at the Grant Levarity Justice Center in Freeport.

== Jurisdiction ==
The Supreme Court of the Bahamas has unlimited jurisdiction in general, civil and criminal matters.

== Justices ==
On the advice of the Prime Minister, and after consultation with the Leader of the Opposition, the Governor General of the Bahamas appoints the Chief Justice. The Chief Justice is the head of the Judicature in the Bahamas and sits in the Supreme Court. He can also sit in the Court of Appeal, at the invitation of the President of the Court of Appeal. The current Chief Justice of The Bahamas is The Hon. Brian Moree.

Other justices of the Supreme Court are appointed by the Governor General on the advice of the Judicial and Legal Services Commission. Article 93(2) of the Constitution states that the Justices of the Supreme Court shall be the Chief Justice and such number of other Justices as may be prescribed by Parliament. The Supreme Court Act of The Bahamas, section 3 states that there are to be, in addition to the Chief Justice, no more than twenty and no less than six Justices in the Supreme Court. The Act also states that only two justices may bear the title "Senior Justice". To qualify to become a justice of the Supreme Court, a person must have been a member of the Bahamas Bar or the Bar of a Commonwealth country qualifying them to practise as an attorney in the Bahamas. At least ten years' experience as a counsel or attorney is also required. The salary and other terms of office cannot be lowered during a justice's term of office. A Supreme Court justice may serve up until the age of 65, or 67 if agreed upon.

== Courts ==
The Supreme Court is third in the adjudicative hierarchy of the Bahamas. Appeals made by the Supreme Court can be struck down by the Court of Appeal, which is the highest domestic court in the Bahamas; appeals can be made from either court to the Judicial Committee of the Privy Council, which is the highest court for the country.

== Security of the Courts ==
Discussions over the security of the Supreme Court building in Nassau came after thieves broke into it and stole over 200 case files. The thieves gained access to the building through the chambers of Justice Jon Isaacs, and exited the building with several personal items on hand. They also wrote "The PLP must win the next election. All FNM must die" on the entry door to Justice Isaacs' chambers, together with a drawing of a gun. After these break-ins, it was announced that there would be new security upgrades to the building.
