= September =

Ninth month in the Gregorian and Julian calendars

<<	September					>>
Su	Mo	Tu	We	Th	Fr	Sa
		1	2	3	4	5
6	7	8	9	10	11	12
13	14	15	16	17	18	19
20	21	22	23	24	25	26
27	28	29	30
2026

September is the ninth month of the year in the Julian and Gregorian calendars. Its length is 30 days.

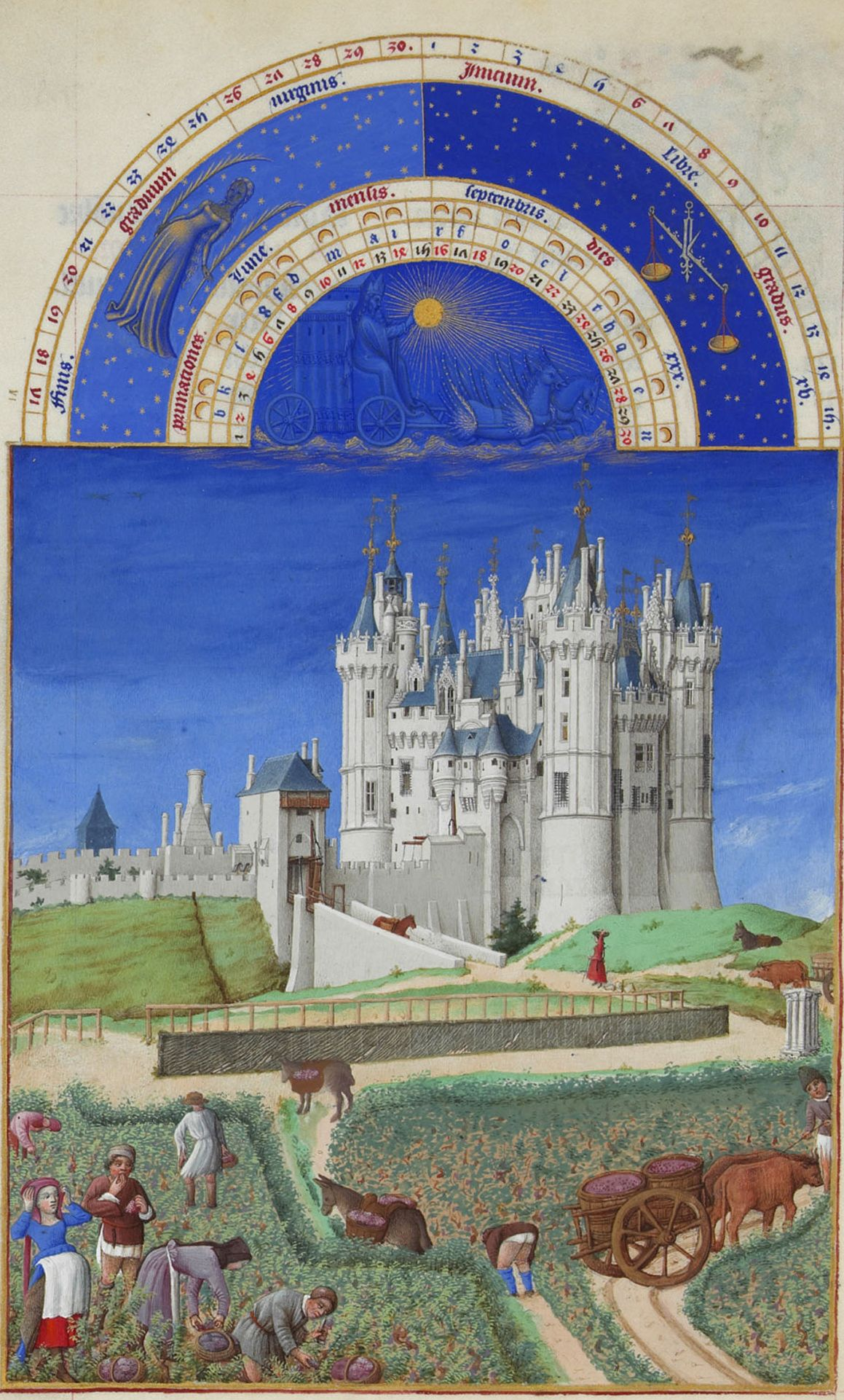
September, from the Très Riches Heures du Duc de Berry

In recent decades, the number of warm temperature records in September has outpaced cold temperature records over a growing portion of Earth's surface.

Chart shows changes in global average temperature annually in September of each year

September in the Northern Hemisphere and March in the Southern Hemisphere are seasonally equivalent. In the Northern Hemisphere, the beginning of the meteorological autumn is on 1 September. In the Southern Hemisphere, the beginning of the meteorological spring is on 1 September.

September marks the beginning of the ecclesiastical year in the Eastern Orthodox Church. It is the start of the academic year in many countries of the northern hemisphere, in which children go back to school after the summer break, sometimes on the first day of the month. Some Libras and Virgos are born in September, with Virgos being born on September 1st through September 22nd and Libras September 23rd through September 30.

September (from Latin septem, "seven") was originally the seventh month in the oldest known Roman calendar, the calendar of Romulus c. 750 BC, with March (Latin Martius) being the first month of the year until perhaps as late as 451 BC. After the calendar reform that added January and February to the beginning of the year, September became the ninth month but retained its name. It had 29 days until the Julian reform, which added a day.

== Events ==
Ancient Roman observances for September include Ludi Romani, originally celebrated from September 12 to September 14, later extended to September 5 to September 19. In the 1st century BC, an extra day was added in honor of the deified Julius Caesar on 4 September. Epulum Jovis was held on September 13. Ludi Triumphales was held from September 18–22. The Septimontium was celebrated in September, and on December 11 on later calendars. These dates do not correspond to the modern Gregorian calendar.

September was called the "harvest month" in Charlemagne's calendar. September corresponds partly to the Fructidor and partly to the Vendémiaire of the first French republic. September is called Herbstmonat, harvest month, in Switzerland. The Anglo-Saxons called the month Gerstmonath, barley month, that crop being then usually harvested.

In 1752, the British Empire adopted the Gregorian calendar. In the British Empire that year, September 2 was immediately followed by September 14.

On Usenet, it is said that September 1993 (Eternal September) never ended.

In the United States, September is the third most common birth month, after August and July, which both have 31 days. Nine of the top 10 most common birthdays fall in September, with September 9 being the most common (and December 25 being the least common across the year), according to birth data collected by the National Center for Health Statistics between 1994 and 2014.

== Astronomy and astrology ==
The September equinox takes place in this month, and certain observances are organized around it. It is the Autumn equinox in the Northern Hemisphere, and the Vernal equinox in the Southern Hemisphere. The dates can vary from 21 September to 24 September (in UTC).

September is mostly in the sixth month of the astrological calendar (and the first part of the seventh), which begins at the end of March/Mars/Aries.

== Symbols ==
September's birthstone is the sapphire. The birth flowers are the forget-me-not, morning glory and aster. The zodiac signs are Virgo (until September 22) and Libra (September 23 onward).

== Observances ==
This list does not necessarily imply either official status or general observance.

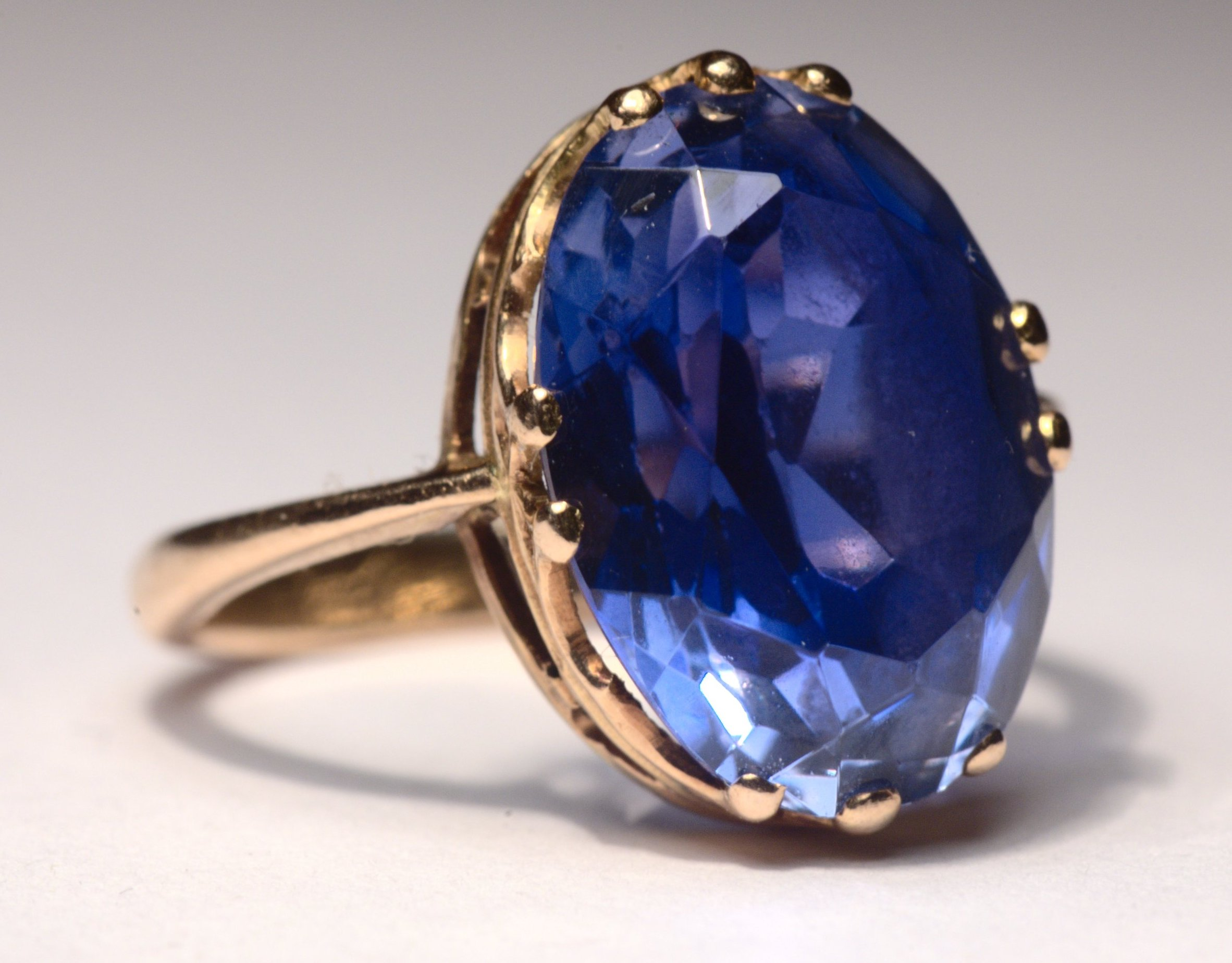
Sapphire, a birthstone of September

=== Non-Gregorian ===
- List of observances set by the Bahá'í calendar
- List of observances set by the Chinese calendar
- List of observances set by the Hebrew calendar
- List of observances set by the Islamic calendar
- List of observances set by the Solar Hijri calendar

=== Month-long ===
- Amerindian Heritage Month (Guyana)
- Childhood Cancer Awareness Month (United Kingdom)
- Gynecologic Cancer Awareness Month
- Leukemia and Lymphoma Awareness Month
- Ovarian Cancer Awareness Month
- Thyroid Cancer Awareness Month
- National Suicide Prevention Month
- National Fruits & Veggies Month

==== United States ====
- Better Breakfast Month
- Food Safety Education Month
- National Childhood Obesity Awareness Month
- Hydrocephalus Awareness Month
- Pain Awareness Month
- National Preparedness Month
- National Prostate Health Month
- National Sickle Cell Awareness Month
- National Yoga Month

===== Food months =====
- National Bourbon Heritage Month
- California Wine Month
- National Chicken Month
- National Honey Month
- National Mushroom Month
- National Italian Cheese Month
- National Papaya Month
- National Potato Month
- National Rice Month
- National Whole Grains Month
- National Wild Rice Month

=== Movable Gregorian ===
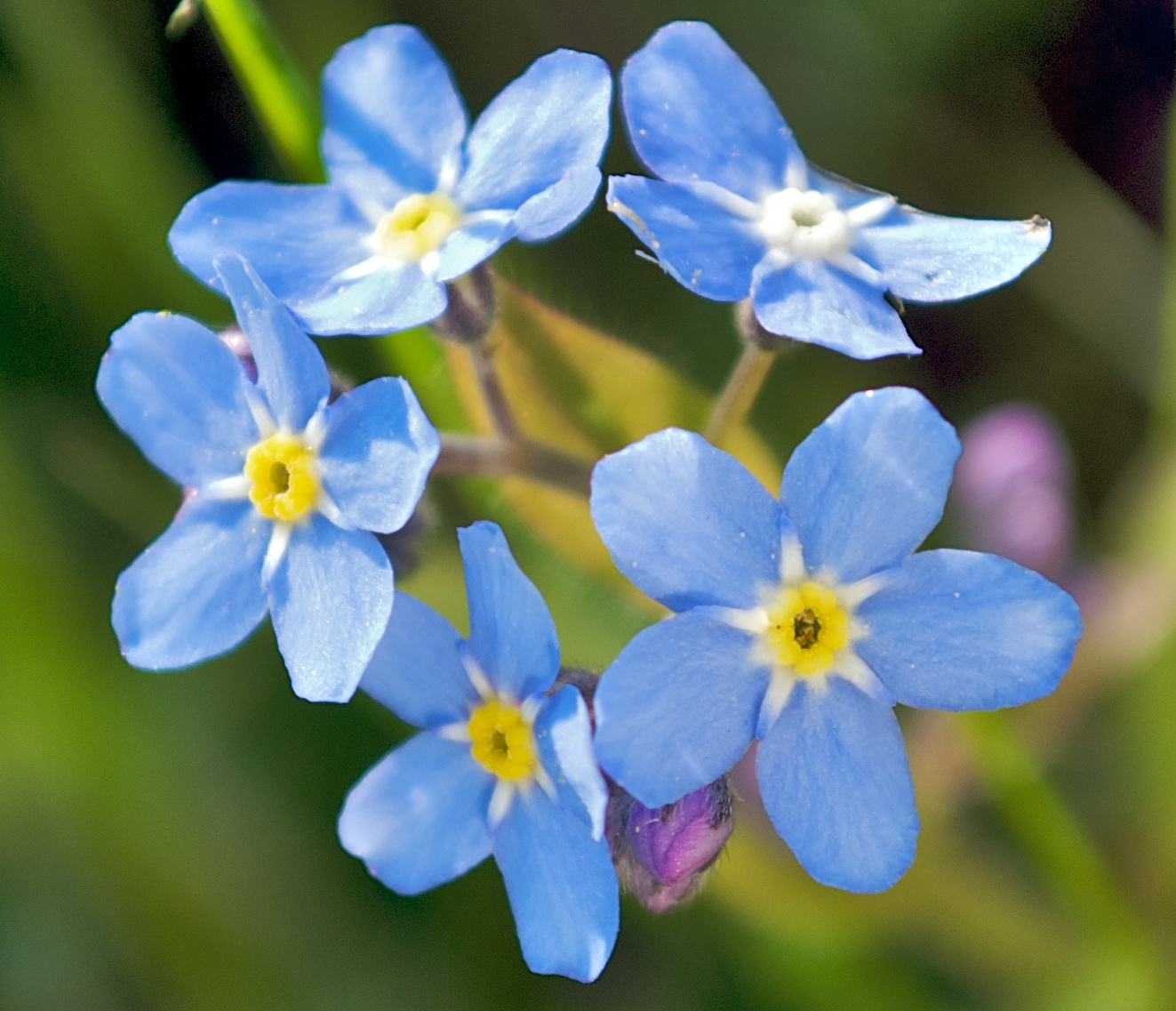
Forget-me-not, the birth flower of September

- Engineering Day (Egypt)
- White Balloon Day
- Day of the Programmer
- Te Wiki o te Reo Māori (Māori Language Week) (New Zealand)
- See also Movable Western Christian observances
- See also Movable Eastern Christian observances

==== First Wednesday ====
- Administrative Professionals' Day (South Africa)

==== First Thursday ====
- Engineer's Days (Tanzania)

==== First Friday ====
- Engineer's Days (Tanzania)
- Labor Day (Marshall Islands)
- Teachers' Day (Singapore)

==== First Sunday ====
- Brazilian Day (International observance)
- Father's Day (Australia, Fiji, New Zealand, Papua New Guinea)
- Memorial of the Holy Guardian Angels (Roman Catholic Church, October 2 in most locations, first Sunday in September by special dispensation)

==== First Sunday after September 4 ====
- Wakes Week (Parts of England and Scotland)
  - Abbots Bromley Horn Dance (Abbots Bromley, Staffordshire, England)

==== Week of the first Monday ====
- National Payroll Week (United States, Canada, United Kingdom)

==== Week of September 10 ====
- National Suicide Prevention Week (United States)

==== First Monday ====
- Labour Day (Canada, Palau, United States)

==== Nearest weekday to September 12 ====
- Saragarhi Day (Sikhism)

==== Second Saturday ====
- Day of the Workers in the Oil, Gas, Power, and Geological Industry (Turkmenistan)

==== Saturday after first Monday ====
- Carl Garner Federal Lands Cleanup Day (United States)

==== Second Sunday ====
- Auditor's Day (Church of Scientology)
- Father's Day (Latvia)
- National Grandparents' Day (Canada, Estonia, Philippines)
- Tanker's Day (Russia)
- Turkmen Bakhshi Day (Turkmenistan)
- International Crane Day

==== First Sunday after first Monday ====
- National Grandparents' Day (United States)

==== Week of September 17 ====
- Celebrate Freedom Week (Kansas and Texas, United States)

==== Third Tuesday ====
- Prinsjesdag (Netherlands)

==== September 17 but observed on previous Friday if it falls on a Saturday or following Monday if on a Sunday ====
- Constitution Day and Citizenship Day (United States)

==== Third Friday ====
- National POW/MIA Recognition Day (United States)

POW☆MIA Flag.

==== Third Saturday ====
- National Cleanup Day (United States)
- Oktoberfest celebrations begin (German diaspora, local dates may vary)
- Software Freedom Day (International observance)

==== Weekend of the week of September 17 ====
- Von Steuben Day (United States)

==== Third Sunday ====
- Day of the Walloon Region (Wallonia, Belgium)
- Father's Day (Ukraine)
- Federal Day of Thanksgiving, Repentance and Prayer (Switzerland)
- Warachikuy (Cusco, Peru)

==== Week of Sunday before September 23 ====
- Bisexual Awareness Week

==== Week of September 22 ====
- Tolkien Week

==== Last week ====
- Banned Books Week (International observance):

==== Last full week ====
- National Forest Week (Canada)
  - National Tree Day (Wednesday of last full week):
- Celebrate Freedom Week (Arkansas and Florida, United States)
- International Week of the Deaf (International observance)

==== Third Monday ====
- Respect for the Aged Day (Japan)

==== Pertaining to the September Equinox ====
- Autumnal Equinox Day (Japan)
  - French Republican New Year. (defunct)
- Guldize (Cornish people)
- Higan (Japan)
- Mabon (Neopaganism, Northern Hemisphere)
- Miķeļi (Latvia)
- Ostara (Neopaganism, Southern Hemisphere)

==== Fourth Friday ====
- Native American Day (California, United States)

==== Last Friday ====
- Manit Day (Marshall Islands)

==== Last Saturday ====
- Girls in Aviation Day (International observance)
- National Public Lands Day (United States)

==== Last Sunday ====
- Daylight saving time begins (New Zealand)
- Gold Star Mother's Day (United States)

==== Fourth Monday ====
- American Indian Day (Tennessee, United States)
- September Declaration (Flanders, Belgium)

==== Last Wednesday ====
- Maple Leaf Day (Canada)

==== Last weekday ====
- Ask a Stupid Question Day (India, United Kingdom, United States)

=== Fixed Gregorian ===
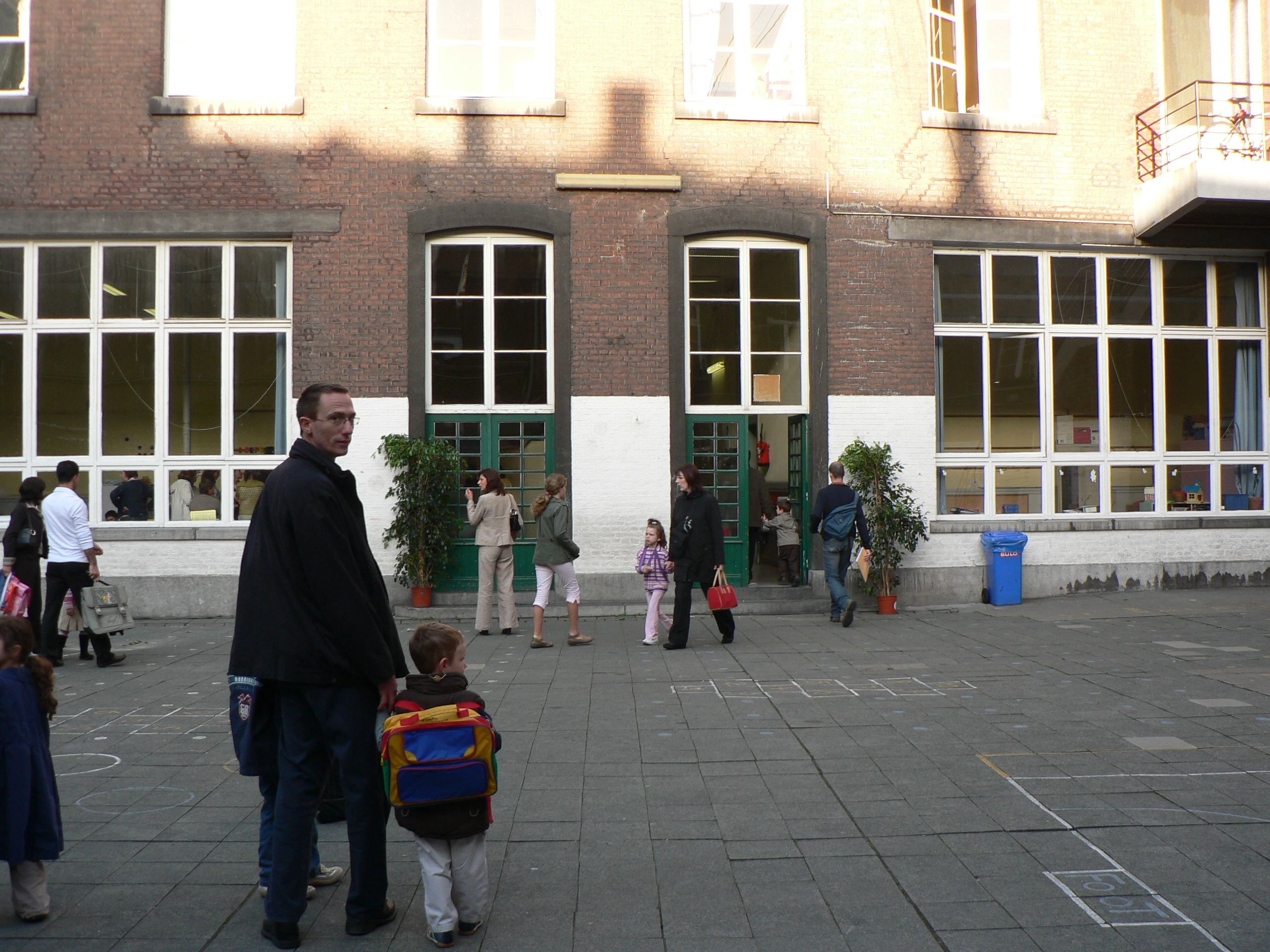
School starts in September in many countries, such as Belgium

- September 1
  - Anniversary of the Start of the Armed Struggle (Eritrea)
  - Constitution Day (Slovakia)
  - Disaster Prevention Day (Japan)
  - Emma Nutt Day (International observance)
  - First day of school in many countries in Asia, Europe and the Americas.
  - Flag Day (Honduras)
  - Independence Day (Uzbekistan)
  - Journalist Day (Taiwan)
  - Knowledge Day (Russia, Ukraine and Armenia)
  - National Cherry Popover Day (United States)
  - Random Acts of Kindness Day (New Zealand)
  - Start of National Arbor Week (South Africa), September 1–7
  - Veteran's Day (Poland)
  - Teachers' Day (Singapore)
  - Wattle Day (Australia)
- September 2
  - Democracy Day (Tibet)
  - Independence Day (Transnistria, unrecognized)
  - Independence Day (Nagorno-Karabakh Republic, unrecognized)
  - National Blueberry Popsicle Day (United States)
  - National Day (Vietnam)
  - Sedantag (German Empire, defunct)
  - Victory over Japan Day (United States)
- September 3
  - China's victory over Japan commemoration related observances:
    - Armed Forces Day (Republic of China)
    - V-J Day (People's Republic of China)
  - Feast of San Marino and the Republic (Republic of San Marino)
  - Flag Day (Australia)
  - Independence Day (Qatar)
  - Levy Mwanawasa Day (Zambia)
  - Memorial Day (Tunisia)
  - Merchant Navy Remembrance Day (Canada)
  - Merchant Navy Day (United Kingdom)
  - National Welsh Rarebit Day (United States)
  - Tokehega Day (Tokelau, New Zealand)
- September 4
  - Immigrant's Day (Argentina)
  - National Macadamia Nut Day (United States)
  - Newspaper Carrier Day (United States)
- September 5
  - International Day of Charity
  - National Cheese Pizza Day (United States)
  - Teachers' Day (India)
- September 6
  - Armed Forces Day (São Tomé and Príncipe)
  - Defence Day or Army Day (Pakistan)
  - Flag Day (Bonaire)
  - Independence Day (Eswatini)
  - National Coffee Ice Cream Day (United States)
  - Unification Day (Bulgaria)
- September 7
  - Air Force Day (Pakistan)
  - Independence Day (Brazil)
  - Military Intelligence Day (Ukraine)
  - National Acorn Squash Day (United States)
  - National Beer Lover's Day (United States)
  - National Salami Day (United States)
  - National Threatened Species Day (Australia)
  - Victory Day (Mozambique)
- September 8
  - Day of the Battle of Borodino (Russia)
  - Feast Day of Our Lady of Meritxell (Andorra)
  - Independence Day (North Macedonia)
  - International Literacy Day
  - National day (Andorra)
  - Nativity of Mary (Roman Catholic Church), (Anglo-Catholicism)
    - Monti Fest (Mangalorean Catholic)
  - Victory Day (Pakistan)
  - Victory Day (Malta)
  - World Physical Therapy Day
- September 9

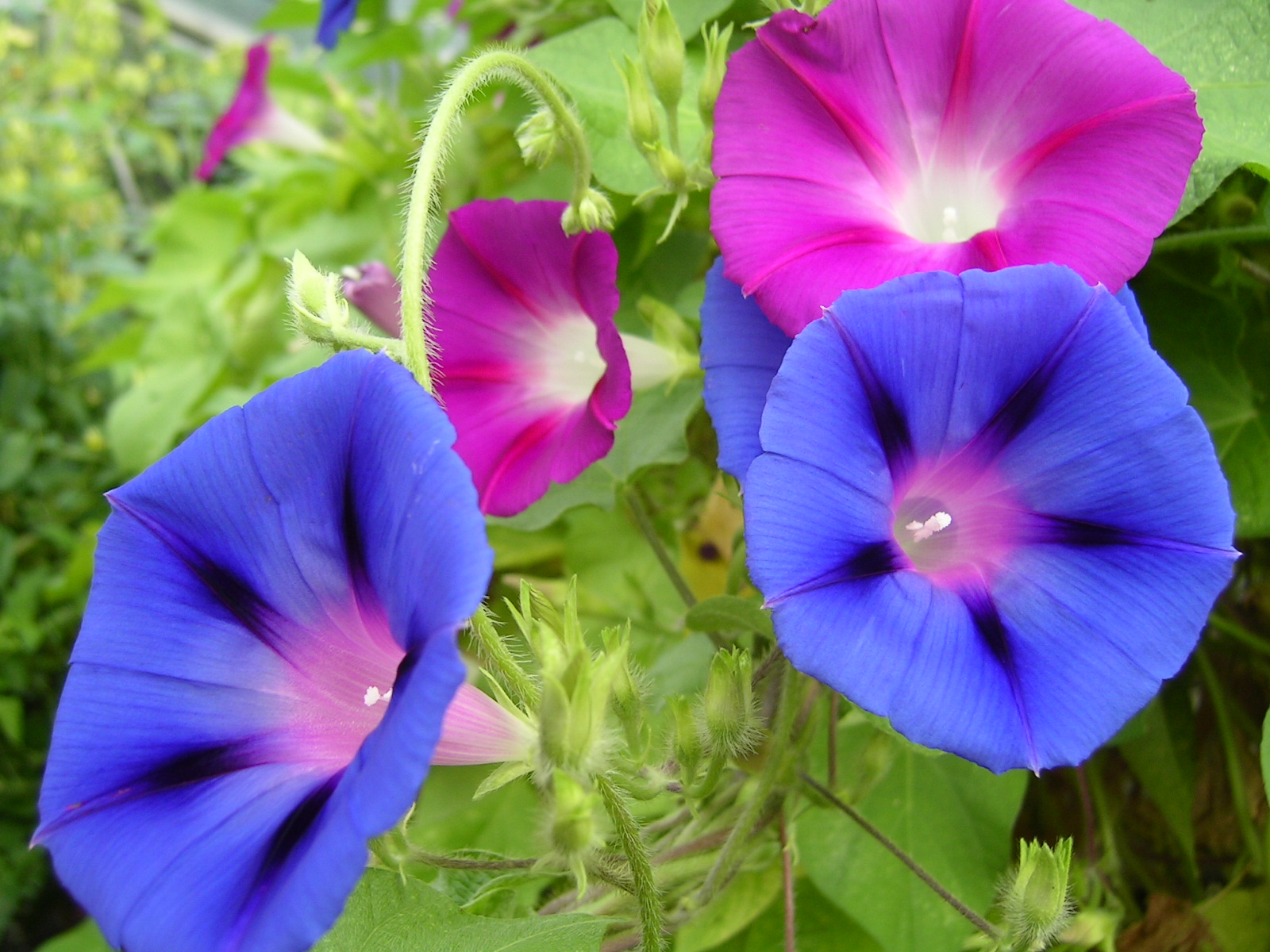
Morning glories, a birth flower of September

  - Armored Forces Day (Ukraine)
  - California Admission Day (California, United States)
  - Children's Day (Costa Rica)
  - Chrysanthemum Day (Japan)
  - Day of the Victims of Holocaust and of Racial Violence (Slovakia)
  - Emergency Services Day (United Kingdom)
  - Independence Day or Republic Day (North Korea)
  - Independence Day (Tajikistan) from USSR in 1991.
  - National Steak Au Poivre Day (United States)
  - Remembrance for Herman the Cheruscan (The Troth)
  - Wienerschnitzel Day (United States)
- September 10
  - Amerindian Heritage Day (Guyana)
  - Children's Day (Honduras)
  - National Day (Gibraltar)
  - National TV Dinner Day (United States)
  - Saint George's Caye Day (Belize)
  - Teachers' Day (China)
  - World Suicide Prevention Day
- September 11
  - Battle of Tendra Day (Russia)
  - Death Anniversary of Quaid-e-Azam Muhammad Ali Jinnah, a former holiday. (Pakistan)
  - Emergency Number Day (United States)
  - Enkutatash falls on this day if it is not a leap year.(Ethiopia, Rastafari)
  - National Day of Catalonia (Catalonia)
  - National Hot Cross Bun Day (United States)
  - Nayrouz (Coptic Orthodox Church)
  - Patriot Day (United States)
  - Teachers' Day (Argentina)
- September 12
  - Most Holy Name of the Blessed Virgin Mary
  - Day of Conception (Russia)
  - Day of the Programmer, during a leap year. (International)
  - Defenders Day (Maryland. (United States)
  - Enkutatash falls on this day if it is a leap year. (Ethiopia, Rastafari)
  - Mindfulness Day
  - National Chocolate Milkshake Day (United States)
  - National Day (Cape Verde)
  - National Day of Encouragement (United States)
- September 13
  - Day of the Programmer, during a non-leap year. (International)
  - Feast of the Cross (Assyrian Church of the East)
  - Día de los Niños Héroes (Mexico)
  - Engineer's Day (Mauritius)
  - International Chocolate Day
  - National Peanut Day (United States)
- September 14
  - Children's Day (Nepal) (celebrated on the 15th on leap years)
  - Engineer's Day (Romania)
  - Feast of the Cross (Christianity)
    - Elevation of the Holy Cross (Eastern Orthodox)
  - Hindi Diwas (Hindi-speaking regions)
  - Mobilized Servicemen Day (Ukraine)
  - National Cream Filled Donut Day (United States)
  - National Eat a Hoagie Day (United States)
  - San Jacinto Day (Nicaragua)
- September 15

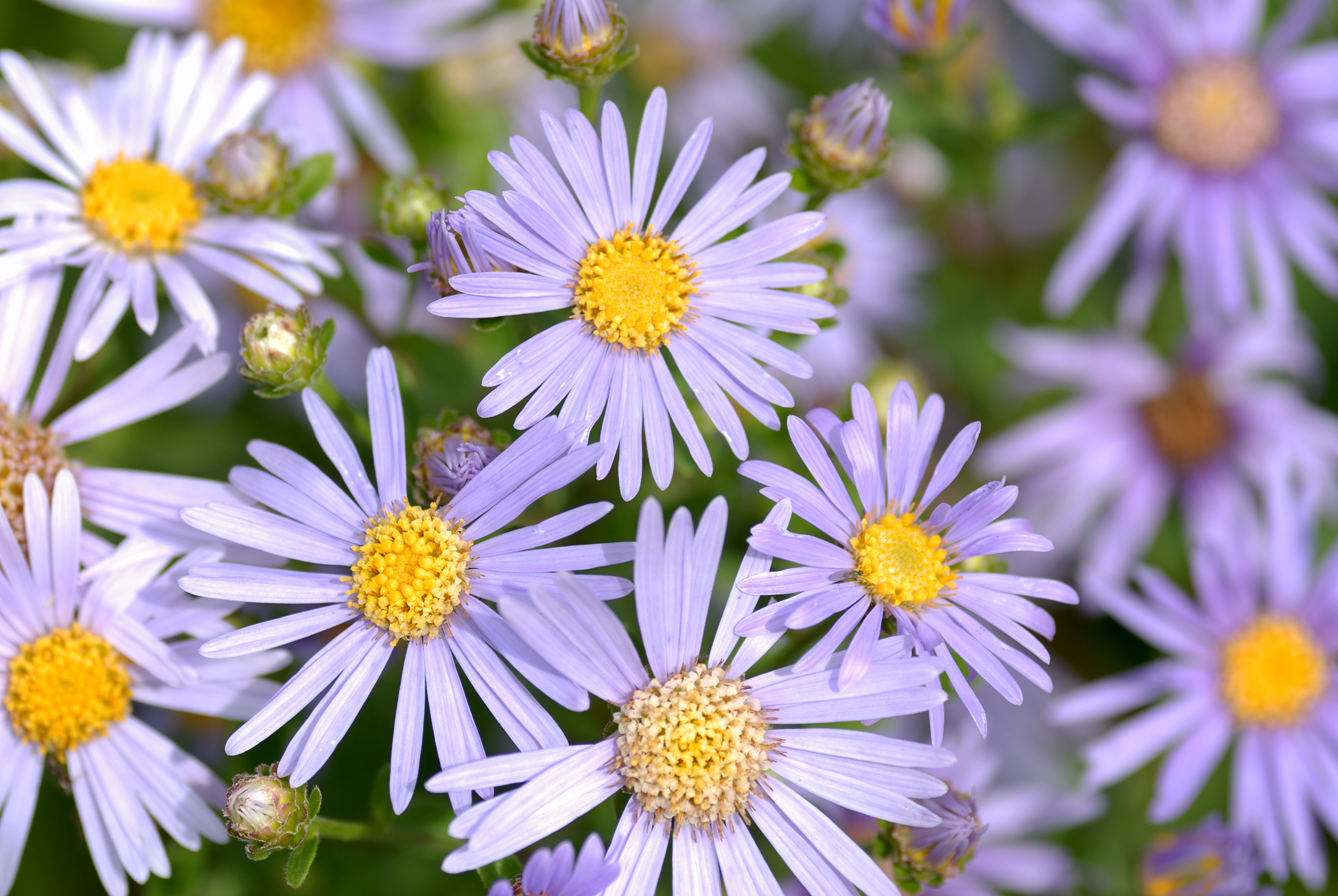
Asters, a September birth flower.

  - Battle of Britain Day (United Kingdom)
  - Children's Day (Nepal) (leap years only)
  - Engineer's Day (India)
  - Free Money Day (International)
  - Independence Day (Guatemala, El Salvador, Honduras, Nicaragua, and Costa Rica)
  - International Day of Democracy (International)
  - Knowledge Day (Azerbaijan)
  - National Crème de Menthe Day (United States)
  - National Double Cheeseburger Day (United States)
  - National Linguine Day (United States)
  - National Cheese Toast Day (United States)
  - Patriotic Day (Guatemala)
  - Restoration of Primorska to the Motherland Day (Slovenia)
  - Silpa Bhirasri Day (Thailand).
  - World Lymphoma Awareness Day
  - The beginning of National Hispanic Heritage Month, celebrated until October 15 (United States)
- September 16
  - Grito de Dolores (Mexico)
  - Independence Day (Papua New Guinea), celebrates the independence of Papua New Guinea from Australia in 1975.
  - International Day for the Preservation of the Ozone Layer
  - Malaysian Armed Forces Day (Malaysia)
  - Malaysia Day (Malaysia, Singapore)
  - Martyrs' Day (Libya)
  - Heroes' Day (Saint Kitts and Nevis)
  - National Cinnamon Raisin Toast Day (United States)
  - National Guacamole Day (United States)
- September 17
  - Australian Citizenship Day
  - Constitution Day and Citizenship Day (United States) (observed on the previous Friday if it falls on a Saturday, the following Monday if on a Sunday)
  - Start of Constitution Week (United States), runs from September 17–23
  - Heroes' Day (Angola)
  - Marathwada Liberation Day (India)
  - National Apple Dumpling Day (United States)
  - National Monte Cristo Sandwich Day (United States)
  - Operation Market Garden Anniversary is still remembered with parachuting and dedications on this day. (Netherlands)
  - Teachers' Day (Honduras)
  - Von Steuben Day. (United States), weekend of the week of September 17.
- September 18
  - Day of National Music (Azerbaijan)
  - First day of Fiestas Patrias (Chile) or Dieciocho (Chile)
  - Island Language Day (Okinawa Prefecture, Japan)
  - National Cheeseburger Day (United States)
  - Navy Day (Croatia)
  - World Water Monitoring Day (International)
- September 19
  - Armed Forces Day (Chile)
  - Day of the First Public Appearance of the Slovak National Council
  - Feast of San Gennaro
  - Second day of Fiestas Patrias (Chile)
  - Independence Day (Saint Kitts and Nevis)
  - International Talk Like a Pirate Day
  - National Butterscotch Pudding Day (United States)
- September 20
  - Independence Day of South Ossetia (not fully recognized)
  - National Pepperoni Pizza Day (United States)
  - National Punch Day (United States)
  - National Rum Punch Day (United States)
  - National Youth Day (Thailand)
  - Oil Workers' Day (Azerbaijan)
  - Universal Children's Day (Germany)
- September 21
  - Feast of Matthew the Evangelist (Western Christianity)
  - Arbor Day (Brazil)
  - Commemoration of the Declaration of Martial Law (Philippines)
  - Customs Service Day (Poland)
  - Founder's Day and National Volunteer Day (Ghana)
  - Independence Day, celebrates the independence of Armenia from the Soviet Union in 1991.
  - Independence Day, celebrates the independence of Belize from the United Kingdom in 1981.
  - Independence Day, celebrates the independence of Malta from the United Kingdom in 1964.
  - International Day of Peace (International)
  - National Pecan Cookie Day (United States)
  - Acknowledgement of Earth, Wind, & Fire's "September"
  - Student's Day (Bolivia)
  - Victory over the Golden Horde in the Battle of Kulikovo (Russia)
- September 22
  - American Business Women's Day (United States)
  - Hobbit Day, the containing week is celebrated as Tolkien Week. (American Tolkien Society)
  - Independence Day, celebrates the independence of Bulgaria from the Ottoman Empire in 1908.
  - Independence Day, celebrates the independence of Mali from France in 1960.
  - OneWebDay, an annual day of Internet celebration and awareness, started in 2006.
  - Resistance Fighting Day (Estonia)
  - World Car-Free Day
- September 23
  - Grito de Lares (Puerto Rico)
  - Holocaust Memorial Day (Lithuania)
  - International Day of Sign Languages (International observance)
  - Kyrgyz Language Day (Kyrgyzstan)
  - National Day (Saudi Arabia)
  - Teachers' Day (Brunei)
- September 24
  - Armed Forces Day (Peru)
  - Constitution Day (Cambodia)
  - La Mercè (Barcelona)
  - Heritage Day (South Africa)
  - Independence Day (Guinea-Bissau)
  - Mahidol Day (Thailand)
  - National Punctuation Day (United States)
  - New Caledonia Day (New Caledonia)
  - Republic Day (Trinidad and Tobago)
- September 25

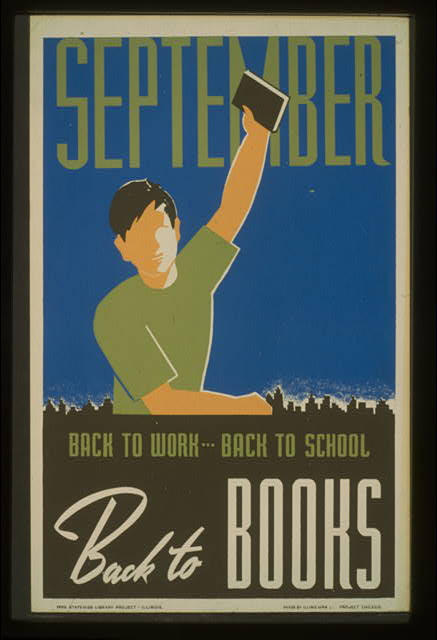
WPA poster, 1940

  - Day of National Recognition for the Harkis (France)
  - German Butterbrot Day (Germany)
  - National Lobster Day (United States)
  - National Youth Day (Nauru)
  - Revolution Day (Mozambique)
- September 26
  - Day of the National Flag (Ecuador)
  - Dominion Day (New Zealand)
  - European Day of Languages (European Union)
  - Johnny Appleseed Day (United States)
  - National Better Breakfast Day (United States)
  - National Dumpling Day (United States)
  - National Good Neighbor Day (United States)
  - National Pancake Day (United States)
  - Revolution Day (Yemen)
  - World Contraception Day
- September 27
  - Consumación de la Independencia (Mexico)
  - French Community Holiday (French community of Belgium)
  - Meskel (Ethiopian and Eritrean Orthodox Church, following Julian calendar, September 28 on leap years)
  - National Chocolate Milk Day (United States)
  - National Corned Beef Hash Day (United States)
  - National Gay Men's HIV/AIDS Awareness Day (United States)
  - Polish Underground State's Day (Poland)
  - World Tourism Day
- September 28
  - Ask a Stupid Question Day (United States)
  - Czech Statehood Day (Czech Republic)
  - Family Day – A Day to Eat Dinner with Your Children (United States)
  - Freedom from Hunger Day
  - International Right to Know Day
  - International Safe Abortion Day
  - Meskel (Ethiopian and Eritrean Orthodox Church, September 28 on leap years only, all other years is September 27)
  - National Day of Awareness and Unity against Child Pornography (Philippines)
  - Teachers' Day (Taiwan and Chinese-Filipino schools in the Philippines)
  - World Rabies Day
- September 29
  - Feast of the Archangels Michael, Gabriel, and Raphael.
  - National Biscotti Day (United States)
  - National Coffee Day (multiple countries, see article)
  - Inventors' Day (Argentina)
  - Michaelmas One of the four quarter days in the Irish calendar. (England and Ireland)
  - Victory of Boquerón Day (Paraguay)
  - World Heart Day
- September 30
  - Agricultural Reform (Nationalization) Day (São Tomé and Príncipe)
  - Birth of Morelos (Mexico)
  - Blasphemy Day (United States, Canada, other countries)
  - Boy's Day (Poland)
  - Independence Day (Botswana)
  - International Translation Day (International Federation of Translators)
  - National Hot Mulled Cider Day (United States)
  - Recovery Day (Canada)
  - Orange Shirt Day (Canada)
