= September 8 =

September 8 this year in various calendars
- Tuesday, 8 September 2026
| Akan | Fobene |
| Armenian | 20 Hoṙi 1476 |
| Aztec | Tititl 1, 8 Ātl |
| Babylonian | 25 Abu, 2337 SE |
| Balinese pawukon | Menga, Pasah, Jaya, Pon, Tungleh, Anggara of Menail, Guru, Dangu, Pandita |
| Bengali | 24 Bhadro, BS 1433 |
| Chinese | Yin Wood Rooster・Turtle Beak Mansion; Fire Horse Year, Month 7, Day 27 (Bailu, 15 days until Qiufen) |
| Common Era | 8 September 2026 CE |
| Coptic | 3 Nesi, AM 1742 |
| Egyptian | 25 Tybi, 2775 NE |
| Ethiopian | 3 Pāguemēn, 2018 Amätä Məhrät |
| French Republican | Décade III, Duodi de Fructidor de l'Année 234 de la République |
| Gregorian | 8 September, AD 2026 |
| Hebrew | 26 Elul, AM 5786 |
| Hindu | Puṣya・Varīyas; Solar: 23 Bhādrapada, 1948 SE; Lunisolar: Dvādaśī, Kṛishna pakṣa of Śrāvaṇa, 2083 VE; Rāudra・5127 KY・1,872,826 |
| Icelandic | Þriðjudagur, 15 Tvímánuður 2026 |
| Islamic | 25 Rabi' al-awwal, AH 1448 (using tabular method) |
| ISO week date | 2026-W37-2 |
| Japanese | 27 Fumizuki, Reiwa 8 (Hakuro, 15 days until Shūbun) |
| Julian | 26 August, AD 2026 (AM 7534) |
| Julian day | 2461292 |
| Korean | 27 Wonsungidal, 4359 DE |
| Maya | 13.0.13.16.9; 2 Chen, 8 Muluc |
| Roman | ante diem VII Kalendas Septembres, MMDCCLXXIX AUC |
| Solar Hijri | 17 Shahrivar, SH 1405 |
| Tibetan | 27 gro bzhin, me pho rta 2153 or 1772 or 1000 |

| << | September | | | | | >> |
| Su | Mo | Tu | We | Th | Fr | Sa |
| | | 1 | 2 | 3 | 4 | 5 |
| 6 | 7 | 8 | 9 | 10 | 11 | 12 |
| 13 | 14 | 15 | 16 | 17 | 18 | 19 |
| 20 | 21 | 22 | 23 | 24 | 25 | 26 |
| 27 | 28 | 29 | 30 |
2026

September 8 in recent years
2026 (Tuesday)
2025 (Monday)
2024 (Sunday)
2023 (Friday)
2022 (Thursday)
2021 (Wednesday)
2020 (Tuesday)
2019 (Sunday)
2018 (Saturday)
2017 (Friday)

September 8 is the 251st day of the year (252nd in leap years) in the Gregorian calendar; 114 days remain until the end of the year.

== Events ==
=== Pre-1600 ===
- 14 – The funeral of Augustus takes place. His body is cremated and placed in his mausoleum.
- 70 – After the capture of Herod's Palace the previous day, a Roman army under Titus secures and plunders the city of Jerusalem.
- 617 – Battle of Huoyi: Li Yuan defeats a Sui dynasty army, opening the path to his capture of the imperial capital Chang'an and the eventual establishment of the Tang dynasty.
- 1100 – Election of Antipope Theodoric.
- 1198 – Philip of Swabia, Prince of Hohenstaufen, is crowned King of Germany (King of the Romans).
- 1253 – Pope Innocent IV canonises Stanislaus of Szczepanów, who was killed by King Bolesław II.
- 1264 – The Statute of Kalisz, guaranteeing Jews safety and personal liberties and giving battei din jurisdiction over Jewish matters, is promulgated by Bolesław the Pious, Duke of Greater Poland.
- 1276 – Election of Pope John XXI following the sudden death of pope Hadrian V in the previous month. This was the third papal election that year as both predecessors of Pope John XXI died in the same year.
- 1331 – Stefan Dušan declares himself king of Serbia.
- 1334 – The Battle of Adramyttion begins in which a Christian naval league defeats a Turkish fleet in several encounters.
- 1380 – Battle of Kulikovo: Russian forces defeat a mixed army of Tatars and Mongols, stopping their advance.
- 1504 – Michelangelo's David is unveiled in Piazza della Signoria in Florence.
- 1514 – Battle of Orsha: In one of the biggest battles of the century, Lithuanians and Poles defeat the Russian army.
- 1522 – Magellan–Elcano circumnavigation: Victoria arrives at Seville, completing the first circumnavigation.
- 1565 – St. Augustine, Florida is founded by Spanish admiral and Florida's first governor, Pedro Menéndez de Avilés.

=== 1601–1900 ===
- 1655 – Warsaw falls without resistance to a small force under the command of Charles X Gustav of Sweden during The Deluge, making it the first time the city is captured by a foreign army.
- 1726 – J. S. Bach leads the first performance of Geist und Seele wird verwirret, BWV 35, a solo cantata for alto voice.
- 1727 – A barn fire during a puppet show in the village of Burwell in Cambridgeshire, England kills 78 people, many of whom are children.
- 1755 – French and Indian War: Battle of Lake George.
- 1756 – French and Indian War: Kittanning Expedition.
- 1760 – French and Indian War: French surrender Montreal to the British, completing the latter's conquest of New France.
- 1761 – Marriage of King George III of the United Kingdom to Duchess Charlotte of Mecklenburg-Strelitz.
- 1775 – The unsuccessful Rising of the Priests in Malta.
- 1781 – American Revolutionary War: The Battle of Eutaw Springs in South Carolina, the war's last significant battle in the Southern theater, ends in a narrow British tactical victory.
- 1793 – French Revolutionary Wars: Battle of Hondschoote.
- 1796 – French Revolutionary Wars: Battle of Bassano: French forces defeat Austrian troops at Bassano del Grappa.
- 1808 – The Treaty of Paris is signed ending the French military occupation of Prussia.
- 1810 – The Tonquin sets sail from New York Harbor with 33 employees of John Jacob Astor's newly created Pacific Fur Company on board.
- 1813 – At the final stage of the Peninsular War, British-Portuguese troops capture the town of Donostia (now San Sebastián), resulting in a rampage and eventual destruction of the town.
- 1819 – 1819 Balloon riot occurred at Vauxhall Garden in Philadelphia, PA and resulted in the destruction of the amusement park.
- 1831 – William IV and Adelaide of Saxe-Meiningen are crowned King and Queen of the United Kingdom of Great Britain and Ireland.
- 1831 – November uprising: The Battle of Warsaw effectively ends the Polish insurrection.
- 1855 – Crimean War: The French assault the tower of Malakoff, leading to the capture of Sevastopol.
- 1860 – The steamship PS Lady Elgin sinks on Lake Michigan, with the loss of around 300 lives.
- 1862 – Millennium of Russia monument is unveiled in Novgorod.
- 1863 – American Civil War: In the Second Battle of Sabine Pass, a small Confederate force thwarts a Union invasion of Texas.
- 1883 – The Northern Pacific Railway (reporting mark NP) was completed in a ceremony at Gold Creek, Montana. Former president Ulysses S. Grant drove in the final "golden spike" in an event attended by rail and political luminaries.
- 1888 – Isaac Peral's submarine is first tested.
- 1888 – The Great Herding (Spanish: El Gran Arreo) begins with thousands of sheep being herded from the Argentine outpost of Fortín Conesa to Santa Cruz near the Strait of Magellan.
- 1888 – In London, the body of Jack the Ripper's second murder victim, Annie Chapman, is found.
- 1888 – In England, the first six Football League matches are played.
- 1892 – The Pledge of Allegiance is first recited.
- 1898 – Seven hundred Greek civilians, 17 British guards and the British Consul of Crete are killed by a Turkish mob.
- 1900 – Galveston hurricane: A powerful hurricane hits Galveston, Texas killing about 8,000 people.

=== 1901–present ===
- 1905 – The 7.2 M_{w} Calabria earthquake shakes southern Italy with a maximum Mercalli intensity of XI (Extreme), killing between 557 and 2,500 people.
- 1914 – World War I: Private Thomas Highgate becomes the first British soldier to be executed for desertion during the war.
- 1916 – In a bid to prove that women were capable of serving as military dispatch riders, Augusta and Adeline Van Buren arrive in Los Angeles, completing a 60-day, 5,500 mile cross-country trip on motorcycles.
- 1921 – Margaret Gorman, a 16-year-old, wins the Atlantic City Pageant's Golden Mermaid trophy; pageant officials later dubbed her the first Miss America.
- 1923 – Honda Point disaster: Nine US Navy destroyers run aground off the California coast. Seven are lost, and twenty-three sailors killed.
- 1925 – Rif War: Spanish forces including troops from the Foreign Legion under Colonel Francisco Franco landing at Al Hoceima, Morocco.
- 1926 – Germany is admitted to the League of Nations.
- 1933 – Ghazi bin Faisal became King of Iraq.
- 1934 – Off the New Jersey coast, a fire aboard the passenger liner SS Morro Castle kills 137 people.
- 1935 – US Senator from Louisiana Huey Long is fatally shot in the Louisiana State Capitol building.
- 1941 – World War II: German forces begin the Siege of Leningrad.
- 1943 – World War II: The Armistice of Cassibile is proclaimed by radio. OB Süd immediately implements plans to disarm the Italian forces.
- 1944 – World War II: London is hit by a V-2 rocket for the first time.
- 1945 – The division of Korea begins when United States troops arrive to partition the southern part of Korea in response to Soviet troops occupying the northern part of the peninsula a month earlier.
- 1946 – A referendum abolishes the monarchy in Bulgaria.
- 1948 – The flag of North Korea is adopted with the passing of the country's first constitution by the Supreme People's Assembly.
- 1952 – The Canadian Broadcasting Corporation makes its first televised broadcast on the second escape of the Boyd Gang.
- 1954 – The Southeast Asia Treaty Organization (SEATO) is established.
- 1960 – In Huntsville, Alabama, US President Dwight D. Eisenhower formally dedicates the Marshall Space Flight Center (NASA had already activated the facility on July 1).
- 1962 – Last run of the famous Pines Express over the Somerset and Dorset Railway line (UK) fittingly using the last steam locomotive built by British Railways, BR Standard Class 9F 92220 Evening Star.
- 1966 – The landmark American science fiction television series Star Trek premieres with its first-aired episode, "The Man Trap".
- 1970 – Trans International Airlines Flight 863 crashes during takeoff from John F. Kennedy International Airport in New York City, killing all 11 aboard.
- 1971 – In Washington, D.C., the John F. Kennedy Center for the Performing Arts is inaugurated, with the opening feature being the premiere of Leonard Bernstein's Mass.
- 1973 – World Airways Flight 802 crashes into Mount Dutton in King Cove, Alaska, killing six people.
- 1974 – Watergate scandal: US President Gerald Ford signs the pardon of Richard Nixon for any crimes Nixon may have committed while in office.
- 1975 – Gays in the military: US Air Force Tech Sergeant Leonard Matlovich, a decorated veteran of the Vietnam War, appears in his Air Force uniform on the cover of Time magazine with the headline "I Am A Homosexual". He is given a general discharge, later upgraded to honorable.
- 1978 – Black Friday, a massacre by soldiers against protesters in Tehran, results in 88 deaths, it marks the beginning of the end of the monarchy in Iran.
- 1986 – Nicholas Daniloff, a correspondent for U.S. News & World Report, is indicted on charges of espionage by the Soviet Union.
- 1988 – Yellowstone National Park is closed for the first time in U.S. history due to ongoing fires.
- 1989 – Partnair Flight 394 dives into the North Sea, killing 55 people. The investigation showed that the tail of the plane vibrated loose in flight due to sub-standard connecting bolts that had been fraudulently sold as aircraft-grade.
- 1994 – USAir Flight 427, on approach to Pittsburgh International Airport, suddenly crashes in clear weather killing all 132 aboard, resulting in the most extensive aviation investigation in world history and altering manufacturing practices in the industry.
- 2000 – NASA launches Space Shuttle Atlantis on STS-106 to resupply the International Space Station.
- 2004 – NASA's uncrewed spacecraft Genesis crash-lands when its parachute fails to open.
- 2005 – Two Ilyushin Il-76 aircraft from EMERCOM land at a disaster aid staging area at Little Rock Air Force Base; the first time Russia has flown such a mission to North America.
- 2016 – NASA launches OSIRIS-REx, its first asteroid sample return mission. The probe visited 101955 Bennu and returned with samples in September 2023.
- 2017 – Syrian civil war: The Syrian Democratic Forces (SDF) announce the beginning of the Deir ez-Zor campaign, with the stated aim of eliminating the Islamic State (IS) from all areas north and east of the Euphrates.
- 2022 – Queen Elizabeth II of the United Kingdom dies at Balmoral Castle in Scotland after reigning for 70 years. Her son Charles, Prince of Wales, ascends the throne upon her death as Charles III.
- 2023 – A magnitude 6.9 earthquake strikes Morocco, killing nearly 3,000 people and damaging historic sites in Marrakesh.
- 2023 – The 2023 Rugby World Cup, the tenth men's Rugby World Cup is held in France. The opening ceremony, directed and written by Jean Dujardin, Olivier Ferracci and Nora Matthey, took place at the Stade de France in Saint-Denis, before the opening match between France and New Zealand, which saw the host nation winning 27 to 13.
- 2025 – Balçova police station shooting: Four people, including the perpetrator are killed an attack on a police station in Turkey.

== Births ==
=== Pre-1600 ===
- 685 – Emperor Xuanzong of Tang (died 762)
- 801 – Ansgar, German archbishop and saint (died 865)
- 828 – Ali al-Hadi, Hijazi (Western Arabian), 10th of the Twelve Imams (died 868)
- 1157 – Richard I of England (died 1199)
- 1209 – Sancho II of Portugal (died 1248)
- 1271 – Charles Martel of Anjou (died 1295)
- 1380 – Bernardino of Siena, Italian priest, missionary, and saint (died 1444)
- 1413 – Catherine of Bologna, Italian nun and saint (died 1463)
- 1442 – John de Vere, 13th Earl of Oxford, English commander and politician, Lord Great Chamberlain of England (died 1513)
- 1462 – Henry Medwall, first known English vernacular dramatist (died 1501)
- 1474 – Ludovico Ariosto, Italian playwright and poet (died 1533)
- 1515 – Alfonso Salmeron, Spanish priest and scholar (died 1585)
- 1588 – Marin Mersenne, French mathematician, philosopher, and theologian (died 1648)
- 1593 – Toyotomi Hideyori, Japanese nobleman (died 1615)

=== 1601–1900 ===
- 1611 – Johann Friedrich Gronovius, German scholar and critic (died 1671)
- 1621 – Louis, Grand Condé, French general (died 1686)
- 1633 – Ferdinand IV, King of the Romans (died 1654)
- 1672 – Nicolas de Grigny, French organist and composer (died 1703)
- 1698 – François Francoeur, French violinist and composer (died 1787)
- 1742 – Ozias Humphry, English painter and academic (died 1810)
- 1749 – Yolande de Polastron, French educator (died 1793)
- 1750 – Tanikaze Kajinosuke, Japanese sumo wrestler, the 4th Yokozuna (died 1795)
- 1752 – Carl Stenborg, Swedish opera singer, actor, and director (died 1813)
- 1767 – August Wilhelm Schlegel, German poet and critic (died 1845)
- 1774 – Anne Catherine Emmerich, German nun and mystic (died 1824)
- 1779 – Mustafa IV, Ottoman sultan (died 1808)
- 1783 – N. F. S. Grundtvig, Danish pastor, philosopher, and author (died 1872)
- 1804 – Eduard Mörike, German pastor, poet, and academic (died 1875)
- 1814 – Charles Étienne Brasseur de Bourbourg, French archaeologist, ethnographer, and historian (died 1874)
- 1815 – Giuseppina Strepponi, Italian soprano and educator (died 1897)
- 1822 – Karl von Ditmar, German geologist and explorer (died 1892)
- 1824 – Jaime Nunó, Spanish-American composer, conductor, and director (died 1908)
- 1828 – Joshua Chamberlain, American general and politician, 32nd Governor of Maine (died 1914)
- 1828 – Clarence Cook, American author and critic (died 1900)
- 1830 – Frédéric Mistral, French poet and lexicographer, Nobel Prize laureate (died 1914)
- 1831 – Wilhelm Raabe, German author and painter (died 1910)
- 1841 – Antonín Dvořák, Czech composer and academic (died 1904)
- 1841 – Charles J. Guiteau, American assassin of president James A. Garfield (died 1882)
- 1846 – Paul Chater, Indian-Hong Kong businessman and politician (died 1926)
- 1851 – John Jenkins, American-Australian businessman and politician, 22nd Premier of South Australia (died 1923)
- 1852 – Gojong of Korea, 26th Emperor of the Joseon Kingdom and first emperor of Korea (died 1919)
- 1857 – Georg Michaelis, German academic and politician, 6th Chancellor of Germany (died 1936)
- 1863 – Mary of the Divine Heart, German nun and saint (died 1899)
- 1863 – W.W. Jacobs, English novelist and short story writer (died 1943)
- 1867 – Alexander Parvus, Belarusian-German theoretician and activist (died 1924)
- 1868 – Seth Weeks, American mandolin player, composer, and bandleader (died 1953)
- 1869 – José María Pino Suárez, Mexican politician, Vice President of Mexico, murdered in a military coup (died 1913)
- 1871 – Samuel McLaughlin, Canadian businessman and philanthropist, founded the McLaughlin Carriage Company (died 1972)
- 1872 – James William McCarthy, American judge (died 1939)
- 1873 – Alfred Jarry, French author and playwright (died 1907)
- 1873 – David O. McKay, American religious leader, 9th President of The Church of Jesus Christ of Latter-day Saints (died 1970)
- 1876 – Inez Knight Allen, Mormon missionary and Utah politician (died 1937)
- 1881 – Harry Hillman, American runner and hurdler (died 1945)
- 1881 – Refik Saydam, Turkish physician and politician, 5th Prime Minister of Turkey (died 1942)
- 1884 – Théodore Pilette, Belgian racing driver (died 1921)
- 1886 – Siegfried Sassoon, English soldier, poet and author (died 1967)
- 1886 – Ninon Vallin, French soprano and actress (died 1961)
- 1887 – Sivananda Saraswati, Hindu monk, spiritual leader, physician, proponent of Vedanta, etc. (died 1963)
- 1888 – Ida McNeil, American broadcaster and designer of the flag of South Dakota (died 1974)
- 1889 – Robert A. Taft, American lawyer and politician (died 1953)
- 1894 – Willem Pijper, Dutch composer and critic (died 1947)
- 1896 – Howard Dietz, American publicist and songwriter (died 1983)
- 1897 – Jimmie Rodgers, American singer-songwriter and guitarist (died 1933)
- 1900 – Claude Pepper, American lawyer and politician (died 1989)

=== 1901–present ===
- 1901 – Hendrik Verwoerd, Dutch-South African journalist and politician, 7th Prime Minister of South Africa (died 1966)
- 1905 – Eino Tainio, Finnish politician (died 1970)
- 1906 – Andrei Kirilenko, Russian engineer and politician (died 1990)
- 1907 – William Wentworth, Australian economist and politician, 11th Australian Minister for Human Services (died 2003)
- 1909 – Józef Noji, Polish runner (died 1943)
- 1910 – Jean-Louis Barrault, French actor and director (died 1994)
- 1914 – Patriarch Demetrios I of Constantinople (died 1991)
- 1914 – Denys Lasdun, English architect, designed the Royal National Theatre (died 2001)
- 1915 – N. V. M. Gonzalez, Filipino novelist, poet, and writer (died 1999)
- 1917 – Jan Sedivka, Czech-Australian violinist and educator (died 2009)
- 1918 – Derek Barton, English-American chemist and academic, Nobel Prize laureate (died 1998)
- 1919 – Gianni Brera, Italian journalist and author (died 1992)
- 1919 – Maria Lassnig, Austrian painter and academic (died 2014)
- 1921 – Harry Secombe, Welsh-English singer and actor (died 2001)
- 1921 – Dinko Šakić, Croatian concentration camp commander (died 2008)
- 1922 – Sid Caesar, American comic actor and writer (died 2014)
- 1922 – Lyndon LaRouche, American politician and activist, founded the LaRouche movement (died 2019)
- 1923 – Rasul Gamzatov, Russian poet (died 2003)
- 1923 – Wilbur Ware, American double-bassist (died 1979)
- 1924 – Wendell H. Ford, American politician, 53rd Governor of Kentucky (died 2015)
- 1924 – Marie-Claire Kirkland, American-Canadian lawyer, judge, and politician (died 2016)
- 1924 – Grace Metalious, American author (died 1964)
- 1924 – Mimi Parent, Canadian-Swiss painter (died 2005)
- 1925 – Jacqueline Ceballos, American activist, founded the Veteran Feminists of America
- 1925 – Peter Sellers, English actor and comedian (died 1980)
- 1926 – Bhupen Hazarika, Indian singer-songwriter, poet, and director (died 2011)
- 1927 – Harlan Howard, American songwriter (died 2002)
- 1927 – Robert L. Rock, American politician, 42nd Lieutenant Governor of Indiana (died 2013)
- 1927 – Marguerite Frank, American-French mathematician (died 2024)
- 1929 – Christoph von Dohnányi, German conductor (died 2025)
- 1930 – Nguyễn Cao Kỳ, Vietnamese general and politician, 16th Prime Minister of the Republic of Vietnam (died 2011)
- 1931 – Marion Brown, American saxophonist and composer (died 2010)
- 1931 – John Garrett, English politician (died 2007)
- 1932 – Patsy Cline, American singer-songwriter and pianist (died 1963)
- 1933 – Asha Bhosle, Indian playback singer, businesswoman, actress and television personality (died 2026)
- 1933 – Michael Frayn, English author and playwright
- 1933 – Jeffrey Koo Sr., Taiwanese banker and businessman (died 2012)
- 1933 – Eric Salzman, American composer, producer, and critic (died 2017)
- 1933 – Maigonis Valdmanis, Latvian basketball player and coach (died 1999)
- 1934 – Rodrigue Biron, Canadian politician (died 2025)
- 1934 – Ross Brown, New Zealand rugby player (died 2014)
- 1934 – Peter Maxwell Davies, English composer and conductor (died 2016)
- 1934 – Bernard Donoughue, Baron Donoughue, English academic and politician
- 1936 – Roy Newman, English admiral
- 1937 – Edna Adan Ismail, Somaliland politician and activist
- 1937 – Barbara Frum, American-Canadian journalist (died 1992)
- 1937 – Archie Goodwin, American author and illustrator (died 1998)
- 1937 – Les Wexner, American businessman
- 1938 – Adrian Cronauer, American sergeant and radio host (died 2018)
- 1938 – Kenichi Horie, Japanese sailor
- 1938 – Sam Nunn, American lawyer and politician
- 1939 – Carsten Keller, German field hockey player and coach
- 1939 – Guitar Shorty, American singer and guitarist (died 2022)
- 1940 – Quentin L. Cook, American religious leader
- 1940 – Jerzy Robert Nowak, Polish historian and journalist
- 1940 – Jack Prelutsky, American author and poet
- 1941 – Bernie Sanders, American politician
- 1942 – David Botstein, Swiss-American molecular biologist, discovered a way to locate genes in human DNA (died 2026)
- 1942 – Judith Hann, English journalist and author
- 1942 – Sal Valentino, American rock singer-songwriter and guitarist
- 1943 – Adelaide C. Eckardt, American academic and politician
- 1944 – Margaret Hodge, English economist and politician
- 1945 – Kelly Groucutt, English bass player (died 2009)
- 1945 – Ron "Pigpen" McKernan, American singer-songwriter and keyboard player (died 1973)
- 1945 – Vinko Puljić, Croatian cardinal
- 1945 – Rogie Vachon, Canadian ice hockey player and coach
- 1946 – Aziz Sancar, Turkish-American biologist and academic, Nobel Prize laureate
- 1946 – Wong Kan Seng, Singaporean business executive, former Deputy Prime Minister of Singapore
- 1947 – Halldór Ásgrímsson, Icelandic accountant and politician, 22nd Prime Minister of Iceland (died 2015)
- 1947 – Ann Beattie, American novelist and short story writer
- 1947 – Benjamin Orr, American singer-songwriter and bass player (died 2000)
- 1947 – Marianne Wiggins, American author
- 1948 – Jean-Pierre Monseré, Belgian cyclist (died 1971)
- 1949 – Ian Davidson, Scottish lawyer and politician
- 1950 – James Mattis, 26th United States Secretary of Defense under the Trump administration (2017-2019)
- 1950 – Zachary Richard, American Cajun and zydeco singer-songwriter, guitarist, accordion player, and poet
- 1951 – Tim Gullikson, American tennis player and coach (died 1996)
- 1951 – Tom Gullikson, American tennis player and coach
- 1951 – John McDonnell, English politician
- 1951 – Dezső Ránki, Hungarian pianist
- 1952 – Will Lee, American bass player
- 1952 – Graham Mourie, New Zealand rugby player
- 1953 – Pascal Greggory, French actor
- 1953 – Stein-Erik Olsen, Norwegian guitarist
- 1953 – Esther Sans Takeuchi, American scientist and engineer (invented batteries for implantable cardioverter defibrillators)
- 1954 – Ruby Bridges, American civil rights activist
- 1954 – Johan Harmenberg, Swedish Olympic and world champion épée fencer
- 1954 – Michael Shermer, American historian, author, and academic, founded The Skeptics Society
- 1955 – David O'Halloran, Australian footballer (died 2013)
- 1955 – Terry Tempest Williams, American environmentalist and author
- 1956 – Mick Brown, American drummer
- 1956 – David Carr, American journalist and author (died 2015)
- 1956 – Maurice Cheeks, American basketball player and coach
- 1956 – Stefan Johansson, Swedish racing driver
- 1957 – Walt Easley, American football player (died 2013)
- 1957 – Heather Thomas, American actress and activist
- 1960 – Aimee Mann, American singer-songwriter, guitarist, and actress
- 1960 – David Steele, English bass player and songwriter
- 1960 – Aguri Suzuki, Japanese racing driver
- 1961 – Timothy Well, American wrestler (died 2017)
- 1962 – Thomas Kretschmann, German actor
- 1963 – Alexandros Alexiou, Greek footballer
- 1963 – Daniel Wolpert, American scientist
- 1964 – Michael Johns, American businessman and political activist
- 1964 – Joachim Nielsen, Norwegian singer-songwriter and guitarist (died 2000)
- 1964 – Raven, American wrestler
- 1965 – Tutilo Burger, German Benedictine monk and abbot
- 1965 – Darlene Zschech, Australian singer-songwriter and pastor
- 1966 – Peter Furler, Australian singer-songwriter, guitarist, and producer
- 1967 – Eerik-Niiles Kross, Estonian politician and diplomat
- 1967 – James Packer, Australian businessman
- 1967 – Kimberly Peirce, American director, producer, and screenwriter
- 1968 – Wolfram Klein, German footballer
- 1968 – Ray Wilson, Scottish singer-songwriter and guitarist
- 1969 – Lars Bohinen, Norwegian footballer and manager
- 1969 – Oswaldo Ibarra, Ecuadorian footballer
- 1969 – Chris Powell, English footballer and manager
- 1969 – Gary Speed, Welsh footballer and manager (died 2011)
- 1970 – Neko Case, American singer-songwriter and guitarist
- 1970 – Paul DiPietro, Canadian-Swiss ice hockey player
- 1970 – Nidal Hasan, American soldier, psychiatrist, and mass murderer
- 1970 – Latrell Sprewell, American basketball player
- 1970 – Lodi, American wrestler
- 1970 – Andy Ward, Irish rugby player and coach
- 1970 – John Welborn, Australian rugby player
- 1971 – David Arquette, American actor, director, producer, screenwriter, and wrestler
- 1971 – Brooke Burke, American actress and television personality
- 1971 – Martin Freeman, English actor
- 1971 – Lachlan Murdoch, English-Australian businessman
- 1971 – Dustin O'Halloran, American pianist and composer
- 1971 – Daniel Petrov, Bulgarian boxer
- 1971 – Pierre Sévigny, Canadian ice hockey player and coach
- 1972 – Markus Babbel, German footballer and manager
- 1972 – Os du Randt, South African rugby player and coach
- 1972 – Kennedy, American radio and television host
- 1973 – Khamis Al-Dosari, Saudi Arabian footballer (died 2020)
- 1973 – Gabrial McNair, American saxophonist, keyboard player, and composer
- 1973 – Troy Sanders, American singer-songwriter and bass player
- 1973 – Matteo Strukul, Italian writer and journalist
- 1974 – Marios Agathokleous, Cypriot footballer
- 1974 – Tanaz Eshaghian, Iranian-American director and producer
- 1974 – Braulio Luna, Mexican footballer
- 1974 – Rick Michaels, American wrestler
- 1975 – Lee Eul-yong, South Korean footballer and manager
- 1975 – Richard Hughes, English drummer
- 1975 – Chris Latham, Australian rugby player
- 1975 – Elena Likhovtseva, Russian tennis player
- 1975 – Larenz Tate, American actor, director, and producer
- 1976 – Gerald Drummond, Costa Rican footballer
- 1976 – Jervis Drummond, Costa Rican footballer
- 1976 – Sjeng Schalken, Dutch tennis player
- 1977 – Daphné Collignon, French comic book author
- 1977 – Asami Sanada, Japanese actress
- 1977 – Jason Collier, American basketball player (died 2005)
- 1977 – Nate Corddry, American actor and comedian
- 1977 – Jay McKee, Canadian ice hockey player and coach
- 1978 – Lucilla Agosti, Italian radio and television presenter and actress
- 1978 – Gerard Autet, Spanish footballer and manager
- 1978 – Emanuele Ferraro, Italian footballer
- 1978 – Gil Meche, American baseball player
- 1978 – Angela Rawlings, Canadian-American author and poet
- 1978 – Rebel, American wrestler
- 1978 – Marco Sturm, German ice hockey player and coach
- 1979 – Pink, American singer-songwriter, producer, and actress
- 1980 – Eric Hutchinson, American singer-songwriter
- 1981 – Kate Abdo, English journalist
- 1981 – Selim Benachour, Tunisian footballer
- 1981 – Morten Gamst Pedersen, Norwegian footballer
- 1981 – Jonathan Taylor Thomas, American actor
- 1982 – Travis Daniels, American football player
- 1983 – Kate Beaton, Canadian cartoonist
- 1983 – Elena Semikina, Moldovan Canadian actress, model, producer and beauty pageant titleholder
- 1983 – Anastasia Phillips, Canadian actress
- 1983 – Toni Street, New Zealand television presenter and sports commentator
- 1983 – Melissa St. Vil, American professional boxer
- 1983 – Diego Benaglio, Swiss footballer
- 1983 – Will Blalock, American basketball player
- 1983 – Nick Hundley, American baseball player
- 1983 – Chris Judd, Australian footballer
- 1983 – Jason Mattera, American writer and conservative activist
- 1983 – Lewis Roberts-Thomson, Australian footballer
- 1983 – Sarah Stup, American writer and autism activist
- 1984 – Vitaly Petrov, Russian racing driver
- 1984 – Tiago Treichel, Brazilian footballer
- 1984 – Peter Whittingham, English footballer (died 2020)
- 1986 – Carlos Bacca, Colombian footballer
- 1986 – João Moutinho, Portuguese footballer
- 1987 – Alexandre Bilodeau, Canadian skier
- 1987 – Derrick Brown, American basketball player
- 1987 – Wiz Khalifa, American rapper and actor
- 1987 – Marcel Nguyen, German gymnast
- 1988 – Ekaterina Smirnova, Russian female sprinter
- 1988 – Agustina Lepore, Argentine tennis player
- 1988 – Rie Kaneto, Japanese swimmer
- 1989 – Gylfi Sigurðsson, Icelandic footballer
- 1989 – Avicii, Swedish electronic musician (died 2018)
- 1990 – Jos Buttler, English cricketer
- 1990 – Gerrit Cole, American baseball player
- 1990 – Matthew Dellavedova, Australian basketball player
- 1990 – Dianne Doan, Canadian actress
- 1990 – Michal Kempný, Czech ice hockey player
- 1990 – Tokelo Rantie, South African footballer
- 1991 – Benedetta Scuderi, Swiss ice hockey player
- 1992 – Nino Niederreiter, Swiss ice hockey player
- 1992 – Marianna Liik, Estonian composer
- 1992 – Temi Fagbenle, British professional basketball player
- 1992 – Za'Darius Smith, American football player
- 1993 – Lily Sullivan, Australian cricketer
- 1993 – Amanda Zahui B., Swedish basketball player
- 1993 – Nathalie Lesage, Mauritian beauty pageant titleholder
- 1993 – Tamara de Sousa, Brazilian heptathlete
- 1993 – Elena Di Liddo, Italian swimmer
- 1993 – Magdalena Eriksson, Swedish professional footballer
- 1994 – Ćamila Mičijević, Croatian-Bosnian handball player
- 1994 – Alayna Treene, American journalist
- 1994 – Azumi Waki, Japanese voice actress and singer
- 1994 – Paula Nicart, Spanish former footballer
- 1994 – Oleksandr Korpan, Ukrainian military pilot
- 1994 – Gonzalo Piovi, American internet personality
- 1994 – Ghayas Zahid, Irish professional footballer
- 1994 – Shane Griffin, Norwegian professional footballer
- 1994 – George Honeyman, American professional basketball player
- 1994 – Karan Kaila, Indian cricketer
- 1994 – Ivan Ntege, Ugandan professional footballer
- 1994 – Alan Techer, French champion solo motorcycle racer
- 1994 – Dennis Slamar, German footballer
- 1994 – Valeriy Boldenkov, Ukrainian footballer
- 1994 – Rigoberto Sanchez, American professional football punter and kickoff specialist
- 1994 – Sebastian Stasiak, Polish modern pentathlete
- 1994 – Yassine Benzia, Algeria professional footballer
- 1994 – Daiya Maekawa, Japanese professional footballer
- 1994 – Stuart Moore, English professional footballer
- 1994 – Ye Chugui, Chinese football player
- 1994 – Jorge Eduardo, Brazilian professional footballer
- 1994 – Dujon Mario Edwards, Jamaican and dancehall artist
- 1994 – Timotheos Pavlou, Cypriot footballer
- 1994 – Taro Kondo, Japanese speed skater
- 1994 – Jeff-Denis Fehr, German footballer
- 1994 – Nicky Walker, English professional footballer
- 1994 – Bruno Fernandes, Portuguese footballer
- 1994 – Jillian Alleyne, American professional basketball player
- 1995 – Ellie Black, Canadian gymnast
- 1995 – Kimberley Woods, British slalom canoeist
- 1995 – Celya AB, French stand-up comedian, writer and actress based in England
- 1995 – Maya Kingma, Dutch triathlete
- 1996 – Tim Gajser, Slovenian motocross racer
- 1996 – Catherine Mbengono, Cameroonian footballer
- 1997 – Tessa, Danish rapper
- 1997 – Lars Nootbaar, American baseball player
- 1998 – Sierra Capri, American actress
- 1998 – Chelsea Gubecka, Australian swimmer
- 1998 – Emma Laird, English actress
- 1998 – Georgie Gleeson, Australian representative
- 1998 – Matheus Leist, Brazilian racing driver
- 1999 – Ellie Kildunne, English rugby player
- 1999 – Vivianne Härri, Swiss alpine skier
- 1999 – Shubman Gill, Indian cricketer
- 2000 – Zak Butters, Australian footballer
- 2000 – Miles McBride, American basketball player
- 2001 – Bill Mamadou, Singaporean footballer
- 2002 – Gaten Matarazzo, American actor and singer
- 2003 – Nicolas Cantu, American actor and internet personality
- 2004 – Lewis Hall, English footballer

== Deaths ==
=== Pre-1600 ===
- 394 – Arbogast, Frankish general
- 701 – Pope Sergius I (born 650)
- 780 – Leo IV the Khazar, Byzantine emperor (born 750)
- 869 – Ahmad ibn Isra'il al-Anbari, Muslim vizier
- 1100 – Antipope Clement III (born 1029)
- 1306 – Sir Simon Fraser, Scottish knight, hung drawn and quartered by the English
- 1397 – Thomas of Woodstock, 1st Duke of Gloucester, English politician, Lord High Constable of England (born 1355)
- 1425 – Charles III of Navarre (born 1361)
- 1478 – Seraphina Sforza, Italian nun (born 1434)
- 1539 – John Stokesley, English bishop (born 1475)
- 1555 – Saint Thomas of Villanueva, Spanish bishop and saint (born 1488)
- 1560 – Amy Robsart, English noblewoman (born 1536)

=== 1601–1900 ===
- 1613 – Carlo Gesualdo, Italian lute player and composer (born 1566)
- 1637 – Robert Fludd, English physician, mathematician, and cosmologist (born 1574)
- 1644 – John Coke, English civil servant and politician (born 1563)
- 1644 – Francis Quarles, English poet and author (born 1592)
- 1645 – Francisco de Quevedo, Spanish poet and politician (born 1580)
- 1656 – Joseph Hall, English bishop (born 1574)
- 1682 – Juan Caramuel y Lobkowitz, Spanish mathematician and philosopher (born 1606)
- 1721 – Michael Brokoff, Czech sculptor (born 1686)
- 1755 – Ephraim Williams, American soldier and philanthropist (born 1715)
- 1761 – Bernard Forest de Bélidor, French mathematician and engineer (born 1698)
- 1780 – Enoch Poor, American general (born 1736)
- 1784 – Ann Lee, English-American religious leader (born 1736)
- 1811 – Peter Simon Pallas, German zoologist and botanist (born 1741)
- 1814 – Maria Carolina of Austria, queen consort of Naples and Sicily (born 1752)
- 1831 – John Aitken, Scottish-American publisher (born 1745)
- 1853 – Frédéric Ozanam, French scholar, co-founded the Society of Saint Vincent de Paul (born 1813)
- 1873 – Johan Gabriel Ståhlberg, Finnish priest and father of K. J. Ståhlberg, the first President of Finland (born 1832)
- 1882 – Joseph Liouville, French mathematician and academic (born 1809)
- 1894 – Hermann von Helmholtz, German physician and physicist (born 1821)
- 1895 – Adam Opel, German entrepreneur, founded Opel (born 1837)

=== 1901–present ===
- 1909 – Vere St. Leger Goold, Irish tennis player (born 1853)
- 1912 – Eddie Hasha, American motorcycle racer (born 1890)
- 1916 – Friedrich Baumfelder, German pianist, composer, and conductor (born 1836)
- 1923 – Ugo Sivocci, Italian racing driver (born 1885)
- 1933 – Faisal I of Iraq (born 1883)
- 1935 – Carl Weiss, American physician (born 1906)
- 1940 – Hemmo Kallio, Finnish actor (born 1863)
- 1942 – Rıza Nur, Turkish surgeon and politician (born 1879)
- 1943 – Julius Fučík, Czech journalist (born 1903)
- 1944 – Jan van Gilse, Dutch composer and conductor (born 1881)
- 1949 – Richard Strauss, German composer and manager (born 1864)
- 1954 – André Derain, French painter and sculptor (born 1880)
- 1963 – Maurice Wilks, English engineer and businessman (born 1904)
- 1965 – Dorothy Dandridge, American actress and singer (born 1922)
- 1965 – Hermann Staudinger, German chemist and academic, Nobel Prize laureate (born 1881)
- 1966 – John Taylor, American race car driver (born 1933)
- 1969 – Bud Collyer, American game show host (born 1908)
- 1969 – Alexandra David-Néel, Belgian-French explorer and activist (born 1868)
- 1970 – Percy Spencer, American engineer, invented the microwave oven (born 1894)
- 1974 – Wolfgang Windgassen, French-German tenor (born 1914)
- 1977 – Zero Mostel, American actor and comedian (born 1915)
- 1980 – Willard Libby, American chemist and academic, Nobel Prize laureate (born 1908)
- 1981 – Nisargadatta Maharaj, Indian guru, philosopher, and educator (born 1897)
- 1981 – Roy Wilkins, American journalist and activist (born 1901)
- 1981 – Hideki Yukawa, Japanese physicist and academic, Nobel Prize laureate (born 1907)
- 1983 – Antonin Magne, French cyclist (born 1904)
- 1984 – Johnnie Parsons, American race car driver (born 1918)
- 1985 – John Franklin Enders, American virologist and academic, Nobel Prize laureate (born 1887)
- 1990 – Denys Watkins-Pitchford, English author and illustrator (born 1905)
- 1991 – Alex North, American composer and conductor (born 1910)
- 1991 – Brad Davis, American actor (born 1949)
- 1997 – Derek Taylor, English journalist and author (born 1932)
- 1999 – Moondog, American-German singer-songwriter, drummer, and poet (born 1916)
- 2001 – Bill Ricker, Canadian entomologist and author (born 1908)
- 2002 – Laurie Williams, Jamaican cricketer (born 1968)
- 2003 – Leni Riefenstahl, German actress, director, producer, and screenwriter (born 1902)
- 2004 – Frank Thomas, American animator, voice actor, and screenwriter (born 1913)
- 2005 – Noel Cantwell, Irish cricketer, footballer, and manager (born 1932)
- 2006 – Hilda Bernstein, English-South African author and activist (born 1915)
- 2006 – Peter Brock, Australian racing driver and sportscaster (born 1945)
- 2007 – Vincent Serventy, Australian ornithologist, conservationist, and author (born 1916)
- 2009 – Aage Bohr, Danish physicist and academic, Nobel Prize laureate (born 1922)
- 2009 – Mike Bongiorno, American-Italian television host (born 1924)
- 2012 – Ronald Hamowy, Canadian historian and academic (born 1937)
- 2012 – Thomas Szasz, Hungarian-American psychiatrist and academic (born 1920)
- 2013 – Don Reichert, Canadian painter and photographer (born 1932)
- 2013 – Jean Véronis, French linguist, computer scientist, and blogger (born 1955)
- 2013 – Radoslav Rotković, Montenegrin historian (born 1928)
- 2014 – Marvin Barnes, American basketball player (born 1952)
- 2014 – S. Truett Cathy, American businessman, founder of Chick-fil-A (born 1921)
- 2014 – Sean O'Haire, American wrestler, mixed martial artist, and kick-boxer (born 1971)
- 2014 – Magda Olivero, Italian soprano (born 1910)
- 2014 – Gerald Wilson, American trumpet player and composer (born 1918)
- 2015 – Joaquín Andújar, Dominican baseball player (born 1952)
- 2015 – Joost Zwagerman, Dutch author and poet (born 1963)
- 2016 – Hannes Arch, Austrian race pilot (born 1967)
- 2016 – Dragiša Pešić, Montenegrin politician, 5th Prime Minister of the Federal Republic of Yugoslavia (born 1954)
- 2016 – Prince Buster, Jamaican singer-songwriter and producer (born 1938)
- 2017 – Pierre Bergé, French businessman (born 1930)
- 2017 – Jerry Pournelle, American author and journalist (born 1933)
- 2017 – Ljubiša Samardžić, Serbian actor and director (born 1936)
- 2017 – Don Williams, American musician (born 1939)
- 2018 – Gennadi Gagulia, Prime Minister of Abkhazia (born 1948)
- 2019 – S. Rajasekar, Indian cinematographer, film director, and actor (born 1957)
- 2021 – Luis Villafuerte, Filipino politician, former congressman and governor of Camarines Sur (born 1935)
- 2022 – Elizabeth II, Queen of the United Kingdom and other Commonwealth realms (born 1926)
- 2022 – Gwyneth Powell, English actress (born 1946)
- 2024 – Mauricio Arriaza Chicas, Salvadoran police officer (born 1964)
- 2024 – Ed Kranepool, American baseball player (born 1944)
- 2024 – Henny Moan, Norwegian actress (born 1936)
- 2024 – Zoot Money, English musician (born 1942)
- 2024 – Peter Renaday, American voice actor (born 1935)
- 2024 – Emi Shinohara, Japanese voice actress and singer (born 1963)
- 2026 – Tung Chee-hwa, Hong Kong politician and businessman, first Chief Executive of Hong Kong (born 1937)

== Holidays and observances ==
- Christian Feast Day:
  - Adrian and Natalia of Nicomedia (Roman Catholic Church)
  - Corbinian
  - Disibod
  - Blessed Frédéric Ozanam
  - Isaac of Armenia
  - Nativity of Mary (Roman Catholic Church), (Anglo-Catholicism)
    - Monti Fest (Mangalorean Catholic)
  - Our Lady of Charity
  - Our Lady of Covadonga (national holiday in Asturias)
  - Our Lady of Good Health of Vailankanni
  - Pope Sergius I
  - September 8 (Eastern Orthodox liturgics)
  - Feast Day of Our Lady of Meritxell (national holiday in Andorra)
- Accession Day (United Kingdom and the Commonwealth realms) (during the reign of Charles III)
- Independence Day (North Macedonia)
- International Literacy Day (International)
- Martyrs' Day (Afghanistan) (date may fall on September 9, follows a non-Gregorian calendar)
- National Day (Andorra), also the feast of Our Lady of Meritxell
- National Day (Asturias), also the feast of Our Lady of Covadonga
- National Day (Extremadura), also the feast of Our Lady of Guadalupe
- Star Trek Day (International observance)
- Victory Day (Pakistan)
- Victory Day, also the feast of Our Lady of Victories or il-Vittorja (Malta)
- World Physical Therapy Day
