= Class consciousness =

Awareness of one's social class

In sociology, class consciousness is the set of beliefs that persons hold regarding their social class or economic rank in society, the structure of their class, and their common class interests. According to Karl Marx, class consciousness is an awareness that is key to sparking a revolution which would "create a dictatorship of the proletariat, transforming it from a wage-earning, propertyless mass into the ruling class".

Although Marxists tend to focus on class consciousness (or its absence) among the proletariat, the upper classes in society can also think and act in a class-conscious way. As Leonard Fein pointed out, "The very rich have been well aware of their class privilege and have laboured mightily to protect and defend it".

== Marxist theory ==
Early in the 19th century, the labels "working classes" and "middle classes" were coming into common usage in British society. David Cody writes the following about this time period: "The old hereditary aristocracy, reinforced by the new gentry who owed their success to commerce, industry, and the professions, evolved into an 'upper class' (its consciousness formed in large part by the public schools and Universities) which tenaciously maintained control over the political system, depriving not only the working classes but the middle classes of a voice in the political process." As the Industrial Revolution progressed, the sharpening of socioeconomic divisions caused each group to become more acutely conscious of its position in the hierarchy.

While Karl Marx rarely used the term "class consciousness", he did distinguish between "class in itself", which is defined as a stratum of society sharing common grievances and a unified perspective; and "class for itself", which is defined as a stratum organized in active pursuit of its own interests.

Categorizing a person's social class can be a determinant for their awareness of it. Marxists categorize classes based on their relation to the means of production, especially on whether members of the class own capital. Non-Marxists differentiate society's various groups based on social stratification, i.e., income, race, gender, ethnicity, education, occupation, or status.

Whereas Marx believed the working class would gain class consciousness as a result of its experience of exploitation, later orthodox Marxism, in particular as formulated by Vladimir Lenin, argued that the working class, by itself, could develop only "trade union consciousness", which Lenin characterized in What Is to Be Done? as "the conviction that it is necessary to combine in unions, fight the employers, and strive to compel the government to pass necessary labour legislation." To overcome this (in Lenin's opinion) limited worldview, a vanguard party of the most politically advanced section of the working class was needed to help replace trade union consciousness with class consciousness.

== Criticism ==
The Polish political philosopher Leszek Kołakowski disputed the notion that class consciousness could be instilled from outside by a vanguard party. In Main Currents of Marxism and his other writings, he stated that in order to achieve a unity of theory and praxis, theory must not only tend toward reality in an attempt to change it; reality must also tend towards theory. Otherwise, the historical process leads a life of its own, while theorists make their own little theories, desperately waiting for some kind of possible influence over the historical process. Henceforth, reality itself must tend toward the theory, making it the "expression of the revolutionary process itself". In turn, a theory which has as its goal helping the proletariat achieve class consciousness must first be an "objective theory of class consciousness". However, theory in itself is insufficient, and ultimately relies on the struggle of humankind and of the proletariat for consciousness: the "objective theory of class consciousness is only the theory of its objective possibility".

Austrian School economist Ludwig von Mises asserted that "Marx confus[ed] the notions of caste and class". Mises allowed that class consciousness and the associated class struggle were valid concepts in some circumstances where rigid social castes exist, e.g., when slavery is legal and slaves have a common motive for wanting to end their disadvantaged status relative to other castes, but that class is an arbitrary distinction in capitalist society where there is equality before the law. Mises believed that under capitalism, one's wealth should not affect how one is treated by legislators, law enforcement, or the courts.

Class identity politics has been described as essentialist.

== Examples ==
- 1819 Balloon riot
- Haymarket affair
- 1934 West Coast waterfront strike
- Major League Baseball collusion
- World Economic Forum
- Bilderberg Meeting
- Occupy Wall Street

== See also ==
- False consciousness
- History and Class Consciousness
- Psychology of social class
- Class struggle
