= Newspaper bag =

Lightweight bag or sleeve used to wrap newspapers

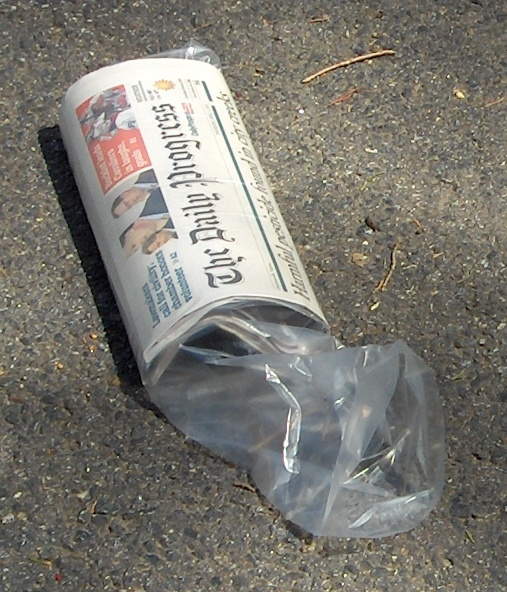
A newspaper in a protective plastic newspaper bag

A newspaper bag or newspaper sleeve is a lightweight bag or sleeve used to wrap newspapers to protect them from the elements. These bags are primarily made of polyethylene, although some distributors have moved to using biodegradable bags. These bags may be clear to display the newspaper inside, but are ordinarily imprinted with advertisements. Newspaper publishers may use bags as part of their standard preparation for delivery, or only during expected inclement weather. When used intermittently, paperboys would roll the papers and insert them in the plastic sleeves as part of their daily preparations.
