= Paperboy =

Boy who delivers newspapers

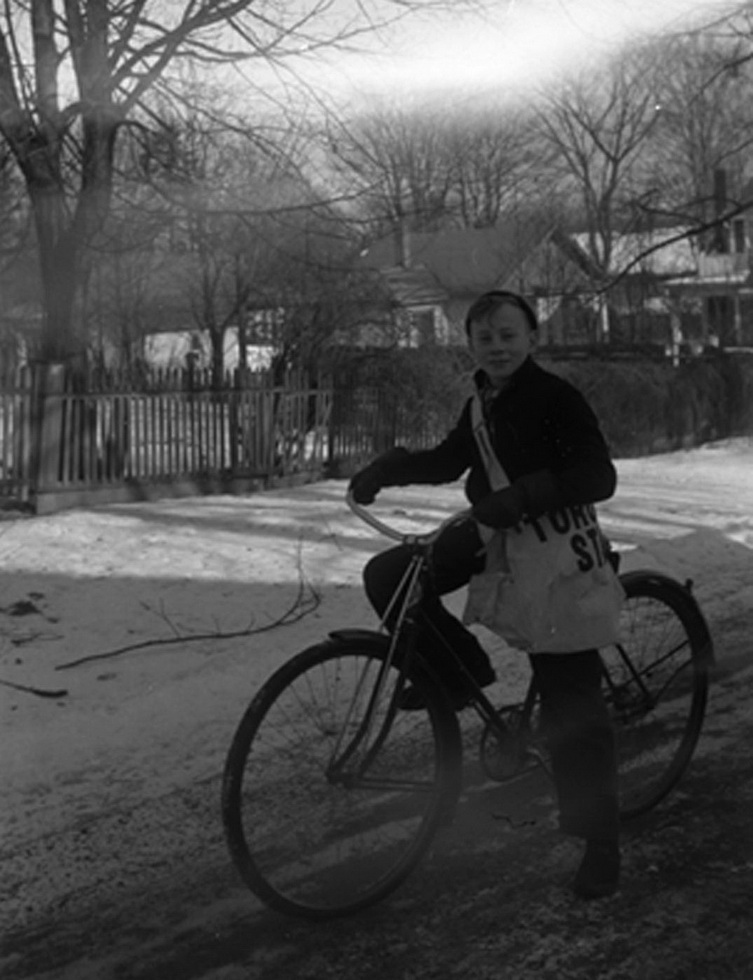
A paperboy for the Toronto Star in Whitby, Ontario, Canada, 1940

A paperboy is someone – often an older child or adolescent – who distributes printed newspapers to homes or offices on a regular route, usually by bicycle or automobile. In Western nations during the heyday of print newspapers during the early 20th century, this was often a young person's first job, perhaps undertaken before or after school. This contrasts with the newsboy or newspaper hawker, now extremely rare in Western nations, who would sell newspapers to passersby on the street, often with very vocal promotion. They were common when multiple daily papers in every city – as many as 50 in New York City alone – competed.

== History ==
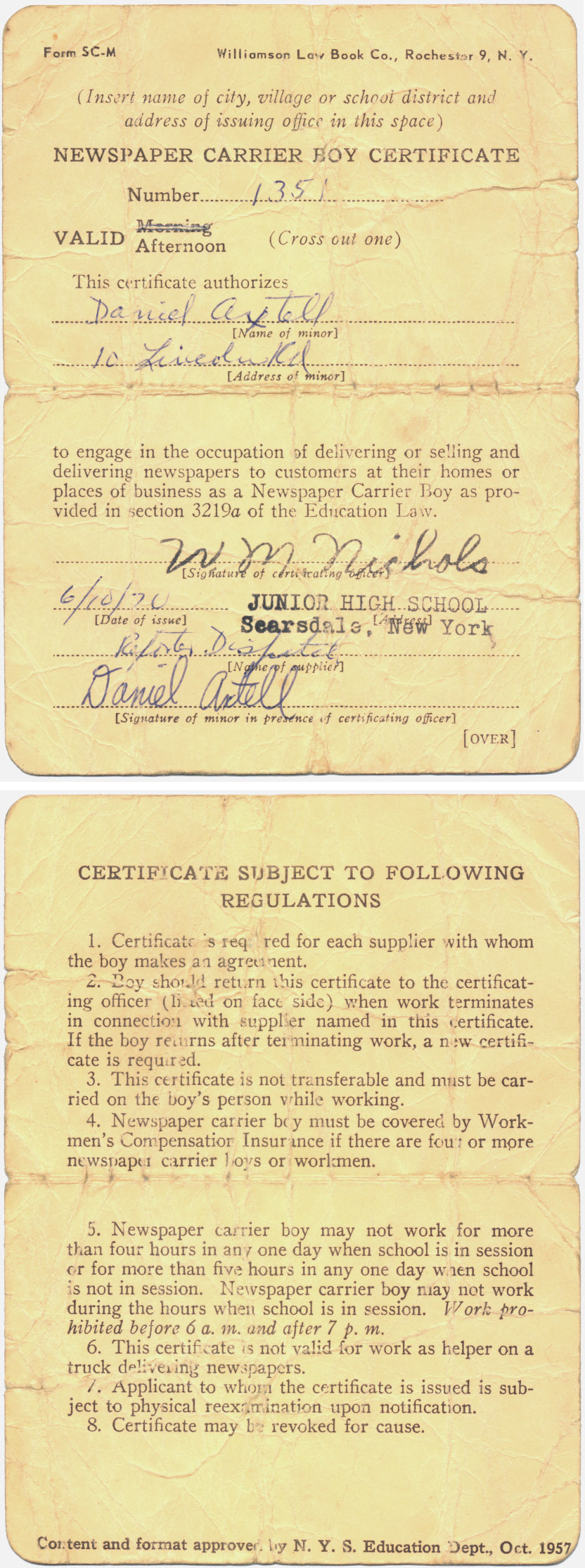
Paperboy license for boys under age 14 in 1970, when girls were not allowed to deliver newspapers in New York State

The duties of a paperboy varied by distributor, but usually included counting and separating papers, rolling papers and inserting them in newspaper bags during inclement weather, and collecting payments from customers.

The number of paperboys experienced a major decline. This is due partly to the disappearance of afternoon newspapers, whose delivery times worked better for school-aged children than did those of morning papers, which were typically delivered before 6 a.m. The numbers have also been affected by changing demographics, the availability of news and newspapers on the Internet, employment laws (particularly the mid-20th-century ban of child labour), the decline of small towns that could be traversed by bicycle, and growing concerns for the safety of unescorted children, all of which have led many newspapers to switch to delivery by adults. Today, they are mainly used by weekly community newspapers and free shopper papers, which still tend to be delivered in the afternoons. Alternatively, sometimes paperboys are only employed once a week to deliver the paper on Sunday. Many deliveries these days are by adults in cars, known as newspaper carriers. They have traditionally been hired by the newspapers as independent contractors.

== See also ==
- Bicycle messenger
- Child labour
- Newsagent's shop
- Newspaper Carrier Day
- Paperboys (documentary)
- Newspaper delivery bag
