= American Business Women's Day =

US annual national holiday on September 22

- Date: September 22
- Next time: September 22, 2026
- Frequency: annual

American Business Women's Day is an American holiday, nationally recognized on September 22.

September 22 marks the 1949 founding date of the American Business Women's Association, the mission of which is "to bring together businesswomen of diverse occupations and to provide opportunities for them to help themselves and others grow personally and professionally through leadership; education, networking support and national recognition".

This holiday was recognized in 1983 and 1986 by Congressional resolution and a proclamation issued by President Ronald Reagan. It commemorates the important legacy and contributions of the more than 68 million American working women and 7.7 million women business owners.

Moreover, it provides an opportunity for ABWA chapters and individual businesswomen to celebrate their accomplishments within the American and global marketplace.

== See also ==
- American Business Women's Association
