= Newspaper delivery bag =

Satchel used to carry newspapers

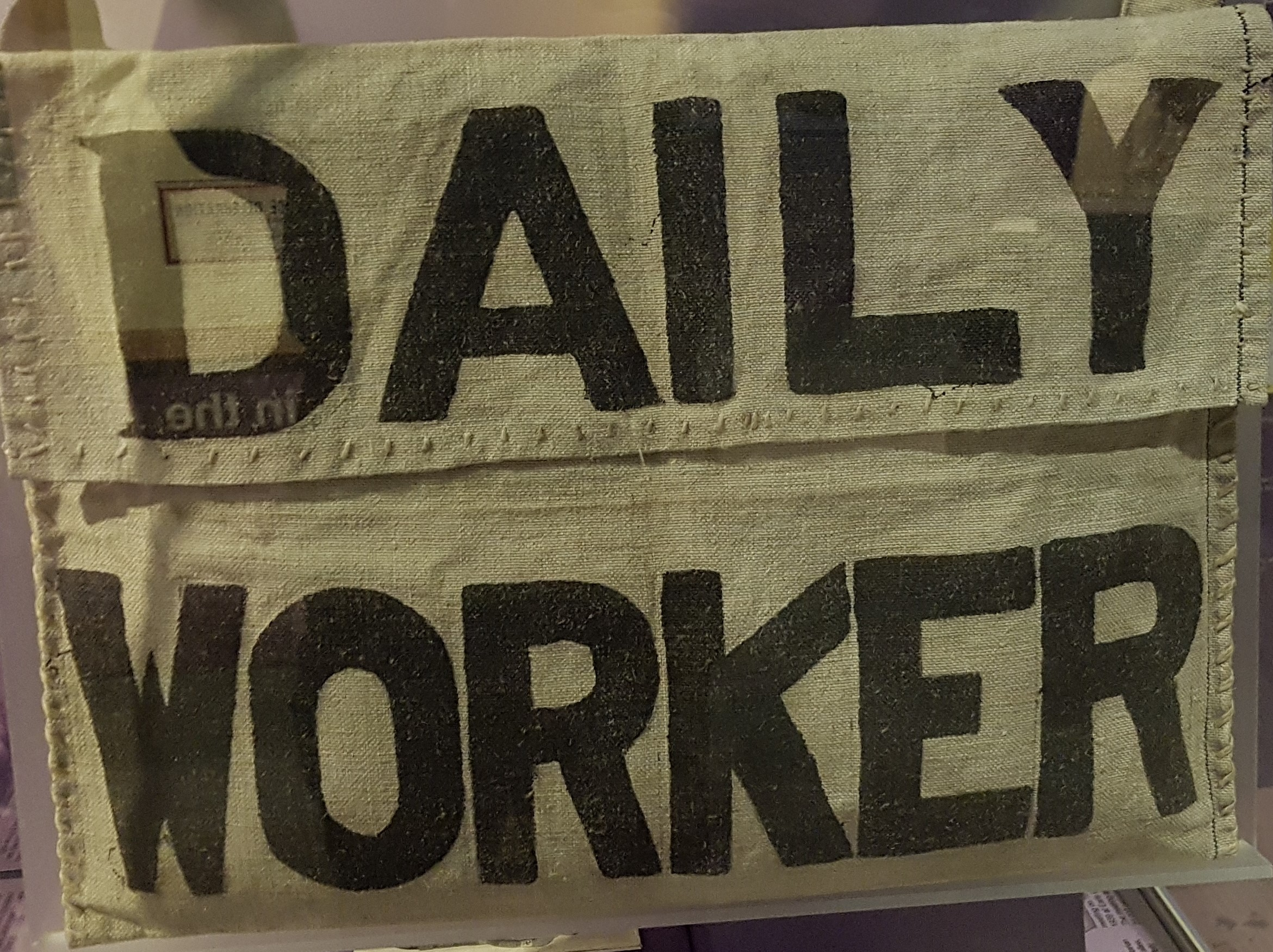
A newspaper delivery bag

A newspaper delivery bag is a satchel used by a paperboy to carry newspapers out for delivery. These bags were often made of canvas.
