= Ask a Stupid Question Day =

Informal holiday celebrated by schools

- A reference desk being asked how to ask a question in 2004.
- Observed by: United States, Britain, and India; people worldwide
- Date: September 28 or last school day of September
- Frequency: annual
- Started by: David Larzelere

Ask a Stupid Question Day (established in 1982) is a holiday celebrated in the United States, Britain, and India.

Established by librarians and commonly observed by students, its purpose is to "encourage curious people to overcome their timidity and ask that 'stupid' question".

Ask a Stupid Question Day is meant to be observed on the last school day in September, although its default date is September 28.

== History ==
=== Founding ===
In 1982, the holiday was created by librarian David Larzelere (1950—2021) of the The Flint Journal. He submitted his idea to former Journal librarian Bill Chase, establishing the holiday on September 30.

The 1986 Library News reported upon its 4th birthday and described the holiday's foundation.

The 1986 Iowa Department of Employment Services Digest mentioned the event multiple times and defined it as a day to "[break] out of thinking by the ruler, take a critical look at accepted wisdom, and pose at least one 'idiotic' query". It advised readers to "[remember] that stupid questions and curiosity often open up whole new ways of seeing and doing things". It placed the date at September 30, 1987 and September 10, 1988.

=== Rising popularity ===
In 1988, it was included in NASA's Aerospace Education Services Project calendar, listed on the last school day in September 1988, which was Friday September 30.

The 1988 Chase's Annual Events listed Friday September 30 as Ask a "Stupid" Question Day. The listing encouraged readers to call local libraries, radio stations, universities, and other institutions asking these questions.

Likely circa 1988, teachers used the holiday to encourage students to ask more questions in the classroom. According to HolidayInsights.com, "At the time, there was a movement by teachers to try to get kids to ask more questions in the classroom. Kids sometimes hold back, fearing their question is stupid, and asking it will result in ridicule. and kids will make fun of them."

In 2009, The Daily Telegraph reported that the day was being celebrated in Britain. In 2013, it was reported upon in India newspaper The Hindu.

== See also ==
- No such thing as a stupid question
