= No such thing as a stupid question =

Aphorism

"(There's) no such thing as a stupid question" is a common phrase. It implies that the quest for knowledge includes failure, and that just because one person may know less than others, they should not be afraid to ask rather than pretend they already know. In many cases, multiple people may not know, but are too afraid to ask the "stupid question"; the one who asks the question may in fact be doing a service to those around them.

== Origins ==
=== "There are no stupid questions" ===
Carl Sagan, in his work The Demon-Haunted World: Science as a Candle in the Dark, said: "There are naïve questions, tedious questions, ill-phrased questions, questions put after inadequate self-criticism. But every question is a cry to understand the world. There is no such thing as a dumb question".

A 1970 Dear Abby column in The Milwaukee Sentinel said: "There is no such thing as a stupid question if it's sincere. Better to ask and risk appearing stupid than to continue on your ignorant way and make a stupid mistake.

"There is no such thing as a stupid question, only stupid answers". Presentation Skills That Will Take You to the Top says that within the business world, the adage holds true. The book adds "a question might be uninformed, tangential, or seemingly irrelevant, but, whether the presenter perceives it to be stupid or not, every audience member has every right to ask any sort of question".

In the Line of Fire: How to Handle Tough Questions – When It Counts suggests that there are no stupid questions, rather there are "tangential questions", and that these should be dealt with swiftly and effectively.

Designing Field Studies for Biodiversity Conservation says "there's no such thing as a stupid question, as long as it ends in a question mark".

A variation of the phrase is once used by South Park's Mr. Garrison: "Remember, there are no stupid questions, just stupid people."

=== "There are stupid questions" ===
The article Ink Out Loud: There's no such thing as a stupid question,' and other ailments lavender cures defines stupid questions as:

- Questions asked by someone who already knows the answer but is trolling the person they are asking.
- Questions of which the answer should be painfully obvious to any person with a pulse who has lived on this Earth for more than a decade.
- Questions that can be answered on one's own with complete certainty. After all, information found online or from other sources can be wrong, so it never hurts to check.
- Questions that include ridiculous or hypothetical assumptions.
- Those questions that have already been answered, but the asker was not listening or paying attention.

Questions cited as stupid that were asked by the media pool at the 2000 Super Bowl are "Ray Lewis? Yeah, Ray, how long have you been surrounded by thugs?", "If you were a tree, what kind of tree would you be?", and "Can you name the Backstreet Boys?"

Breaking into the Game Industry argues that the adage (and the related one "the only stupid question is the one that is never asked") is only relevant for the classroom and that in the real world when you want to try to impress someone, there are many stupid questions one can ask.

School House Diary: Reflections of a Retired Educator notes that teachers are fond of saying this phrase, and suggests that while they themselves want to call out the stupid questions, they fall back on the adage in order to prevent the child from being ridiculed.

== See also ==
- Ask a Stupid Question Day
