= Aerospace Education Services Project =

NASA education project to promote STEM among students

Aerospace Education Services Project (AESP) is a NASA education project which delivers science, technology, engineering, and mathematics (STEM) professional development to K-12, pre-service, and informal educators providing classroom demonstrations, distance learning events, in-service training for educators and pre-service training for college students. Through utilization of NASA products and materials, AESP helps students understand how STEM content is relevant to them by using real-world and engaging materials in their classroom and encourages them to pursue a career in NASA or other STEM careers. The project has education specialists working at all of the NASA centers across the U.S. These educators work with schools and other organizations in order to deliver professional learning opportunities through both face-to-face and virtual venues. The project is managed by Kyle Peck, Principal Investigator, Peggy Maher, Director and Dan Cherry, NASA Project Manager at the Langley Research Center.

== Programs ==
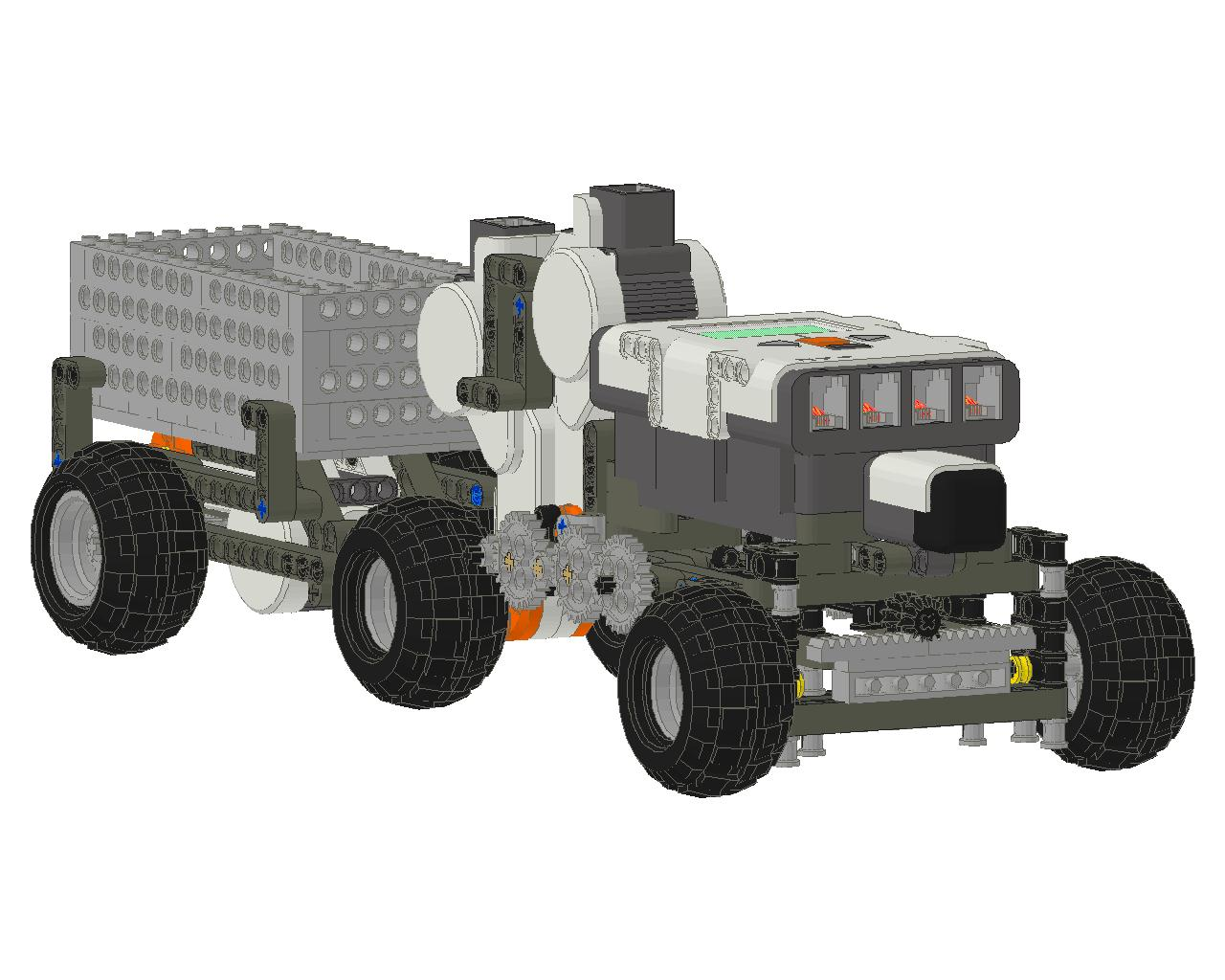
Material Transporter Robot

Robots on the Road (ROTR) is an educational program run by traveling NASA specialists in middle schools across the country. Students in grades 5-8 work in groups in order to determine what their robot is designed to do, and how it uses its motors and sensors to achieve those goals. The robots used in this program are made from Lego Mindstorms kits, and are analogous to existing NASA robots.
