= American Business Women's Association =

The American Business Women's Association is a national professional association for women, established by Kansas City businessman, Hilary Bufton Jr.

On Sept. 22, 1949, Mr. Bufton and three Kansas City businesswomen incorporated the American Business Women's Association.

“It was my feeling all women were seeking and deserved equal business opportunities.” He later wrote: “They had gained tremendous business knowledge during World War II, through necessity, and I felt a new organization for all businesswomen was needed.”

== About ABWA ==
The mission of ABWA is “to bring together businesswomen of diverse occupations and to provide opportunities for them to help themselves and others grow personally and professionally through leadership, education, networking support, and national recognition.”

Unlike profession-specific associations, ABWA is a professional organization for women in all stages of their career and in all professions. Members include everyone from teachers and administrative assistants to CEOs and small-business owners.

Membership data includes:

- 15,000 members nationwide
- 400 chapters
- Located in all 50 states
- 4,000 members are business owners
- 39% of members are Executives, Managers, Professionals and Business Owners
- 36% are Administrative, Clerical and Technical Support
- 10% are retired businesswomen
- Over 97% of members have graduated from high school
- Over 34% of members have attended college
- Over 29% have earned college degrees
- Over 10% have earned master's or doctoral degrees
- 64% live in major metropolitan area
- 36% live in a town (less than 50,000) or rural area

The American Business Women's Association represents a range of 23 different industries, including:

- Service
- Healthcare
- Education
- Retail
- Wholesale
- Banking
- Insurance
- Government
- Armed Forces
- Real Estate
- Finance
- Manufacturing
- Utility
- Publishing
- Advertising
- Broadcasting
- Transportation
- Construction
- Mining
- Recreation
- Entertainment
- Agriculture
- Forestry

== Education and Professional Development ==
This is a central focus for the Association. There are three main concentrations for professional development, including:

=== Regional and National Conferences ===
ABWA offers three regional conferences in the spring, and the National Women's Leadership Conference, in the fall. ABWA conferences feature professional speakers and educators from many industries. Seminars and workshops feature topics relevant to today's working women.

=== ABWA-KU MBA Essentials ===
The ABWA-KU MBA Essentials program is a product of a partnership between the University of Kansas School of Business and ABWA. Each MBA Essentials course delivers business subjects at a master's degree level including “Accounting Tools for Financial Success,” “Organizational Behavior and Management Principles” and “Human Resources: Principles and Practices.” This program is only offered at the ABWA annual meeting, the National Women's Leadership Conference.

=== Women as 21st Century Leaders ===
The Women as 21st Century Leaders is a product of a partnership between Park University and ABWA. Each course delivers business subjects including "Challenges and Opportunities for Women as Leaders," "Beginning with the Inner You" and "Leading through Enhanced Communication Skills." This program is only offered at the ABWA annual meeting, the National Women's Leadership Conference.

=== Women's Instructional Network ===
ABWA is the first women's association to offer an online learning portal with interactive management modules that will teach members new skills they can immediately apply as ABWA team leaders and use in the workplace. Launched in April 2009 as part of the ABWA Web site, online training courses offered include "Resumes That Get Interviews," " Interviews That Get Offers," "Managing Team Conflict" and "Making Group Decisions."

== National Recognition ==
National recognition is one of the four tenets of the association's mission. Members have the opportunity to run for national office for a seat on the organization's National Board of Directors.

Members also compete for the Top 10 Business Women of ABWA based on personal and professional achievements. Every year, ABWA groups nominate one accomplished member as a candidate for the Top Ten Business Women of ABWA.

From the ten finalists, the American Business Woman of ABWA is chosen. The Top Ten are introduced at the Association's annual meeting, the National Women's Leadership Conference.

== National Publications ==
ABWA offers a varied collection of informational tools to their members. Women in Business, the award-winning national magazine of ABWA, offers articles on a blend of personal and professional development topics. Published three times a year, Women in Business features a continuing education department focused on business and market-relevant topics.

Members also enjoy custom-designed online newsletters to serve the individual needs of different groups: Express Network for busy professionals, and a District Newsletter to keep members informed of news from the district level.
