= National Fruits & Veggies Month =

US observance in September for public health

- Genre: Public Health Campaign
- Date: September
- Frequency: Annual
- Location: United States
- Country: United States
- Years active: 2019–present
- Inaugurated: 2019
- Founder: Produce for Better Health Foundation
- Most recent: 2025
- Major events: Educate about the health benefits of eating fruits and vegetables and celebrate in song and culture how they are grown, distributed, and consumed
- Patron: No formal patron
- Sponsor: Produce for Better Health Foundation
- Website: https://fruitsandveggies.org

National Fruits & Veggies Month is a national observance and awareness campaign held in the United States during September to educate about the health benefits of eating fruits and vegetables and to celebrate in song and culture how they are grown, distributed, and consumed. The awareness campaign consists of outreach to grocery stores and retailers, schools, and public organizations; outreach to nutritionists and other health professionals; weekly online contests with prizes; social media campaigns and logo wear; and other special events during September to celebrate National Fruits & Veggies Month. They also aim to inspire people to consume fruits and vegetables regularly and to create a more balanced lifestyle. The 'Take the Have a Plant pledge' is to "add one more fruit or vegetable to your routine, every day this month." The year-long initiative centered around 'Have a Plant' involves monthly educational themes to be carried out by their Fruit and Vegetable Ambassadors in Action (FVAA) network.

The event is sponsored by the Produce for Better Health Foundation (PBH) as part of the PBH Have a Plant Movement, which "aims to transform the way Millennials and Gen Z approach fruits and vegetables to change behaviors and boost consumption" (according to its website). The PBH Have a Plant consumer movement replaces their previous Fruits & Veggies: More Matters public education program. The 2019 NFVM theme was "Have a Plant: Food Rooted in A Better Mood" and is supported with printed and downloadable literature. Since 2022, the byline theme for the event has been "Every Time You Eat, Have A Plant®."

National Nutrition Month, established in 1973 and sponsored by the Academy of Nutrition and Dietetics, follows six months later in March of each year.

== Annual NFVM themes ==
- 2019: Have A Plant – Food Rooted In A Better Mood
- 2020 - Have A Plant Nation
- 2021 - Celebrating The Roots Of Our Food
- 2022 - Every Time You Eat, Have A Plant®
- 2023 - Every Time You Eat, Have A Plant®
- 2024 - Every Time You Eat, Have A Plant®
- 2025 - Every Time You Eat, Have A Plant®
- 2026 - Have A Plant® Nation

== Media coverage ==
The PBH-CDC coalition began around 2010 with the National Cancer Institute. National Fruits & Veggies Month is recognized by public health authorities and produce distribution companies. The USDA's WIC Works Resource System designates September as *National Fruits and Veggies Month*, encouraging WIC staff to promote nutrition education and support participants in maximizing fruit and vegetable consumption during that month. This USDA site explicitly designates September as “National Fruits & Veggies Month” and encourages WIC staff to promote produce consumption during that time:

“September is National Fruits & Veggies Month, an opportunity to bring greater attention to the health benefits of eating fruits and vegetables. WIC staff can use these resources to help participants maximize their cash-value voucher and remind them that it's not too late to take advantage of summer produce!”

== See also ==
- Global Burden of Disease
- Plant-based diet
