= White Balloon Day =

Awareness day for survivors of child sexual abuse

Bravehearts Day (formerly known as White Balloon Day) is a day dedicated to support for survivors of child sexual abuse, created by the non-profit organization Bravehearts. Bravehearts day is held annually during National Child Protection Week (4-10 September) in Australia. Its aim is to raise awareness of child sexual assault within the community.

== History ==
It first began after a march in Belgium in October 1996, when 300,000 people gathered with white balloons to show public sympathy and support for the parents of girls who were sexually assaulted by Marc Dutroux, a previously convicted and then released paedophile. The march facilitated the creation of a parliamentary commission to look into the shortcomings of the investigation into the Dutroux case.

As of 2022, Bravehearts raised through White Balloon Day have been allocated to teach over 1.5 million children across Australia about personal safety, as well as helped to fund counselling and support services for children and families impacted by child sexual abuse.
