= Treaty of Paris (1808) =

1808 treaty between France and Prussia

The Treaty of Paris was an agreement signed on 8 September 1808 in Paris between the First French Empire and the Kingdom of Prussia. Also known as the Convention of Paris, it set the terms of a withdrawal of French occupying troops, including an indemnity of 140 million francs and an upper limit on the size of the Prussian Army of 42,000 a figure insisted on by the French emperor Napoleon.

Prussia had been decisively defeated in the War of the Fourth Coalition and its capital Berlin had been occupied by Napoleon. The war was ended by the Treaty of Tilsit in July 1807, with Prussia forced to surrender large significant territory. French garrisons remained scattered across Prussia after Tilsit.

Prussian power was significantly weakened and the agreement in Paris the following year further confirmed this. Article 28 at Tilsit had left discussion of the Prussian military to a future agreement. The Treaty cemented Napoleon's hegemony of Continental Europe. In addition to the military limit, Prussia was also forced to pay an indemnity of 140 million francs, although this figure was reduced thanks to the intervention of Alexander I of Russia at the Congress of Erfurt in October 1808.

In 1812 an auxiliary corps of Prussian troops took part in Napoleon's disastrous invasion of Russia. In March 1813 Prussia declared war on France, revoking the Treaty and rapidly expanded its army to play a major role in the victorious Sixth Coalition that defeated Napoleon.

== Bibliography ==
- Broers, Michael, Hicks, Peter & Guimera, Agustin. The Napoleonic Empire and the New European Political Culture. Palgrave Macmillan, 2012.
- Phillipson, Coleman. Termination of War and Treaties of Peace. Lawbook Exchange, 2008.
- Shanahan, William Oswald. Prussian Military Reforms 1786-1813. AMS Press, 1996.
