= Emergency Services Day (United Kingdom) =

Annual event, 9 September

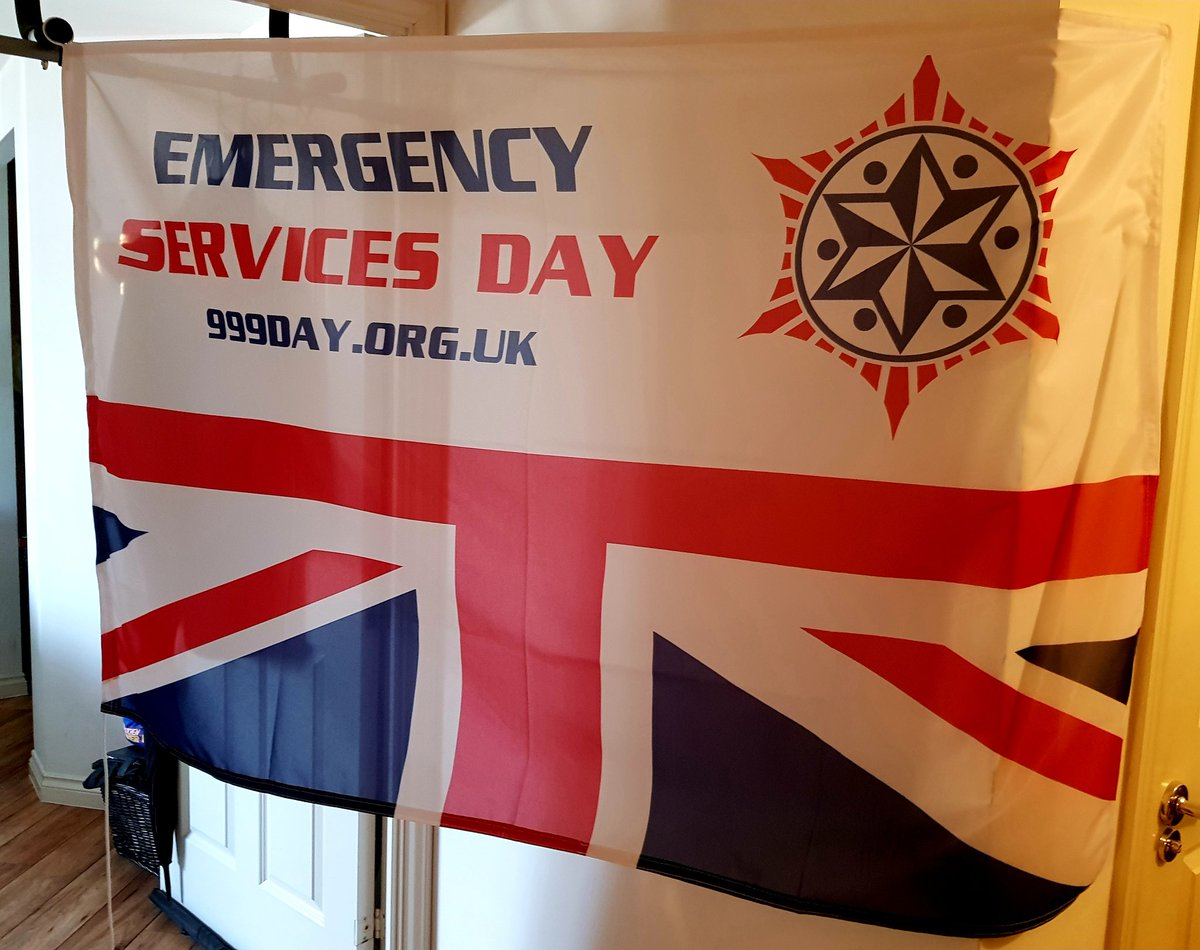
- 999 Day Flag
- Official name: Emergency Services Day
- Observed by: United Kingdom
- Significance: Celebration of the contributions, both past and present, of those who have served in the Emergency Services of the United Kingdom
- Observances: Open day events, parades, silences, celebrations, thanksgiving
- Date: 9 September
- Next time: 9 September 2027
- Frequency: annual

Emergency Services Day (also known as 999 Day) in the United Kingdom is an annual event on 9 September each year to promote efficiency in the UK Emergency Services and National Health Service, to educate the public about using the emergency services responsibly, and to promote the many career and volunteering opportunities across the emergency services in positions such as Special Constables and NHS Community Responders. Open day events are held on the nearest Sunday to 999 Day, with one main national open day rotating across the UK 999 Day starts at 9am to represent the 9th hour of the 9th day of the 9th month.

== History ==
Emergency Services Day was founded by Tom Scholes-Fogg in 2016 and launched in September 2017, with the inaugural 999 Day taking place in September 2018. 999 Day was designated as an official day in 2017 by then UK Prime Minister Theresa May.

== Royal and political support ==
Emergency Services Day was supported since its creation by Queen Elizabeth II and has continued to be supported by Their Majesties King Charles III and Queen Camilla; and His Royal Highness The Prince of Wales.

999 Day is also supported by Prime Minister, Sir Keir Starmer, the First Minister of Scotland, First Minister of Wales, and the First Minister and Deputy First Minister of Northern Ireland.

== Commemoration ==
Since records began, over 7,500 members of the emergency services have lost their lives in the line of duty, and many more have lost their lives as a result of their service such as driving to and from work, or from illness. A national two-minutes' silence takes place at 9am on 9th September to remember those who lost their lives.

== See also ==
- List of British police officers killed in the line of duty
- List of British firefighters killed in the line of duty
