= Celebrate Freedom Week =

Official holiday in five U.S. states

Celebrate Freedom Week is an official holiday celebrated by five U.S. states. Celebrate Freedom Week is a week designed to emphasize the teaching of the country's origins with an emphasis on the founding documents. The curriculum is taught to children of various age groups, dependent on which state it's being taught in, from kindergarten through the 12th grade. As of September 2013, the five states that officially celebrate this holiday are Arkansas, Florida, Kansas, Oklahoma and Texas. Even though several states have made this an official holiday, there isn't a set week among the states when to celebrate it or how. Kansas and Texas both celebrate the week containing September 17, the date the U.S. Constitution was signed. Oklahoma celebrates the holiday the week containing November 11, Veterans Day, while Florida and Arkansas celebrate it the last full week of September.

Kansas passed the law to make it an official holiday week and became effective on July 1, 2013. Arkansas passed House Bill 2756 and made it official as Act 682 on March 26, 2003. Florida made it law in 2002 (statute 1003.421). Texas made the law effective in 2001 and then modified the law December 7, 2003.
