= 1819 Balloon riot =

Collective outburst relating to Balloonomania

The Philadelphia Balloon Riot occurred at Vauxhall Garden in Philadelphia, Pennsylvania on the evening of September 8, 1819. After guards beat a boy unconscious for attempting to climb a fence separating the paying guests from those who couldn't afford the expensive entry fee, crowds broke down the fence and ripped the hot air balloon to pieces.

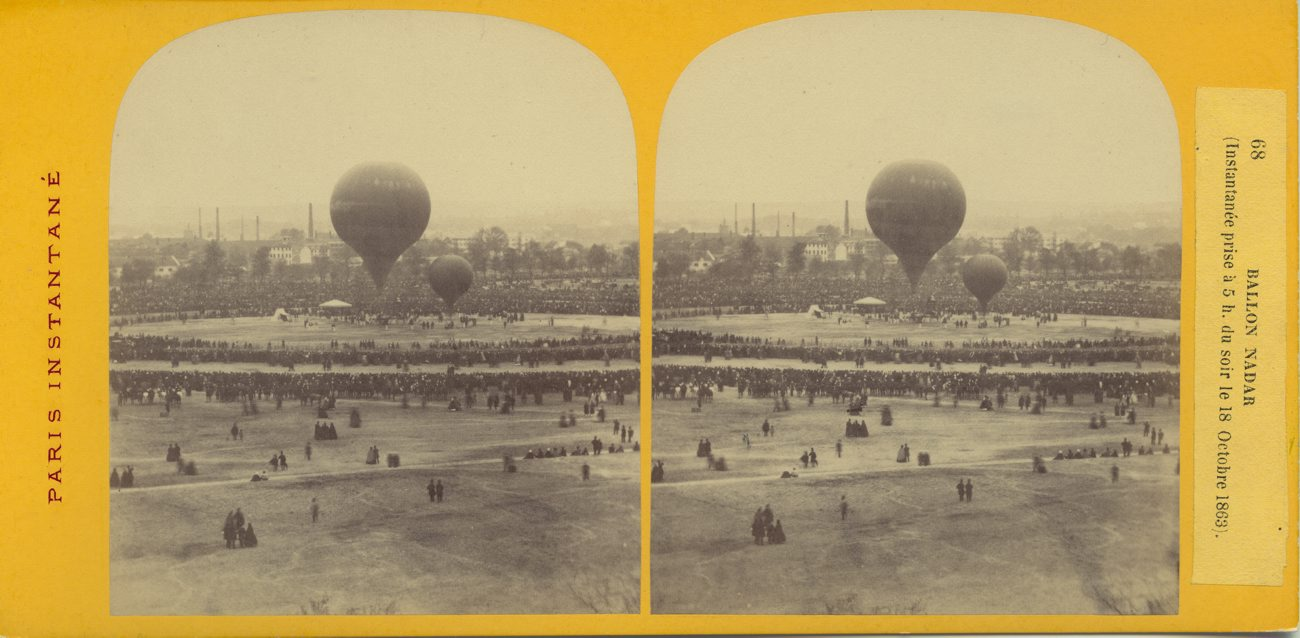
So called "balloonomania" was widespread in the 19th century.

== Background ==
In the early 1800s, Balloon aviation was a novel phenomenon in the U.S. The first manned flight in a U.S. balloon was accomplished by Edward Warren in nearby Baltimore in 1784. In September 1819 the Franklin Gazette of Philadelphia announced that French aeronaut Monsieur Michel would perform a balloon ascension and parachute leap at Vauxhall Garden. Tens of thousands arrived to witness the balloon launch, but the one dollar admission fee (equal to $24.77 in 2024) prevented all but the wealthy from taking a closer look at the balloon.

Given the nature of hot air balloon technology at the time, the success or failure of a given balloon flight was uncertain and thus created significant suspense. Due to "insufficient gas," the balloon at Vauxhall Gardens did not inflate properly and did not rise which further annoyed the waiting crowd. Frustrated onlookers threw stones and punctured the balloon, whilst others attempted to climb the fence blocking the view. One of these, a boy of fourteen, attempted to climb the fence and was quickly attacked by security guards. The sight of the boy, beaten unconscious, aroused the anger of the crowd.

== Causes ==
The exact causes of the Philadelphia Balloon Riot are uncertain. Paul Gilje considers the Philadelphia Balloon Riot to be an example of class conscious rioting, mainly caused by the visible divisions between those who could pay for better access to the balloon and those who could not. Other scholars suggest that the overreaction of local authorities was an important factor in the riot, stressing the beating of the boy as the primary cause. Still others ascribe the riot to a "dark side of popular enthusiasm."

== Events ==
Upon seeing the bloodied body of the boy, the crowd took action. With the flagpole from the gardens as a makeshift battering ram, the crowd destroyed the gate. They then, in a show of "egalitarian spirit," tore the balloon to pieces with "sticks and stones." Not content with ripping the balloon apart, the crowd then smashed the instruments of musicians responsible for entertaining the paying guests, destroyed the refreshment bar, and eventually set fire to the pavilion.

== See also ==
- Balloonomania
