= Newspaper Carrier Day =

International Newspaper Carrier Day
- Date: October 7
- Next time: 7 October 2026
- Frequency: annual

International Newspaper Carrier Day is an annual observance created by the Newspaper Association of America and celebrated in October. The day is scheduled in association with the Newspaper Association Managers' National Newspaper Week. National Newspaper Week is celebrated during the first full week in October (Sun-Sat), and Newspaper Carrier Day is observed on the Saturday of that week. News Media Canada (the national association representing the newspaper industry in Canada) also observes this particular date, noting newspapers may choose to observe the day by running an ad, or organizing special events or activities. The purpose of National Newspaper Week and Newspaper Carrier Day is to highlight the contributions that newspapers, their staff and carriers make to gather and deliver the news to their communities.

There is also a Newspaper Carrier Day, origin unknown, on September 4 annually. It "honors Barney Flaherty, the first newspaper carrier (or paperboy) hired in 1833, as well as all current newspaper carriers." It is celebrated on September 4, the anniversary of Flaherty's hiring by Benjamin Day, publisher of the New York Sun. It is also observed by The Armidale Express, NSW, Australia.

== See also ==
- Paperboy
