= National Good Neighbor Day =

September 28 in the United States

National Good Neighbor Day is a national day in the United States observed each year on September 28. It is often associated with President Jimmy Carter, who proclaimed September 24 as National Good Neighbor Day in 1978. Local activities on the day are intended to build a sense of community, and typically include neighborhood events and promoting acts of kindness. The day is intended to overcome the isolation of many Americans, who often don't know very much about their neighbors.

== History ==
Becky Mattson of Lakeside, Montana, came up with the idea for a Good Neighbor Day in the early 1970s. While she gave many reasons for the initiative, Mattson once told her local newspaper that the trigger was her own elderly mother complaining that no one called her during the day while Mattson was at work as a real estate agent. A United States Senate resolution on National Good Neighbor Day stated that Mattson had observed that technology such as television and the telephone had improved communication around the world, but had made it less likely that people would build relationships with their neighbors next door. Concerns over crime, single-parent families, and other "social ills" were also motivating factors for Becky and her husband Richard C. Mattson, who decided to enlist the help of Senator Mike Mansfield.

In the 1970s, three United States Presidents, including Richard Nixon, Gerald Ford, and Jimmy Carter, proclaimed the fourth Sunday of September as National Good Neighbor Day. The first president to sign a National Good Neighbor Day proclamation was Nixon in 1973. President Ford signed a proclamation in 1976. Following a change in Congressional procedures, Senator Paul G. Hatfield and Congressman Max Baucus introduced legislation in both houses of Congress, before securing the support of a majority in the United States House of Representatives. As a result, President Carter signed Proclamation 4601 establishing September 24, 1978, as National Good Neighbor Day, stating that it should be observed "with appropriate ceremonies and activities."

In 2002, Senator Max Baucus submitted a resolution in the United States Senate to make National Good Neighbor Day permanent, rather than an event that had to be approved each year. The resolution stated that the events of September 11, 2001, had "exhibited the best of the human spirit in the face of enormous tragedy" and that both Baucus and Becky Mattson believed that making Good Neighbor Day a permanent event on the national calendar would help to "reinforce the strength of our communities and show our resolve to be united as a nation". The national day was again proposed for the fourth Sunday each September.

National Good Neighbor Day is now observed on September 28. A Senate resolution in 2008 also recognized two other similar initiatives that had originated in Rhode Island: National Neighbor Day, celebrated on the Sunday before Memorial Day weekend, which started in 1993 in Westerly; and National Neighborhood Day, celebrated on the third Sunday of September, which started in Providence.

== Activities ==
Individuals, organizations, and communities observe undertake a wide range of activities to observe National Good Neighbor Day. Many organize social events such as block parties and picnics; distribute food, flowers, first aid kits, and other essentials; and perform tasks for neighbors such as painting, weeding, and taking out the rubbish. Some choose specifically to focus on elderly neighbors; neighbors who are unwell or unable to leave their homes; new neighbors who need to be welcomed into the community; or children.

=== Schools ===
National Good Neighbor Day gained popularity in national student and teacher magazines, as well as a Sesame Street-themed publication in the 1970s, and continues to be promoted in publications such as Highlights for Children.

In 1976, senior citizens in Fayette County, Ohio, were invited by the Board of Education to visit a local elementary school to tour the school grounds, learn about the curriculum, and interact with young pupils. In the early 2000s, Leadership for Student Activities suggested that students could express thanks to their school's neighbors for putting up with traffic and other inconveniences by sending a note and doing something nice.

=== State and local governments ===
National Good Neighbor Day gained support among several state leaders, such as Governor Jerry Brown of California in the 1970s.

The Parks and Recreations Department in Renton, Washington, hosted an all-age event as part of its 2024 Community Celebrations, with lunch, face painting, and games, and participation from first responders.
