= World Physical Therapy Day =

Annual observance day

World PT Day is observed to generate awareness about the crucial contribution physiotherapists make to society, enabling people to be mobile, well, and independent. This is observed on 8 September. Designated in 1996, World PT Day is promoted by World Physiotherapy.

== World Physiotherapy Day activities 2023 ==
World Physiotherapy Day, celebrated on 8 September, is an opportunity to raise awareness about the vital role physiotherapists play in promoting health and well-being. In 2023, numerous countries across the globe participated in this celebration, showcasing their unique ways of honouring the contributions of physiotherapists. Here is a list of countries that celebrated World Physiotherapy Day in 2023:

- Bahamas: World PT Day 2023
- Brazil: World PT Day 2023
- Canada: World PT Day 2023
- Iraq: World PT Day 2023
- Korea (Republic of): World PT Day 2023
- Kuwait: World PT Day 2023
- Lebanon: World PT Day 2023
- Macau: World PT Day 2023
- Mexico: World PT Day 2023
- Pakistan: World PT Day 2023
- Portugal: World PT Day 2023
- South Sudan: World PT Day 2023
- Sri Lanka: World PT Day 2023
- St Lucia: World PT Day 2023
- Taiwan: World PT Day 2023
- United Arab Emirates: World PT Day 2023
- United States: World PT Day 2023

The celebration in each country included various activities and events that emphasized the importance of physiotherapy in improving health and mobility. For detailed insights on how each country marked the day, refer to their respective associations and organizations.

== Themes/Focus of the Year ==
- 2025: Healthy ageing.
- 2024: Low back pain (LBP) and the role of physiotherapy in its management and prevention.
- 2023: Arthritis, with an in-depth look at some forms of inflammatory arthritis, including rheumatoid arthritis and axial spondyloarthritis.
- 2022: Osteoarthritis and the role of physiotherapists in its prevention and in the management of people affected by osteoarthritis.
- 2021: Rehabilitation and Long COVID and the role of physiotherapists in the treatment and management of people affected by Long COVID.
- 2020: Role of physiotherapy in rehabilitation and COVID-19.
- 2019: Chronic pain and the role that physiotherapy and physical activity has in its management and treatment.
- 2018: Physical therapy and mental health”, demonstrating the role that physical therapy and physical activity has in mental health.
- 2017: Physical activity for life.
- 2016: Add life to years.
