= Land of the Free (anthem) =

National anthem of Belize

- National anthem of Belize
- Lyrics: Samuel Alfred Haynes, 1929
- Music: Selwyn Walford Young, 1930
- Adopted: 1981

Audio sample
- U.S. Navy Band instrumental version: file; help

"Land of the Free" is the national anthem of Belize. The words were written by Samuel Alfred Haynes in 1929 based upon Haynes poem “Land of the Gods.” The musical arrangement for “Land of the Gods,” was composed with Selwyn Walford Young in 1930. “Land of the Gods” was changed to “Land of the Free” by the George Cadle Price administration, officially adopted as the National Anthem of Belize in 1981.

== History and criticism ==
=== Samuel Haynes ===
Upon the outbreak of the First World War, Haynes enlisted in the British West Indies Regiment. After being discharged at the end of the war, Hayne returned to Belize where he joined various workers' movements in Belize and played a vital role in a riot by ex-servicemen against racial discrimination which occurred 22 July. After the riot was suppressed by the colonial government, Haynes began organising the Belizean branch of the Universal Negro Improvement Association (UNIA) and facilitated the visit of its leader, Jamaican activist Marcus Garvey to Belize. Garvey recruited Haynes to work with him in the United States, a move that rendered the UNIA chapted in Belize leaderless for much of the 1920s and that indirectly contributed to the Isaiah Emmanuel Morter controversy. Haynes most likely wrote the anthem as an answer to colonialism's stifling of Belizeans' identity. The lofty language and uplifting lyrics referenced Belize's former status as a slave society indebted to profits from forestry, linking it to the end of Belize's colonial period, a process that culminated on 21 September 1981. The song was originally titled "Land of the Gods", a salute to the proliferation of organised religion in Belize.

=== Exalting by the PUP ===
With the arrival of the nationalist movement led by the People's United Party, the search was on for new symbols of Belizean identity. The PUP had defied the colonial order by singing "God Bless America" instead of the royal anthem "God Save the King" (or Queen). At independence, the ruling PUP named "Land of the Free" Belize's official anthem and played it at emotional independence ceremonies on 21 September. Most Belizeans agreed with the choice but lamented that it had not been put to a vote of Belizean residents.

=== Common complaints since ===
The anthem has come under fire from critics who charge that its language is archaic and does not appeal to a new generation of Belizeans who are in any case too young to remember Samuel Haynes.

Some have argued that the anthem is too male-centric. Lyrics such as "Our manhood we pledge to thy liberty" suggest the song was originally intended to be sung only by men. Amandala correspondent Naomi Burn suggested that "manhood" be replaced by "honour" so that the lyrics would have more relevance for women. It has also been noted that women are never mentioned in the anthem, only men. A 1998 survey of approximately 2,000 Belizean women asked how important it was to include women in the national anthem. 14.6% answered "most important", 19.7% answered "somewhat important", and 63.4% answered "not very important".

Nationalist writers have argued that the anthem's references to the Baymen ignore the multi-cultural diversity of Belize today and have proposed a number of replacements. The most recent complaint of this nature was leveled by Maya-Mestizo-born correspondent Clinton Luna, who suggested that the phrase "sons of the Belizean soil" should replace "sons of the Baymen's clan" in the chorus in recent issues of the Amandala weekly newspaper. The newspaper itself has previously argued to the same effect. However, Amandala contributor Henry Gordon countered in a later issue that nothing in the anthem represents any sort of bias to any ethnic group in Belize.

Belizeans speak a wide range of languages including English, Spanish, three different Mayan languages, as well as native languages spoken by its diverse Chinese-speaking people, Garinagu, East Indian population, Mennonite community. The anthem, in formal English, has been memorised by generations of children, but not necessarily understood. Because Kriol is the language that binds all Belizeans together, regardless of the origin of their first language, Leela Vernon translated the song into Kriol in 2011 with the hope that the meaning behind the words would be better understood.

== Other uses ==
- Late former Prime Minister George Price toured the nation sometime in the early 2000s to promote the singing of the national anthem. He visited schools in rural areas and led children in singing the anthem.
- National radio stations generally play a version of the national anthem at morning sign-on. Most feature a recording of Price singing the anthem at piano in a faster tempo than usual or an instrumental version.
- In author Zee Edgell's Beka Lamb, the title character and her friend Toycie Qualo sing the full version of the original song, "Land of the Gods" (of which the two opening and closing lines are mentioned in the story), while parodying the political meetings then being held by the PIP, a reference to the PUP, in Belize City. Edgell acknowledged permission to use the song at the front of the book.
- The anthem was prominently featured in demonstrations in Belize in 2005.
- Belizeans normally stand at attention facing forward, headgear off, while singing or facing someone singing the national anthem.

== Lyrics ==
Only the first verse is considered to be official and is performed at official events.

I
O, Land of the Free by the Carib Sea,
Our manhood we pledge to thy liberty!
No tyrants here linger, despots must flee
This tranquil haven of democracy
The blood of our sires which hallows the sod,
Brought freedom from slavery, oppression's rod
By the might of truth, and the grace of God,
No longer shall we be hewers of wood!

Chorus:
Arise! ye sons of the Baymen's clan,
Put on your armour, clear the land!
Drive back the tyrants, let despots flee -
Land of the Free by the Carib Sea.

II
Nature has blessed thee with wealth untold,
O'er mountains and valleys where prairies roll;
Our fathers, the Baymen, valiant and bold
Drove back the invader; this heritage hold
From proud Rio Hondo to old Sarstoon,
Through coral isle, over blue lagoon;
Keep watch with the angels, the stars and moon;
For freedom comes tomorrow's noon!

Chorus
