= 2006 in Belize =

- Decades: 1980s; 1990s; 2000s; 2010s; 2020s
- See also: Other events of 2006; Timeline of Belizean history

Events in the year 2006 in Belize.

== Incumbents ==
- Monarch: Elizabeth II
- Governor-General: Colville Young
- Prime Minister: Said Musa

== Events ==
- VPV-FM November 5 bought by PUP
- 2006 Belizean municipal elections
- Barrio_Fino_FC founded
- CDCS Costa Del Sol Nairi's founded
- The Independent (Belize) founded
- National Reform Party (Belize) founded
- National Transportation Services Limited founded January
- Pickstock Lake FC founded
- San Felipe Barcelona FC founded
- Santel's SC founded
- Super League of Belize founded
- Texmar United founded
