= 2010 in Belize =

- Decades: 1990s; 2000s; 2010s; 2020s
- See also: Other events of 2010; Timeline of Belizean history

Events in the year 2010 in Belize.

== Incumbents ==
- Monarch: Elizabeth II
- Governor-General: Colville Young
- Prime Minister: Dean Barrow

== Events ==
- Gang Suppression Unit is founded
- Belize–Guatemala Partial Scope Agreement comes into effect April 4
- Hurricane Karl
- Hurricane Richard makes landfall October 25
- Belize High School established
