= 2017 in Belize =

- Decades: 1990s; 2000s; 2010s; 2020s
- See also: Other events of 2017; Timeline of Belizean history

Events in the year 2017 in Belize.

== Incumbents ==
- Monarch: Elizabeth II
- Governor General: Colville Young
- Prime Minister: Dean Barrow

== Events ==
- San Pedro Pirates FC, a football team based in San Pedro, is established. The team competed in the 2017–18 Premier League of Belize.

== Deaths ==
- 16 February – Osmond P. Martin, Roman Catholic Bishop (b. 1930).
- 19 February – Leela Vernon, cultural person noted for her contributions to preserving Creole culture (b. 1950).
