= 2009 in Belize =

- Decades: 1980s; 1990s; 2000s; 2010s; 2020s
- See also: Other events of 2009; Timeline of Belizean history

Events in the year 2009 in Belize.

== Incumbents ==
- Monarch: Elizabeth II
- Governor-General: Colville Young
- Prime Minister: Dean Barrow

== Events ==
- Tek It or Leave It ends February 17
- Attorney General of Belize v Belize Telecom Ltd is decided March 18
- 2009 Birthday Honours announced 15 June
- 2009 Swan Islands earthquake May 28
- 2009 Belizean municipal elections
- The Kremandala Show December 9 original release ends
