= 2007 in Belize =

- Decades: 1980s; 1990s; 2000s; 2010s; 2020s
- See also: Other events of 2007; Timeline of Belizean history

Events in the year 2007 in Belize.

== Incumbents ==
- Monarch: Elizabeth II
- Governor-General: Colville Young
- Prime Minister: Said Musa

== Events ==
- People's National Party (Belize) February 19 founded
- 2007 Birthday Honours
- Hurricane Dean
- Karaoke Television ends October 7
- The Independent (Belize) ended October
- Belize Defence Force FC founded
- National Belizean Alliance formed October
- Georgetown Ibayani FC founded
