= 2008 in Belize =

- Decades: 1980s; 1990s; 2000s; 2010s; 2020s
- See also: Other events of 2008; Timeline of Belizean history

Events in the year 2008 in Belize.

== Incumbents ==
- Monarch: Elizabeth II
- Governor-General: Colville Young
- Prime Minister:
  - Said Musa leaves office February 8
  - Dean Barrow enters office February 8

== Events ==
- Valley Pride Freedom Fighters FC founded
- 2008 Birthday Honours
- 2008 Belizean constitutional referendum 7 February
- 2008 Belizean general election February 7
- Cayo North East and Belmopan (Belize House constituency) established
- The Kremandala Show and Tek It or Leave It debut
- Al-Falah Mosque (Belize) opens May 16
