= 2012 in Belize =

- Decades: 1990s; 2000s; 2010s; 2020s
- See also: Other events of 2012; Timeline of Belizean history

Events in the year 2012 in Belize.

== Incumbents ==
- Monarch: Elizabeth II
- Governor-General: Colville Young
- Prime Minister: Dean Barrow

== Events ==
- Police United FC (Belize) is founded
- Belize Green Independent Party is founded
- Diamond Jubilee of Elizabeth II
- 2012 Belizean general election
- 2012 Belizean municipal elections
