= Heinemann Caribbean Writers Series =

Series of books published by Heinemann

- Parent company: Heinemann
- Founded: 1970; 56 years ago
- Country of origin: United Kingdom

The Heinemann Caribbean Writers Series (CWS) is a collection of books written by Caribbean novelists and poets. According to the academic Anthony van der Vlies:

The series was modelled on the 'Heinemann African Writers Series', launched in 1970 by James Currey and others at Heinemann Educational Books (HEB) to republish work by major Caribbean writers, including Earl Lovelace, V. S. Naipaul, Derek Walcott, and Michael Anthony (whose The Year was the first title). HEB Ltd Caribbean, established in Jamaica in 1976 under Ian Randle, had an important influence on the series, which merged briefly with the 'African Writers Series' in the 1980s.

== Bibliography ==
Author	Title	First published	Genre
Opal Palmer Adisa	It Begins with Tears	1997	Novel.
Michael Anthony	Green Days by the River	1967	Novel.
Michael Anthony	The Year in San Fernando	1965	Novel.
Michael Anthony	Cricket in the Road	1973	Novel.
Frank Collymore	The Man Who Loved Attending Funerals and Other Stories	1993	Short story collection.
Maryse Condé	Season in Rhiata	1998	Novel.
Christine Craig	Mint Tea and Other Stories	1993	Short story collection.
Gwyneth Harold Davidson	Bad Girls in School	2007	Novel.
Zee Edgell	Beka Lamb	1982	Novel.
Zee Edgell	The Festival of San Joaquin	1997	Novel.
Zee Edgell	Time and the River	2007	Novel.
Curdella Forbes	Songs of Silence	2002	Novel.
David Franklyn	Children of the Sea	2009	Novel.
Beryl Gilroy	Frangipani House	1986	Novel.
Merle Hodge	Crick Crack, Monkey	1970	Novel.
Nailah Folami Imoja	Pick of the Crop	2004	Novella.
Evan Jones	Stone Haven	1998	Novel, abridged. Unabridged version published by Institute of Jamaica Publications in 1993.
Paulette Ramsay	Aunt Jen	1970	Novel.
V. S. Reid	The Leopard	1958	Novel.
V. S. Reid	New Day	1949	Novel.
Maria Roberts-Squires	October All Over	2005	Novel.
Jacques Roumain	Masters of the Dew	1944	Novel.
Earl Lovelace	The Schoolmaster	1968	Novel.
Earl Lovelace	The Wine of Astonishment	1982	Novel.
Ian McDonald	The Humming-Bird Tree	1969	Novel.
Clement Maharaj	The Dispossessed	1992	Novel.
Edgar Mittelholzer	Corentyne Thunder	1941	Novel.
V. S. Naipaul	Miguel Street	1959	Novel.
M. NourbeSe Philip	Harriet's Daughter	1988	Novel.
Vanessa Spence	The Roads Are Down	1993	Novel.
Vanessa Spence	Witchbroom	1992	Novel.
Lewis Henry	The Gaulin and the Dove	2008	Novel.
Multiple	The Heinemann Book of Caribbean Poetry	1992	Poetry anthology, edited by Ian McDonald.
