= 2003 in Belize =

- Decades: 1980s; 1990s; 2000s; 2010s; 2020s
- See also: Other events of 2003; Timeline of Belizean history

Events in the year 2003 in Belize.

== Incumbents ==
- Monarch: Elizabeth II
- Governor-General: Colville Young
- Prime Minister: Said Musa

== Events ==
- 2003 Belizean general election
- 2003 Belizean municipal elections
- Speednet formed
- Tour of Belize February
- We the People Reform Movement
