= 2016 in Belize =

- Decades: 1990s; 2000s; 2010s; 2020s
- See also: Other events of 2016; Timeline of Belizean history

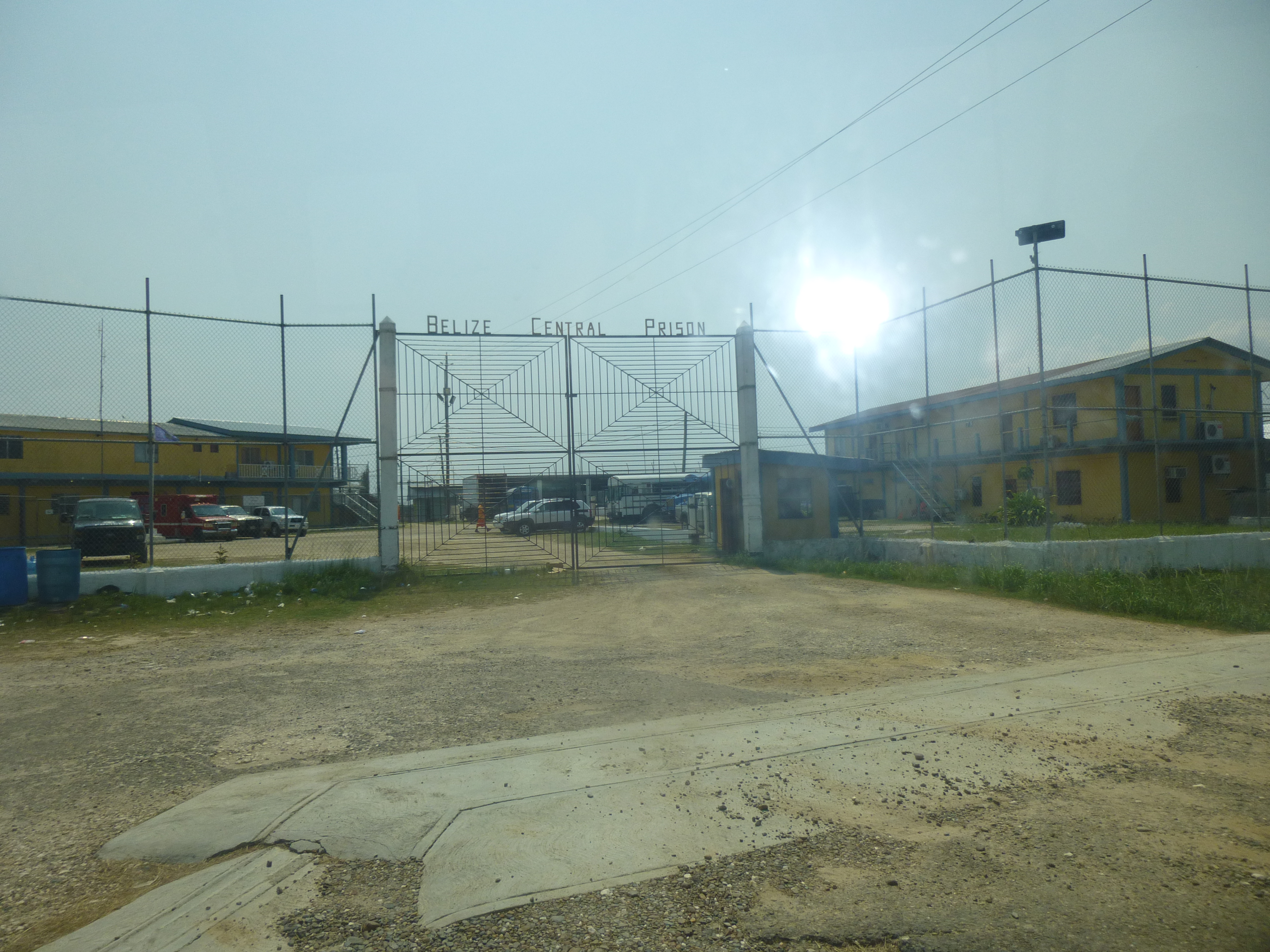
Front gate of Belize Central Prison

Events in the year 2016 in Belize.

== Incumbents ==
- Monarch: Elizabeth II
- Governor-General: Colville Young
- Prime Minister: Dean Barrow

== Events ==
Hurricane Earl (2016) Strikes Belize as a category 1.

2016 Belize–Guatemala border standoff - Belizean soldiers shoot a 13 year old Guatemalan child.
