= 2015 in Belize =

- Decades: 1990s; 2000s; 2010s; 2020s
- See also: Other events of 2015; Timeline of Belizean history

Events in the year 2015 in Belize.

== Incumbents ==
- Monarch: Elizabeth II
- Governor General: Colville Young
- Prime Minister: Dean Barrow

== Events ==
- 2015 Belizean general election
- 2015 Belizean municipal elections
