= 2011 in Belize =

- Decades: 1990s; 2000s; 2010s; 2020s
- See also: Other events of 2011; Timeline of Belizean history

Events in the year 2011 in Belize.

== Incumbents ==
- Monarch: Elizabeth II
- Governor-General: Colville Young
- Prime Minister: Dean Barrow

== Events ==
- Super League of Belize disbands
- San Ignacio United FC is founded in August
