= 2005 in Belize =

- Decades: 1980s; 1990s; 2000s; 2010s; 2020s
- See also: Other events of 2005; Timeline of Belizean history

Events in the year 2005 in Belize.

== Incumbents ==
- Monarch: Elizabeth II
- Governor-General: Colville Young
- Prime Minister: Said Musa

== Events ==
- Vision Inspired by the People established December
- 2005 Belize unrest January and April
- Noh Matta Wat! November 28 original release
- Belize Coast Guard November 28 formed
- FC Belize established
- Revolutionary Conquerors FC established
