= Paul Edwards (literary scholar) =

Paul Geoffrey Edwards (31 July 1926 – 10 May 1992) was a British literary scholar who was Professor of English and African Literature at the University of Edinburgh.

Known for his "adventurous and unorthodox teaching" as a lecturer in black history and African-American literature, Edwards played a significant role in establishing Olaudah Equiano as a "key figure in African and black literature in general." He also wrote on Romanticism, and collaborated with Hermann Pálsson in translations of the Icelandic sagas and other books on the literature of medieval Iceland.

== Early life and education ==
From Birmingham, Edwards studied English at Durham University and then Celtic and Icelandic at the University of Cambridge. He was Editor of Palatinate during his time at Durham, working alongside Harold Evans.

== Career ==
Edwards worked in West Africa for nine years following university, teaching literature to students in Ghana and Sierra Leone. The demand of his African students for African literature propelled his encounter with Equiano.

Edwards joined Edinburgh University in 1963. Encouraged by Chinua Achebe, and assisted by historian Christopher Fyfe, in 1967 he published an abridged edition of Equiano's autobiographical Narrative in Heinemann's African Writers Series, under the title Equiano's Travels. He subsequently published a facsimile version of the Narrative, and another edited version under the title The Life of Olaudah Equiano.

Edwards introduced a final year Honours option on "Caribbean and West African Literature", which he taught with Kenneth Ramchand. He became Reader in English Literature, and was subsequently awarded a personal chair as Professor of English and African Literature.

He died on 10 May 1992. In March 1994, a conference entitled "Africans and Caribbeans in Britain: Writing, History, and Society" was held in his memory at Edinburgh's Centre of African Studies. A collection of essays in his memory appeared in 1998.

== Works ==
- (ed.) West African Narrative: an anthology for schools, 1963.
- (ed.) Modern African Narrative: an anthology, 1966.
- (ed.) Through African Eyes, Cambridge: Cambridge University Press, 1966
- (ed.) Equiano's Travels: The Interesting Narrative of the Life of Olaudah Equiano or Gustavus Vassa, the African by Olaudah Equiano. London: Heinemann, 1967. African Writers Series 10.
- (ed.) A Ballad Book for Africa, London: Faber, 1968.
- (tr. with Hermann Pálsson) Gautrek's Saga, and other medieval tales, London: University of London Press, 1968.
- (with Kenneth Ramchand) "Introduction" to The Year in San Fernando, Michael Anthony, London: Heinemann Caribbean Writers Series, 1970
- (tr. with Hermann Pálsson) Arrow-Odd: a medieval novel, New York: New York University Press, 1970
- (with Hermann Pálsson) Legendary Fiction in Medieval Iceland, Reykjavík: University of Iceland, 1970
- (with Kenneth Ramchand) "Introduction" to The Mystic Masseur, VS Naipaul, London: Heinemann Caribbean Writers Series, 1971
- (tr. with Hermann Pálsson) Hrolf Gautreksson, a Viking romance, Toronto: University of Toronto Press, 1972
- (tr. with Hermann Pálsson) The Book of Settlements; Landnámabók. Winnipeg: University of Manitoba, 1972
- (tr. with Hermann Pálsson) Eyrbyggja Saga, Toronto: University of Toronto Press, 1973.
- (tr. with Hermann Pálsson) Egil's Saga by Snorri Sturluson. Harmondworth: Penguin Books, 1976.
- (tr. with Hermann Pálsson) Orkneyinga Saga: the history of the Earls of Orkney, London: Hogarth Press, 1978.
- (tr. with Hermann Pálsson) Göngu-Hrólfs Saga, Edinburgh: Canongate Books, 1980.
- Black Personalities in the Era of the Slave Trade, 1983.
- (with David Dabydeen) "Black writers of the 18th and 19th centuries", in David Dabydeen (ed.), The Black Presence in English Literature, 1985, pp. 50–67.
- "Three West African Writers of the 1780s", in Charles T. Davis and Henry Louis Gates Jr., eds, The Slave's Narrative, New York: Oxford University Press, 1985.
- (tr. with Hermann Pálsson) Seven Viking Romances, Harmondsworth: Penguin, 1985.
- (tr. with Hermann Pálsson) Knytlinga Saga: the history of the kings of Denmark, Odense: Odense University Press, 1986.
- (tr. with Hermann Pálsson) Magnus' Saga: the life of St Magnus, Earl of Orkney, 1075–1116, Oxford: Perpetua, 1987.
- (tr. with Hermann Pálsson) Vikings in Russia: Yngvar's saga and Eymund's saga, Edinburgh: Edinburgh University Press, 1989.
- (ed. with David Dabydeen) Black Writers in Britain: 1760–1830, 1991.
- (ed. with Polly Rewt) The letters of Ignatius Sancho by Ignatius Sancho, Edinburgh: University of Edinburgh Press, 1994.
