= 2004 in Belize =

- Decades: 1980s; 1990s; 2000s; 2010s; 2020s
- See also: Other events of 2004; Timeline of Belizean history

Events in the year 2004 in Belize.

== Incumbents ==
- Monarch: Elizabeth II
- Governor-General: Colville Young
- Prime Minister: Said Musa

== Events ==
- St. Viator Vocational High School formed August
- Belize Bird Rescue formed
- George Price Centre for Peace and Development opened to public January 16
- Krem Television formed November
