= 2014 in Belize =

- Decades: 1990s; 2000s; 2010s; 2020s
- See also: Other events of 2014; Timeline of Belizean history

A list of events in the year 2014 in Belize.

== Incumbents ==
- Monarch: Elizabeth II
- Governor General: Colville Young
- Prime Minister: Dean Barrow

== Events ==
- February – Raonel Valdez-Valhuerdis, a fugitive from the US, was arrested in Belize still wearing his ankle monitor while attempting to enter the country illegally from Guatemala. Valdez was accused of the largest gold robbery (110 pounds) in Florida history in 2012.
- 24 March – European Union bans fish imports from Belize due to alleged illegal fishing.
- 24 December – Research of sediments in the Great Blue Hole finds evidence that the Mayan civilization collapsed because of drought.

== Deaths ==
- 26 May – Marcial Mes, politician (b. c. 1949)
- 22 October – Paul Nabor, singer and musician, (b. 1928).
