= 2019 in Belize =

- Decades: 1990s; 2000s; 2010s; 2020s
- See also: Other events of 2019; Timeline of Belizean history

The following lists events in the year 2019 in Belize.

== Incumbents ==
- Monarch: Elizabeth II
- Governor-General: Colville Young
- Prime Minister: Dean Barrow

== Events ==
- 8 May – The 2019 Belizean territorial dispute referendum (regarding the Belizean–Guatemalan territorial dispute) was held (originally scheduled for 10 April). Voters were asked whether the territorial dispute should be referred to the International Court of Justice, and the proposal was approved by 55% of the voters.

== Deaths ==
- 2 March – Derek Aikman, politician (b. 1959).

== See also ==
- Belize at the 2019 Pan American Games
