= 2018 in Belize =

- Decades: 1990s; 2000s; 2010s; 2020s
- See also: Other events of 2018; Timeline of Belizean history

The following lists events in the year 2018 in Belize.

== Incumbents ==
- Monarch: Elizabeth II
- Governor-General: Colville Young
- Prime Minister: Dean Barrow

== Events ==
=== Sports ===
- 4 to 15 April – Belize competed at the 2018 Commonwealth Games in the Gold Coast, Queensland, Australia.

== Deaths ==
- 11 April – Phillip Pipersburg, Olympic sprinter (b. 1955).
