= Beka Lamb =

1982 novel by Zee Edgell

- Author: Zee Edgell
- Language: English
- Genre: Historical, Young adult novel
- Publisher: Heinemann (Caribbean Writers Series)
- Publication date: 1982
- Publication place: Belize
- Media type: Print
- Pages: 172 pp (paperback)
- ISBN: 978-0-435-98844-9
- Followed by: In Times Like These

Beka Lamb is the debut novel from Belizean writer Zee Edgell, published in 1982 as part of the Heinemann Caribbean Writers Series. It won the Fawcett Society Book Prize in 1982 and was one of the first novels from Belize to gain international recognition. In 2022, it was included on the "Big Jubilee Read" list of 70 books by Commonwealth authors, selected to celebrate the Platinum Jubilee of Elizabeth II.

== Plot ==
The book deals with social insecurity, racial prejudice and the rule of the conservative church in a small town. The book's protagonist, Beka Lamb, is a 14-year-old Belizean girl. Beka's best friend, Toycie Qualo, is 17, and in her last year of school gets herself expelled when she becomes pregnant by her boyfriend Emilio Villanueva. Toycie dies after a miscarriage and a short space of time in the local asylum nicknamed "Sea Breeze Hotel". Through flashbacks, points on politics and independence are strongly brought out, since the political struggles for independence in Belize at that time also mirrors Beka's own need for self-rule and her developing maturity. Beka's father (Bill Lamb) cuts down Beka's favorite tree (a bougainvillea) as a sign that the wild ways Beka had picked up must stop at once when she finally tells him that she has failed her exam. Her mother (Lilla Lamb) buys her a special book and pen in which she is told to write any lies or stories that she is tempted to tell, in an effort to curb her tale-telling habit. By the end of the book, Beka has transformed from "a flat-rate Belize creole" to a girl with "high mind", since her troubles have forced her to learn the value of money, education, unity within the community and most of all, some manners and respect. The novel consists of 26 chapters each building up on a certain plot or problem.

== Themes ==
Political theme. One theme prevalent in this novel is the political state of Belize, the movement from British rule is important to this story. The struggle to pull away is very emphasized in the life of Beka, Beka and her family all face social and political obstacles. The struggle of Toycies family to support her education is a result of the poverty in Belize. The struggle of being a woman in Belize is a result of the social struggles that the society has set on them. The text also emphasizes the process of womanhood in a colonial country. Beka Lamb is a story that focuses on the process of womanhood and the development from Childhood to young adulthood. The combinations of colonial expectations, family expectations and educational expectations are all struggles that a young creole girl would face during this time.

== See also ==
- Bildungsroman
