= Angela Gegg =

Belizean artist

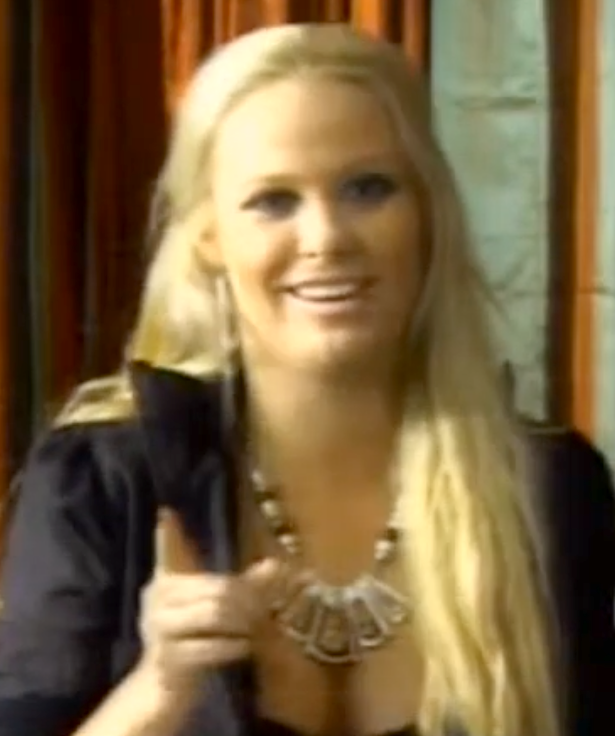
- Hosting OMG in 2011
- Born: 13 November 1979 (age 46); Belize City, Belize
- Known for: Writing, painting, drawing
- Movement: Spoken word, poetry, abstract, cubism
- Website: angelagegg.com

Angela Gegg (born 13 November 1979) is a Belizean artist, author, entertainer, and real estate expert.

Gegg has created music and visual artwork. She has participated in six major solo art shows and more than twenty joint art shows and exhibits in Belize, Texas, New York, Miami, and Trinidad. She has also published her poetry, and is a regular stage performer of the spoken word at events, shows and festivals throughout the country of Belize. She lives in Dubai, UAE where she works as a commercial real estate agent.

She signs some of her works with the pseudonym Proshka, taken from her Latvian grandmother's maiden name.

== Writing ==
Gegg has published the poetry anthologies The Light, the Dark, and Everything in Between in 2006, and Artist Confessions, which was released in connection with her solo exhibition "Impulse" in 2009. Gegg is also spoken word artist and considered to be one of Belize's foremost artistic voices.

She also participated in the cyber-anthology Other Voices International Project in 2008, and was published in Volume 34, The Pages In Between.

== Art ==
Gegg is an abstract surrealist artist who specializes in cubism. Since 2004, she has had six major solo exhibits. She has stated that her main influences as an artist are Salvador Dalí, the father of surrealism; Pablo Picasso, who started the Cubist movement; and Jackson Pollock, an influential American painter and a major figure in the abstract expressionist movement.

=== Art exhibits (solo) ===
- (2004) Subconscious Works of Art, hosted by the Mexican Ambassador and opened by Governor General, Sir Colville Young at the Mexican Institute in Belize City
- (2005) Proshka, the Artist in Action, at the Princess Hotel and Casino in Belize City
- (2006) Hottt Chicks Can Paint Too, opened by Prime Minister Said Musa at the Image Factory in Belize City
- (2006) Belizean Arts Exhibition in San Pedro, Ambergris Caye
- (2009) Impulse, hosted by the Ambassador to Mexico and held at the Institute of Mexico in Belize City
- (2009) Impulse at Belizean Arts on the island of San Pedro, Ambergris Caye

=== Art features ===
- (2005) Clico Art Gallery in Trinidad took notice of Angela Gegg's works of art and purchased REMEMBRANCE and featured her in their 2005 calendar. The artwork now hangs in the Clico Arts Gallery in Trinidad.
- (2007) Made in Belize, Art Book is a contemporaneous art book based on 33 Belizean artists. Author Maggie Turner started composing the book in 2004 and worked with Image Factory curator Gilvano Swasey. Gegg was one of only eight female artists featured in the book, which was launched in 2007.

== Entertainer ==
Gegg has been working in television in Belize since 2004, when she was on the Love FM TV show Cooking with the Smoky Mermaid. She hosted the Channel 7 Carnival for four years, which aired during the September celebrations in Belize.

In November 2006, she was hired by Positive Vibes FM Radio, a newly formed radio station owned by the People's United Party, as one of the hosts for the G2 show, which featured music and poetry.

In 2010 she hosted the game show Tek It or Leave It. In 2011 she hosted her own show OMG.

== Real estate ==
Angela Gegg is licensed in commercial Real estate by Cornell University and RERA in Dubai. She has more than a decade in the field as an industry expert. She is the founder and CEO of Assets Real Estate.

== Publications ==
- The Light, The Dark and Everything In Between, Proshka Productions, 2006, ISBN 976-8197-05-6
- Artist Confessions, Proshka Productions, 2009, ISBN 978-976-95226-0-2
