= Toycie Qualo =

Toycie Qualo is a secondary character in the 1982 novel Beka Lamb by Zee Edgell. She is the best friend of the title character

== Character overview ==
Toycie is a 17-year-old senior at St. Cecilia's Academy in the beginning of the novel. An exemplary student, she aspires to raise both herself and her aunt out of their run-down house and the poverty it signifies. Toycie is seeing Hispanic student Emillio Villanueva, and it appears that everything is going for her.

When Emilio impregnates Toycie and refuses to sanctify their relationship, Toycie loses her interest in school and any ability to function whatsoever. The strict Sister Virgil, St. Cecilia's principal, becomes aware of Toycie's situation, and she immediately expels Toycie, citing an unacceptable lack of modesty for the expulsion. However, Emilio, a student at St. Anthony's, does not appear to face any consequences for his part in the pregnancy. Toycie withdraws from all her former associates and settles into a depressed state. This eventually leads to an accident causing a miscarriage, a stay in the local mental asylum, and ultimately her death during a storm in the Stann Creek Valley (a mango tree fell, crushing her skull while she is wandering about during the storm).

== Role in the novel ==
As Beka remembers, Toycie was her best friend and confidant, mainly because she understood Beka's travails. But the two friends slowly drift apart due to the attentions of Emillio Villanueva and Beka's new drive to succeed academically (a pursuit Toycie had encouraged her in).

To some reviewers, Toycie's plight as a victim of teenage pregnancy has implications for both the social and ethnic development of the nation of Belize. Professor Ervin Beck of Goshen College, Indiana, claims that the novel presents and confirms the Mestizos' increasing dominance of education and economic affairs in the colony, explained by the girls' feeling that "panias" have it better than they do. With regards to Toycie herself, Beck claims her desire to "raise her colour" inevitably brings her into conflict with Emillio and with accepted social standards in the colony, not to mention at her school. Beck also notes that the interplay between Toycie and Emilio foreshadows the dominance of Mestizos in Belizean culture, even dismissing the People's United Party's Central American leanings as indicative of a culture moving away from English influence to Spanish, despite Britain's legal hold on the colony. Ultimately, though, Toycie's main influence is on Beka, who rededicates her life to education after losing her friend and obeys the call presented by her principal below:

We women must learn to control our emotions, Mr. Lamb. There are times we must stand up and say "enough" whatever our feelings. . . . The women will have to decide for a change in their lives, otherwise they will remain vulnerable. (120)

Anthony Sylvestre, an attorney writing for the Belize Times in 2007, coined the phrase "The Toycie Syndrome" to refer to the crime of infanticide, or concealing the death of a child. Of course, Toycie had actually lost the child to a miscarriage by the time of her death, but Sylvestre uses the emotions that befall Toycie as a metaphor in describing the emotion behind child concealment.
