= Selwyn Walford Young =

Belizean musician and composer of the national anthem (1899–1977)

Selwyn Walford Young (February 25, 1899 – 1977), usually known as Walford Young, was a Belizean musician and composer. Among his most famous compositions is the music to Belize's national anthem, "Land of the Free".

== Life and career ==
He was born into a musical family. He graduated from St. John's College, then moved to Chicago where he studied at Chicago Musical College and earned his music PhD from DePaul University. He studied briefly at the Victoria College of Music in London.

After teaching in Chicago for twenty years, he returned to Belize. There he became concertmaster and eventually conductor of the British Honduras Concert Symphony Orchestra.

In 1963, he set to music the 1925 poem "Land of the Gods" written by his friend Samuel Alfred Haynes. In 1981 this song was adopted as Belize's national anthem, with the minor alteration of changing the words "Land of the Gods" to "Land of the Free". This was done without consulting Young or Haynes, and without regard to international copyright status of the song.

In 1993 he was one of the four eminent Belizeans honored on Belizean stamps designed by Laszlo Vasarhelyi. His image appeared on Belize's 60-cent stamp, along with the opening of the refrain of Land of the Free.

== Selected Compositions ==
- Land of the Free (1963), adopted as Belize's national anthem in 1981.
- an arrangement of G. W. Bates' Shake That Thing (1925)
