= Samuel Alfred Haynes =

Belizean soldier, activist and poet, writer of the national anthem (1898–1871)

Samuel Haynes
- Born: Samuel Alfred Haynes; 1899
- Died: 1971 (aged 71–72)
- Occupation: Civil rights activist
- Known for: writing the Belizean national anthem

Samuel Alfred Haynes (1898–1971) was a Belizean soldier, activist and poet. He is best known for writing the words to the national anthem of Belize, "Land of the Free". Haynes served in the British Army during the First World War and, on his return home, helped to quell a riot by fellow veterans. He impressed black nationalist Marcus Garvey during a 1921 visit to the colony and afterwards travelled to the United States to work with Garvey's Universal Negro Improvement Association.

== Military service ==
Samuel Alfred Haynes was born in the colony of British Honduras in 1898 and grew up in its capital, Belize Town. During the First World War Haynes served with the British Army's West Indies Regiment in the Middle Eastern theatre. Upon his return to Belize Haynes wrote of the racial discrimination he had suffered. When his contingent had arrived at a camp in Egypt tired and hungry they began to sing Rule Britannia but were stopped by British soldiers who demanded "who gave you niggers authority to sing that" and evicted them from a building. Upon his return from the war he became an advocate for racial equality in Belize and for independence from the United Kingdom.

On 22 July 1919 Belize experienced riots by recently returned black servicemen. The rioters broke windows and looted shops across Belize Town and the colonial government was powerless to stop them until a contingent of loyal veterans, led by Haynes, assisted in restoring order. Haynes received a commendation for his efforts in apprehending looters. In April 1920 Haynes wrote to governor Eyre Hutson to request pardons for men imprisoned over the rioting.

== Black nationalism ==
Haynes was a founder member of the British Honduras branch of Jamaican black nationalist Marcus Garvey's Universal Negro Improvement Association (UNIA). He later became its general secretary.

Garvey was impressed by Haynes when he visited Belize in 1921 and offered to find him a role in the United States. Haynes left British Honduras that year and became President of the Pittsburgh Division of the UNIA and editor/writer for the Negro World. For a brief period in 1929 Haynes was the Official American Representative for the UNIA-ACL under Garvey.

== National anthem ==
In 1929, Haynes composed the words of a poem named "Land of the Gods". In 1930 with the assistance of Selvyn Young, “Land of the Gods,” was composed into a musical arrangement, first used in 10th of September celebrations. The song was adopted as Belize's national anthem "Land of the Free" upon achieving independence in 1981.

Haynes died in 1971.

== Sources ==
- "BELIZE : Belize National Anthem - Land of the Free"
- SilverTorch Belize Quiz
