= Hermann Pálsson =

Icelandic academic (1921–2002)

- Born: 26 May 1921; Near Blönduós, Iceland
- Died: 11 August 2002 (aged 81); Bourgas, Bulgaria
- Occupations: Icelandic scholar and translator

Hermann Pálsson (26 May 1921 – 11 August 2002) was an Icelandic language scholar and translator, "one of the most distinguished scholars of Icelandic studies of his generation". Often working in collaboration with others such as Magnus Magnusson or Paul Edwards, he translated around 40 works of medieval Icelandic literature.

== Life ==
Hermann Pálsson was born at Sauðanes á Ásum, a farm near Blönduós and the Húnafjördur in the north of Iceland in 1921. Though he was the sixth of 12 children, and the family was not rich, he managed to gain a degree in Icelandic Studies at the University of Iceland in Reykjavík in 1947. From there he moved to take another honours degree, in Irish Studies, at the National University of Ireland in Dublin in 1950.

His first books reflected his Celtic interests: a volume of ancient Irish tales, Irskar fornsögur (1953), and another of Gaelic poetry from the Hebrides, Söngvar frá Sudureyjum (1955), both translated into Icelandic. He also learned Welsh in the 1950s. Decades later he would recount "the sufferings of a loquacious and not utterly teetotal young Icelander 'immersed' in a Calvinistic – and dry – village in Gwynedd".

In 1950 he was appointed Lecturer in Icelandic in the Department of English Language at the University of Edinburgh. In 1953 he married Stella Þorvarðardóttir. Appointed to a personal chair as Professor of Icelandic Studies in 1982, he retired in 1988, becoming an Honorary Fellow of Scandinavian Studies at Edinburgh. He continued to publish books, articles and scholarly editions, including editions of the great Eddic poems Hávamál and Völuspá. Keltar á Islandi (1996) was a study of the Celts and Celtic influence in Iceland. He died at Bourgas in Bulgaria on 11 August 2002.

== Selected works ==
- Hrímfaxi. Hestanöfn frá fyrri tíð til vorra daga og litir íslenska hestsins (1995)
- Keltar á Íslandi (1996)
- Úr landnorðri. Samar og ystu rætur íslenskrar menningar (1997)
- Hávamál í ljósi íslenskrar menningar (1999)
- Vínland hið góða og írskar ritningar (2001)
- Sólarljóð og vitranir annarlegra heima (2002)
- Grettis saga og íslensk siðmenning (2002)
- Atviksorð í þátíð (2005)

== See also ==
- Icelandic literature
- Old Norse literature

== Related reading ==
- Sagnaskemmtun : studies in honour of Hermann Pálsson on his 65th birthday, 26th May 1986 (edited by Rudolf Simek, et al., Vienna: Böhlau Verlag, 1986) ISBN 3205066006 German
