= Christine Craig =

Jamaican writer living in Florida, US (born 1943)

- Born: 24 June 1943 (age 83); Kingston, Jamaica
- Education: University of the West Indies
- Occupation: Writer

Christine Craig (born 24 June 1943) is a Jamaican writer living in Florida, United States. She has published collections of poetry and short stories, as well as children's fiction and several non-fiction works. In the late 1970s, she helped establish the Women's Bureau in Jamaica.

== Biography ==
Christine Craig was born in Kingston, Jamaica. She was raised by her grandparents, who were both teachers, in rural Saint Elizabeth Parish. In 1980, she received a BA from the University of the West Indies.

In 1989, she took part in the International Writing Program at the University of Iowa. She later moved to Fort Lauderdale, Florida.

== Career ==
Craig writes in both standard Jamaican English and Jamaican Patois, and often writes about her connections to Jamaica and the social conditions of Jamaicans and others in the world. She says she was inspired by the hills and flatlands of Saint Elizabeth Parish, where she grew up.

Thematically, her work explores the durability of love, the importance of moral order despite social division, gender, ecological concerns, and the sensuousness of experience in the world. She has also written non-fiction on issues of health and feminism.

=== Publications ===
In 1970, she published her first work, Emanuel and His Parrot, a children's book, followed by a sequel, Emmanuel Goes to Market, the following year. She began publishing poetry in the late 1970s and was published in Mervyn Morris and Pamela Mordecai's anthology Jamaica Woman in 1980. She published her first poetry collection, Quadrille for Tigers, in 1984.

In 1993, Craig published a collection of short stories, Mint Tea. She also researched, wrote and presented a series of stories on Jamaican history for children's television, including in Ring Ding. In 2010, she republished Quadrille for Tigers alongside a new collection, All Things Bright, as Christine Craig: Poems: All Things Bright & Quadrille for Tigers.

=== Advocacy, editing and teaching ===
In the 1980s, Craig was instrumental in establishing Jamaica's Women's Bureau. She also co-authored and co-edited Guyana at the Crossroads (University of Miami, 1992) and the Jamaica National Report on the Environment and Development (Government of Jamaica, 1992) for the Earth Summit, respectively.

From 1990 to 1998, Craig was an editor for The Jamaica Gleaner, based in their Miami office. From 1998 to 2000, she was publications manager at the National Council on Compensation Insurance in Boca Raton.

Craig tutored English literature at the University of the West Indies. In Florida, was adjunct professor at Barry University in Florida from 1996 to 1997, and at Broward College in Fort Lauderdale from 2010 to 2014.

== Reception ==
Reviewing her first book, Mint Tea and Other Stories, Publisher's Weekly gave an early negative review, describing Craig's stories as "bland" and concluding, "Lush settings are sometimes well described and evocative, but they rarely host any action." Later reviews were more complementary, in particular about her poetry. For instance, writing on her contribution to Jamaica Woman, Faythe Turner says that Craig's deference to "past generations of mothers and grandmothers as a 'silent legacy', a compost set aside to nourish freedom for the present generation of women" is "life-giving to see".

In the Encyclopedia of Post-Colonial Literatures in English, Elaine Savory remarks on Craig's "strong awareness" of form and imagery. She writes, "Her observations on the ordinary are often quite striking . . . and frequently reflect the intersection of gender, race and class consciousness." Vahni Capildeo writes that Craig has a "sensuous appreciation of Caribbean-ness evident in the images . . . grounded in a politics of respect". Further, they add, the last impression is of "a beaming and disillusioned goodness".

Jamaican journalist Al Creighton said Craig was recognised early in her career as "one of the new rising poets in Jamaica" that helped establish Caribbean literature in the 1970s. He added that "she finds herself in the company of such poets as Senior, Goodison and Mordecai in her treatment of women in the oppressed, unprivileged, social environments". Literary scholar Carolyn Cooper places her among "that company of 'women writers' who work in Jamaica and draw their substance from its difficult earth".

In writing of Craig's impact on Jamaican literature, Dr Heather Russell, an English studies lecturer at Florida International University, described her as "one of our most talented, powerful, and relevant poets". She says that Craig gives a voice to "the great, the small, the wise, the wonderful, to creation . . . and it is . . . beautiful!" In 2010, scholar Peggy Antrobus and journalist and poet Nan Peacocke said of the poem "Coda" in Quadrille for Tigers, "Christine Craig's poetic insight into the man/woman story in Caribbean polity is as acute now as it was three decades ago."

== Selected works ==
- Emanuel and His Parrot (Oxford University Press, 1970)ISBN 9780192796622
- Emanuel Goes to Market, children's fiction (Oxford University Press, 1971) ISBN 9780192796738
- Sunday in the lane
- Everything but the Ring, from original research conducted by Margaret Forte (Kingston, Jamaica: Bureau of Women's Affairs, 1982)
- "Wonderful Adventures of Mrs Seacole in Many Lands: Autobiography as literary genre and a window to character", Caribbean Quarterly, Vol. 30, No. 2 (1984)
- Quadrille for Tigers, poetry (Berkeley, California: Mina Press, 1984)ISBN 9780942610024
- The Bird Gang, children's fiction (Oxford: Heinemann Caribbean Writers Series, 1990)ISBN 9789766051112
- Guyana at the Crossroads, non-fiction (University of Miami, 1992), with Denis WatsonISBN 9781560006435, 9781560000730
- Jamaica National Report on the Environment and Development (Kingston, Jamaica: Government of Jamaica, 1992), co-editor
- Mint Tea and Other Stories, fiction (Oxford: Heinemann, 1993, ISBN 978-0435989323)
- Christine Craig: Poems: All Things Bright & Quadrille for Tigers, new and collected poetry (Leeds, UK: Peepal Tree Press, 2010, ISBN 9781845231729)
- Before the Rain, fiction and poetry (Leeds, UK: Peepal Tree Press, 2026, ISBN 9781845236090)
