= In Times Like These =

1991 novel by Zee Edgell

- Author: Zee Edgell
- Language: English
- Genre: Historical novel
- Publisher: Heinemann (Caribbean Writers Series)
- Publication date: 1991
- Publication place: Belize
- Media type: Print
- Pages: 307 (paperback)
- ISBN: 0-435-98927-8

In Times Like These is the second novel from Belizean-American author Zee Edgell, published in 1991.

== Plot summary ==
Main character Pavana Leslie is returning to Belize following a vacation in the United States to take up a post at the Women's Department — and walks right into trouble. Belize is in turmoil following the announcement of a possible plan to end the claim to Belizean territory by Guatemala by working out an agreement between the two countries. Unfortunately, Belizeans have rejected this agreement wholesale. Worse yet, the man in charge of convincing them, Cabinet member Alex Abrams, was a former boyfriend of Pavana's and the father of her twins Lisa and Eric, and is being pressured by another former friend and leader of the resistance movement, Stoner Bennett, to denounce the agreement. Pavana must deal with her past relations with Bennett and Abrams in London and the decision that changed her life, her present troubles with coworkers at the Department who keep introducing politics to the equation, and her future: a relationship with the divorced Julian Carlisle, a development aid worker. When tragedy strikes, Pavana must draw on all her resources to come up with a solution — to Belize's problems and her own.
