= The Festival of San Joaquin =

1997 novel by Zee Edgell

- Book cover
- Author: Zee Edgell
- Language: English
- Subject: English Literature
- Genre: Novel
- Publisher: Heinemann (Caribbean Writers Series)
- Publication date: 1997
- Publication place: Belize
- Media type: Print
- Pages: 155 (paperback)
- ISBN: 0-435-98948-0

The Festival of San Joaquin is a 1997 novel, the third from Belizean-American Zee Edgell. In a change from her first two novels, Beka Lamb and In Times Like These, the story is set in the village of San Joaquín, Corozal District.

== Synopsis ==
Upon her release from prison, protagonist Luz Marina must figure out how to approach her mother-in-law in order to gain back the custody of her children, Teresa, Edwardo and Feliciano. She went to prison for the death of her husband whom she had killed in self defense.

The mother of her husband was Dona Catalina Casal, her husband was Don Pablo and their children were Andres Casal, LuisCasal and Salvador Juaquin. Marina sisters were Concha and Perla. Her mother was named Mama Sofia and her father was Papa Apolonio.

Marina had worked at the home of the Casal family before she married Salvador. Salvador was in love with the future wife of his brother Luis. Luz flashes back on the night of her 15th birthday, the same night as Luis' engagement party. She remembers when Salvador abused her and her children. He would always lock them in the house for weeks without eating or drinking anything. Feliciano is sick and in a coma because of Salvador.

Her father dies and Don Pablo leaves San Joaquín so Dona Catalina now becomes a dedicated business woman. Marina tries to uplift herself and her mother since her father is no longer with them. She searches for jobs but is always rejected. The only job she got was in Elodio Alpuche Guerra's office, but she was fired because of Dona Catalina who was also a member of the office.

Andres Casal offers her a job at his hotel named CANNA Hotel (Sky Palace). She was offered the job of gardener. Andres Casal had loved Luz Marina before and he asked her to marry him. She decided to leave the job and she and her mother open a cafe named Cafe Feliciano. The cafe is shut down because they needed running water, proper garbage disposal and to get rid of the flies. She went to the representative's office for help so she can reopen, but learns that Dona Catalina was responsible.

The novel takes place during the festival of the patron saint of the village.
