= Time and the River =

2007 novel by Zee Edgell

- Book cover
- Author: Zee Edgell
- Language: English
- Genre: Historical novel
- Publisher: Heinemann (Caribbean Writers Series)
- Publication date: 31 March 2007
- Publication place: Belize
- Media type: Print
- Pages: 206 (paperback)

Time and the River is the fourth released novel by author Zee Edgell, published in 2007 in Heinemann's Caribbean Writers Series. Edgell announced the arrival of the book in January and appeared in Belize in March at the University of Belize in Belmopan and in Belize City promoting the book.

== Plot summary ==
Main character Leah Lawson, 18, is a slave in mid to late 19th century Belize (the colony of British Honduras not having been formed until 1862). The story traces her rise in stature to slaveowner, continuing the tradition of female protagonists in Edgell works.

== Reception ==
Early reviews from Andrew Steinhauer of The Belize Times noted that the characters and discussion prevalent in all Edgell novels are "industrial grade" here, and expressed problems with the cover.
