= 2012 Belizean municipal elections =

Municipal elections were held in Belize on 7 March 2012 at the same time as the Belizean general election. The United Democratic Party (UDP) won six municipalities, while the People's United Party (PUP) won three municipalities.

== Participating parties ==
The following political parties participated in the municipal elections:

- United Democratic Party
- People's United Party
- Vision Inspired by the People (Belmopan and Belize City only)
- People's National Party (Punta Gorda only)

== Voter turnout ==
- Belize City: 63.14%
- Belmopan: 72.22%
- Benque Viejo: 75.69%
- Corozal: 73.66%
- Dangriga: 63.21%
- Orange Walk: 76.52%
- Punta Gorda: 68.80%
- San Ignacio/Santa Elena: 64.50%
- San Pedro: 69.39%

== Results ==
=== Belize City ===
Darrell Bradley was elected mayor of Belize City on the UDP ticket with 49 percent of the vote, defeating PUP nominee Karen Bodden, VIP nominee Paco Smith, and three independent candidates. The UDP also swept all 10 seats on the Belize City Council.

=== Belmopan ===
In Belmopan, UDP mayoral candidate Simeon Lopez defeated the PUP's Jorge B. Flores and the VIP's Paul Marcel Morgan. The UDP also won four of the six city council seats.

=== Towns ===
- Benque Viejo del Carmen: Miguel Angel Velasquez (UDP) elected mayor; UDP wins town council 6-0.
- Corozal Town: Hilberto Campos (UDP) elected mayor; UDP wins town council 6-0.
- Dangriga: Major H. Gilbert Swaso (PUP) elected mayor; PUP wins town council 6-0.
- Orange Walk Town: Kevin Bernard (PUP) elected mayor; PUP wins town council 6-0.
- Punta Gorda: Anthony Fuentes (PUP) elected mayor; PUP wins town council 5-1.
- San Ignacio/Santa Elena: John August, Jr. (UDP) elected mayor; UDP wins town council 6-0.
- San Pedro Town: Daniel Guerrero (UDP) elected mayor; UDP wins town council 5-1.
