= Belize–Guatemala Partial Scope Agreement =

The Belize–Guatemala Partial Scope Agreement is a preferential trade agreement between the counties of Belize and Guatemala. Negotiations for the agreement began on November 22, 2004. Both countries signed the agreement on June 26, 2006. Belize ratified the agreement in 2009 and Guatemala ratified it in 2010. The agreement came into effect on April 4, 2010, thirty days after Guatemalan ratification.
