= Belize High School =

- The official logo of Belize High School: To include all religions; Appreciation for the Arts; Green Technology and a cleaner future; Tradition of Excellence

Location
- Mercy Lane; Belize City; Belize
- Coordinates: 17.506578°N 88.197933°W

Information
- Type: Private
- Motto: Learners Today, Leaders Tomorrow. As one is gone, another is born.
- Established: 2010
- President: Deanna Nisbet
- Principal: Jamie Usher
- Classes: 8
- Campus: Urban
- Colours: Blue, gold and white
- Yearbook: The Time Capsule
- Website: www.bhsbes.edu.bz

Belize High School is a secondary school, high school in Belize City, Belize.

== History ==
In 2009, fifteen years after opening the Belize Elementary School, the Board of Governors sought to explore and develop the concept of a new high school. In 2010, The school was located at the University of the West Indies Open Campus facility on Princess Margaret Drive, Belize City during its first year. In 2011, Belize High School had moved to the same campus as Belize Elementary School.

== Education ==
Belize High School installed Smart Board technology for their education system. They are the first school in Belize to utilize the Smart Board. It is the only high school in Belize where laptops are required in classes.

== Academic Advising ==
Belize High School employs an academic counsellor. Roles:

- Assist in identifying junior colleges, college universities that fit individual student needs and participate in the admission process.
- Fulfilling college requirements (student curriculum vitae)
- Empower and guide students thought the year, keeping goals at the forefront.
- Assist with seeking financial aid and scholarships available to students at tertiary level.
- Organize career day and guest speakers.
- Facilitate visits from college representatives and/or arrange tours abroad for students.
- Aid the student with arranging external exams, CXCs, SATs, etc.
