= National Transportation Services Limited =

Transport company

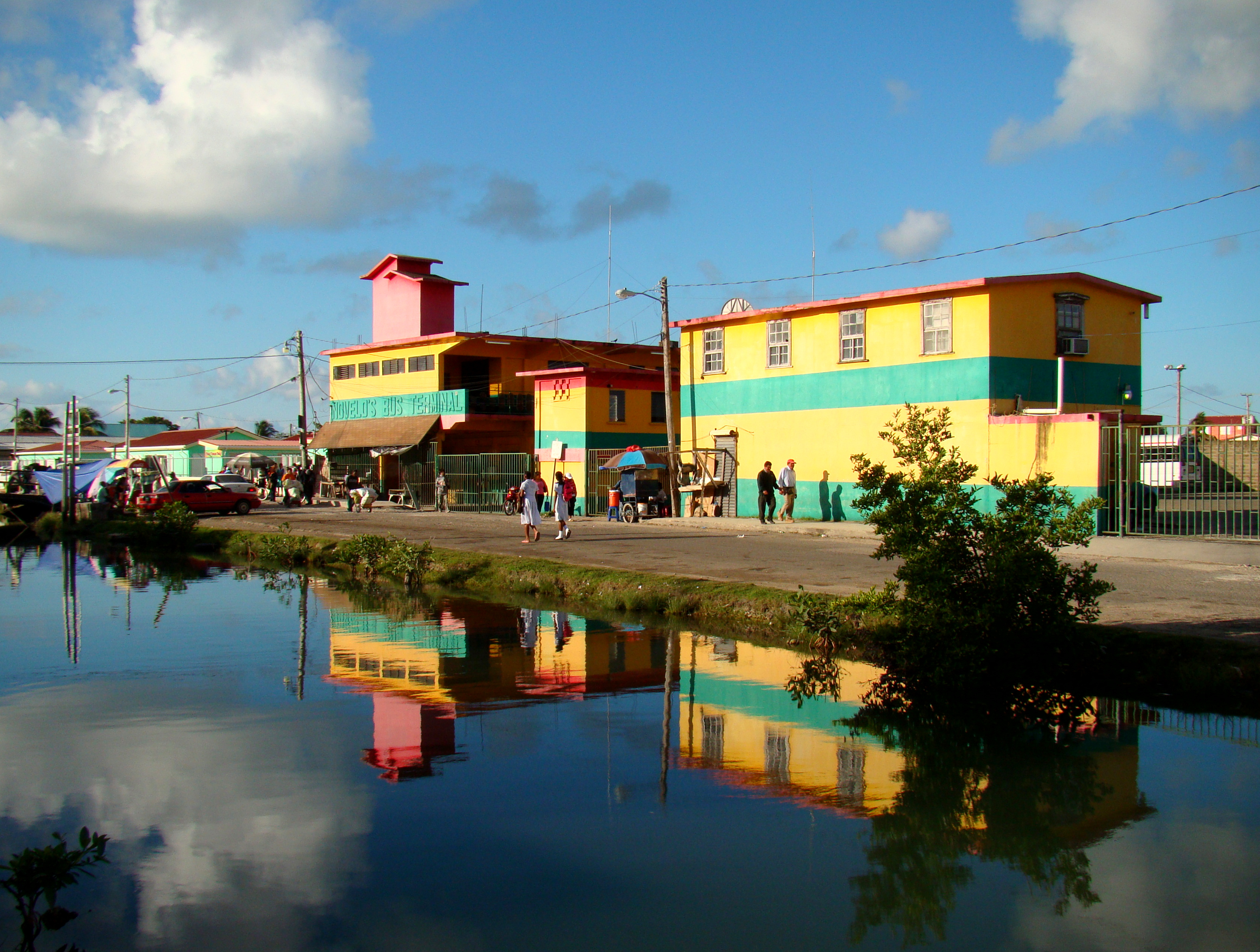
The Novelo's Bus Terminal in Belize City

National Transportation Services Limited is a national transport carrier serving all major districts of Belize. Established in January 2006 following the collapse of the former Novelo's Bus Lines Limited, the reigning monopoly company in Belizean transportation, the NTSL is run by the former owners of that company, David and Antonio Novelo, on much the same permits as the original Novelo's.However this company too has failed like its predecessor. In 2010 to 2011 a massive void was dented into the transport system for Belize when the company went into bankruptcy.

== Routes ==
As of February 2007:

1. Belize City-Chetumal, Quintana Roo, Mexico
- stops in Corozal and Orange Walk
- daily from 5:00 AM to 5:00 PM (Corozal and OW to 9:00 pm)
1. Belize City-Melchor de Mencos, Peten, Guatemala
- stops in Belmopan, San Ignacio and Benque Viejo
- daily from 5:00 AM to 9:00 PM
1. Belize City-Punta Gorda Town, Toledo District
- stops in Belmopan, Dangriga, Independence Village
- daily from 5:00 AM to 9:00 PM
1. Other routes: Dangriga-Independence-Placencia, etc.

Buses are classified as either Regular runs (usual prices) or Express runs (faster, for slightly higher prices).

== History ==
In December 2005, the former Novelo's Bus Line shut down abruptly after more than two and a half decades of transportation service in Belize.

Beginning in about 1998, the Novelo brothers, David and Antonio, embarked on an ambitious plan to control all transport services in Belize. They began buying up smaller, competing companies, including Batty's Bus Line, their largest competitor, and Venus Line, owned by Corozal's Froylan Gilharry. Before long, Novelo's controlled the Northern routes to Corozal and the Orange Walk Districts, the Western route to Cayo and most of the southern route to Dangriga and Punta Gorda (the rest was patrolled by P.G.'s James Bus Line), having bought out companies running these routes. The Novelos used monies borrowed from the Development Finance Corporation to pay for these takeovers and operational costs.

As often happens with monopolies, hiccups in the industry began to affect the company. Gas prices soared, and it quickly became more expensive to maintain 24-hour-a-day routes. At the same time, monies were due to the Atlantic and Belize Banks, which had bankrolled the expansion plan. By 2005, the situation was too much, and the brothers declared bankruptcy; the once-proud Novelo's Line went into receivership. Even in receivership the company remained unable to lift itself out of trouble, and it went down in December. Meanwhile, the brothers planned to get back into the transport business under a new name: National Transport. This new company would run mainly to the West and North, and in Belize City, under the name Belize In Transit Services.

The wary Ministry of Transport at first refused to give the brothers licenses. Attempts to run the routes without licenses were shut down until the process was complete, but for several days Belizeans had no bus transport.

NTSL now ran in competition with the Belize Bus Drivers (now Owners) Cooperative, consisting of drivers from the old Novelo's group, which broke ranks with the company following the drivers' dismissal in December. The NTSL and BBOC are two of the "big three" of Belizean transport, the other being James, the only company the former Novelos did not buy.

The thirty-million-dollar loan from the DFC, borrowed by the Novelos, became a main topic of the subsequent hearings into the actions of that company beginning in mid-2006 and continuing. Recent revelations to the investigative commission indicate that the Novelos used their clout to fasttrack the loan in one day, an action that infuriated Belizeans. In February 2007, the Novelos appealed to the Supreme Court to halt the commission, charging conflicts of interest with appointed auditor Mark Hulse (who they said had been part of the receivership cadre) and general ignorance of the Novelo side of the story. This case is currently being argued.
