= Leela Vernon =

Belizean musician and cultural preservationist (1950–2017)

- Born: Lila Genus Martinez; 21 October 1950; Adjacency Zone, British Honduras-Guatemala border
- Died: 19 February 2017 (aged 66); Belize City, Belize
- Occupations: musician, cultural preservationist
- Years active: 1987–2016
- Notable work: Ah Wah know who seh Kriol Nuh Gat no Culcha; O, Lan a di free (National Anthem)

Leela Vernon MBE (21 October 1950 – 19 February 2017) was a Belizean cultural icon noted for her contributions to preserving Creole culture in the country. She was awarded the title "Queen of Brukdown", received the Order of the British Empire for promoting Creole culture and music, and was named the Brukdown Artist of the Year in 2004. She was honored as National Hero in 2016 by the National Institute of Culture and History.

== Early life ==
Lila Genus Martinez was born on 21 October 1950 near Punta Gorda in a disputed border region, now known as the "adjacency zone", between British Honduras and Guatemala. Neither country wanted to issue a birth certificate, but eventually, her parents Gladys Matilda Genus and Alfredo Martinez Jiménez were able to secure a birth certificate and passport from Guatemala. Her father was a chiclero, traveling in chicle camps along the border to gather the natural gum and her mother was a cook. Her father was descended of Jemima Hariniah Hause, a runaway slave originally from Sierra Leone, who fled Mexico to Belize and married a Belizean named Harrison. His mother, Secondina Jiménez was of Maya heritage and married a Spanish-Italian baker surnamed Martinez. Her mother's father, Henry Genus had migrated from Jamaica to work for United Fruit in 1897, before settling in British Honduras with his Belizean wife, Jemima.

Leela, as she was called, grew up traveling around the small villages of southern British Honduras(Belize), until around the age of five, when she moved to Punta Gorda to live with her maternal grandparents. She attended St. Peter Claver School from her primary levels through three years of high school before marrying Mario Samuel Vernon, a baker, who later operated the town Texaco station. The Vernons had four children before Mario was murdered in 1981: Juliette, Mario Samuel Jr., France Kevin, and André Robert. Her final child, Danika Sierra, is the daughter of Narmo Sierra.

== Career ==
In 1987, Vernon formed a dance troupe known as the Ibolites (aka Ebolites) with four other dancers. Their goal was to express Kriol culture in traditional music and dance and promote the education of Brukdown and cultural pride in the rich heritage. The group performed at schools all over the country, expanding to over seventy members, and toured throughout the Caribbean, including performances in Dominica, the Dominican Republic, Nicaragua and Panama. In 1991, she performed a song she had written, Ah Wah Know Who Seh Creole No Gàh No Culture (I Want to Know Who Says Creoles Have No Culture), at the Belize Games. The performance, backed up by the Ibolites, was memorable and the song has become one of her most beloved works.

In 1993 she composed and performed, at the Universidad de San Carlos de Guatemala's International Peace and Protest Project, Blackness in the Sunrise. The song, about slavery in the region, was recognized with a ribbon. In 1994, the group was selected as one of the artistic performances for Queen Elizabeth's visit. Vernon composed a song, Welcome to Belize by the Sea for the special performance for the monarch. The following year, they toured internationally, performing in New York City and Veracruz, Mexico. In 1997, the group joined with the Belize National Dance Company on a trip to France and Spain, where Vernon worked as a cultural choreographer for more than fifty performances.

In 2001, she released a CD Kriol Kolcha with the lead song, Ah Wah Know Who Seh Creole No Gàh No Culture. In 2011, her fifth CD was launched featuring a translation of the Belizean National Anthem Land of the Free into the Kriol language as O, Lan a di free. Because Kriol is the lingua franca in Belize, Vernon felt that better understanding of the words among the country's diverse ethnic groups would result from having the anthem available in Kriol.

Vernon co-founded, along with one of her daughters, the first Creole Council of Belize in Punta Gorda. When in 1995, The National Kriol Council was formed in Belize City, Vernon was one of the drivers of the organization and was elected the inaugural vice president. Among their many projects are language standardization, and publishing books such as dictionaries and the Bible in the Kriol language.

In 2004, Vernon won the national Brukdown Contest and was crowned Artist of the Year. In 2007, she was awarded the Order of the British Empire in recognition of her efforts to promote Kriol music and culture. In 2011, she received the title Woman of the Year in a cultural award given by Flavors Entertainment and in 2016, Vernon was designated as a National Hero by the Belizean National Institute of Culture and History.
