= The Independent (Belize) =

The Independent was a Belizean newspaper published weekly on Tuesdays and selling for $1.00.

== Premise ==
According to News 5, the first issue of the Independent (also known as the Independent Reformer) hit newsstands on November 28, 2006. It quoted the editorial as stating that the majority of pieces in the Independent will be "opinion/editorial" type rather than hard news.

After a run of some 60+ issues, the Independent has ceased publication as of October 2007, confirmed by a Karla Vernon letter to the Amandala.

== Staff ==
Meb Cutlack, editorial director of the Independent. The Australian has previously written for the Reporter and contributed to the Amandala.

Karla Vernon, general editor. The media veteran has worked for the former Radio Belize, Channel 5, The Reporter and The San Pedro Sun. Her husband Trevor will serve as business manager; he heads the Independent's publishing company, Independent Publishing, and National Printers, the printing home of the Independent.

== Criticism ==
Before it printed a single page, the Independent was criticized by The Belize Times, paper for the ruling People's United Party. The Times claims the Independent, based on the record of Cutlack and Vernon, will be pro-UDP, but welcomed them nonetheless. Vernon claims that pressure from political parties undermined the Independent's success.

Channel 5, in reporting the story on November 7, poked fun at Cutlack's aggressive writing style, but praised its former news editor Vernon as a balance to Cutlack.
