= Tek It or Leave It =

Television series

- Starring: Angela Gegg
- Country of origin: Belize
- Original language: English
- No. of seasons: 1

Production
- Running time: 30 minutes (with commercials)

Original release
- Network: Channel 5
- Release: 2 December 2008 – 17 February 2009

Tek It or Leave It was a Belizean game show modeled after Deal or No Deal. The show was pre-recorded every Wednesday at 8:30 p.m. and it aired the following Tuesday at 8:00 p.m. on Channel 5. It was first recorded on November 26, 2008, and first aired on December 2, 2008. The show ran for one season over 13 weeks. It was hosted by Angela Gegg, a well known Belizean artist. The last episode aired on February 17, 2009.

== Gameplay ==
One lucky audience member is selected and has the chance to win up to 5,000 Belize dollars (US$2,500), although on some occasions, the grandprize would be 10,000 dollars. On the season finale on February 11, 2009, it was even raised to 15,000 dollars, which was won by the player.

=== Box values ===
==== Regular ====
$0.01
$1
$5
$10
$20
$40
$60
$80
$100
$125
$150
$175
$200

$300
$400
$500
$600
$700
$800
$900
$1,000
$2,000
$2,500
$3,000
$3,500
$5,000

==== Special ====
$1
$5
$10
$20
$40
$80
$120
$160
$200
$250
$300
$350
$400

$600
$800
$1,000
$1,200
$1,400
$1,600
$1,800
$2,000
$4,000
$5,000
$6,000
$7,000
$10,000

==== Season finale ====
$0.01
$1
$15
$30
$60
$120
$180
$240
$300
$375
$450
$525
$600

$900
$1,200
$1,500
$1,800
$2,100
$2,400
$2,700
$3,000
$6,000
$7,500
$9,000
$12,000
$15,000
