= Zee Edgell =

Belizean-born American writer (1940–2020)

Zee Edgell MBE
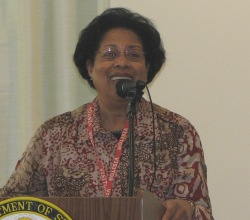
- Edgell in 2007
- Born: Zelma Inez Tucker; 21 October 1940; Belize City, Belize
- Died: 20 December 2020 (aged 80); St. Louis, Missouri, US
- Occupations: Novelist, short story writer
- Writing career
- Period: 1982–2020
- Genres: Young adult, women
- Notable work: Beka Lamb (1982)

Zelma Inez Edgell MBE, better known as Zee Edgell (21 October 1940 – 20 December 2020), was a Belizean-born American writer who published four novels. She retired as a full, tenured professor of English at Kent State University.

== Biography ==
Zelma Inez Tucker was born on 21 October 1940 in Belize City, British Honduras (now Belize), to Veronica (née Walker) and Clive A. Tucker. After attending St. Catherine Academy in Belize City (the basis for St. Cecilia's Academy in her novel Beka Lamb), Edgell studied journalism at the school of modern languages at the Polytechnic of Central London (1965) and continued her education at the University of the West Indies (1990). She worked as a journalist, first working for The Daily Gleaner in Jamaica in 1959, and later serving as the founding editor of The Reporter.

From 1966 to 1968, she taught at St. Catherine Academy in Belize. After serving as editor of The Reporter, she returned to teach at St. Catherine for the 1980–81 school year. From 1981 to 1987, she served as the first Director of the Women's Bureau in the Government of Belize, and later as the Director of the Department of Women's Affairs.

She has also lived for extended periods in such diverse places as Jamaica, Nigeria, Afghanistan, Bangladesh and Somalia, working with development organizations and the Peace Corps. She has been director of women's affairs for the government of Belize, lecturer at the former University College of Belize (forerunner to the University of Belize) and she was an associate professor in the department of English at Kent State University, Kent, Ohio from 1993 to 2009, where she taught creative writing and literature. Edgell also toured internationally, giving book readings and delivering papers on the history and literature of Belize. She is considered Belize's principal contemporary writer.

Edgell was married to American educator Alvin George "Al" Edgell (1924–2020), who had a decades-long career in international development. They raised two children, Holly, a journalist, and Randall, a physician specializing in stroke treatment and prevention.

Edgell contributed extensively to the Belizean Writers Series, published by local publishing house Cubola Productions. She edited and contributed stories to the fifth book in the series, Memories, Dreams and Nightmares: A Short Story Anthology of Belizean women writers, published in 2004.

In 2020, Edgell died at her home in St. Louis, Missouri, at the age of 80. A remembrance ceremony for Edgell was held at the Government House in Belize City in 2022. Speakers included Francis Fonseca and Edgell's daughter, Holly.

== Honours ==
Edgell was appointed a Member of the Order of the British Empire (MBE) in the 2007 Queen's Birthday Honours list for services to literature and to the community.

In 2009 the University of the West Indies conferred upon her the honorary degree D.Litt. at graduation ceremonies in Cave Hill, Barbados.

== Works ==
Edgell's debut novel, Beka Lamb, published in 1982, details the early years of the nationalist movement in British Honduras from the eyes of a teenage girl attending high school in the colony. Published a year after Belize became independent, Beka Lamb was the first novel to be published in the new nation and went on to claim the distinction of being Belize's first novel to gain an international audience, winning Britain's Fawcett Society Book Prize in 1982 (awarded annually to a work of fiction that contributes to an understanding of women's position in society today). Extracts from Beka Lamb have appeared in such anthologies as The Arnold Anthology of Post Colonial Literatures in English, edited by John Thieme (1996), Daughters of Africa, edited by Margaret Busby (1992), and Her True-True Name, edited by Elizabeth Wilson and Pamela Mordecai (1989).

Her subsequent novel, In Times Like These (1991), portrayed the turmoil of nearly independent Belize from the point of view of another female protagonist, this time the adult director of women's affairs (a post Edgell once held).

The Festival of San Joaquin (1997), her third novel, told the story of a woman accused of murdering her husband, and in her short stories, Edgell skillfully explores the layers of Belize's complicated social and racial stratification through the lens of her female protagonists. Edgell said she would eventually like to write about male protagonists as well as her extensive travels across the world. The Festival of San Joaquin, was re-issued by Macmillan Caribbean in October 2008.

Edgell's fourth novel was published by Heinemann's Caribbean Writers Series in January 2007. The events of Time and the River unfold during the heyday of slavery in Belize. It focuses on the life of a young slave woman, Leah Lawson, who eventually (through marriage) becomes a slaveowner herself. She even finds herself in the position of owning her own family members. The story is told against the backdrop of the brutal forestry slavery of the time and slave revolts, true historical moments in the history of the country that is now known as Belize. Edgell marked the release of this book in Belize with appearances at the University of Belize, Belmopan, and in Belize City.

== Bibliography ==
=== Novels ===
- Beka Lamb (1982)
- In Times Like These (1991)
- The Festival of San Joaquin (1997)
- Time and the River (2007)

=== Short stories ===
- "My Uncle Theophilus", The Caribbean Writer, 1998)
- "Longtime Story" in The Whistling Bird: Women Writers of the Caribbean (1998)
- "The Entertainment" in Great River Review (2001)

=== Lectures ===
- "Belize: A Literary Perspective," presented at the Inter-American Development Bank on 30 September 1994, as part of the IDB Cultural Center's Lecture Series
