= History of Belize =

The history of Belize dates back thousands of years. The Maya civilization spread into the area of Belize between 1500 BC to 1200 BC and flourished until about 1000 AD. Several Maya ruin sites, including Cahal Pech, Caracol, Lamanai, Lubaantun, Altun Ha, and Xunantunich reflect the advanced civilization and much denser population of that period. The first recorded European incursions in the region were made by Spanish conquistadors and missionaries in the 16th century. One attraction of the area was the availability of logwood, which also brought British settlers.

Belize was not formally termed the "Colony of British Honduras" until 1862. It became a crown colony in 1871. Subsequently, several constitutional changes were enacted to expand representative government. Internal Self-Government was granted in January 1964. The official name of the territory was changed from British Honduras to Belize in June 1973, and full independence was granted on 21 September 1981.

== Ancient Maya civilization ==
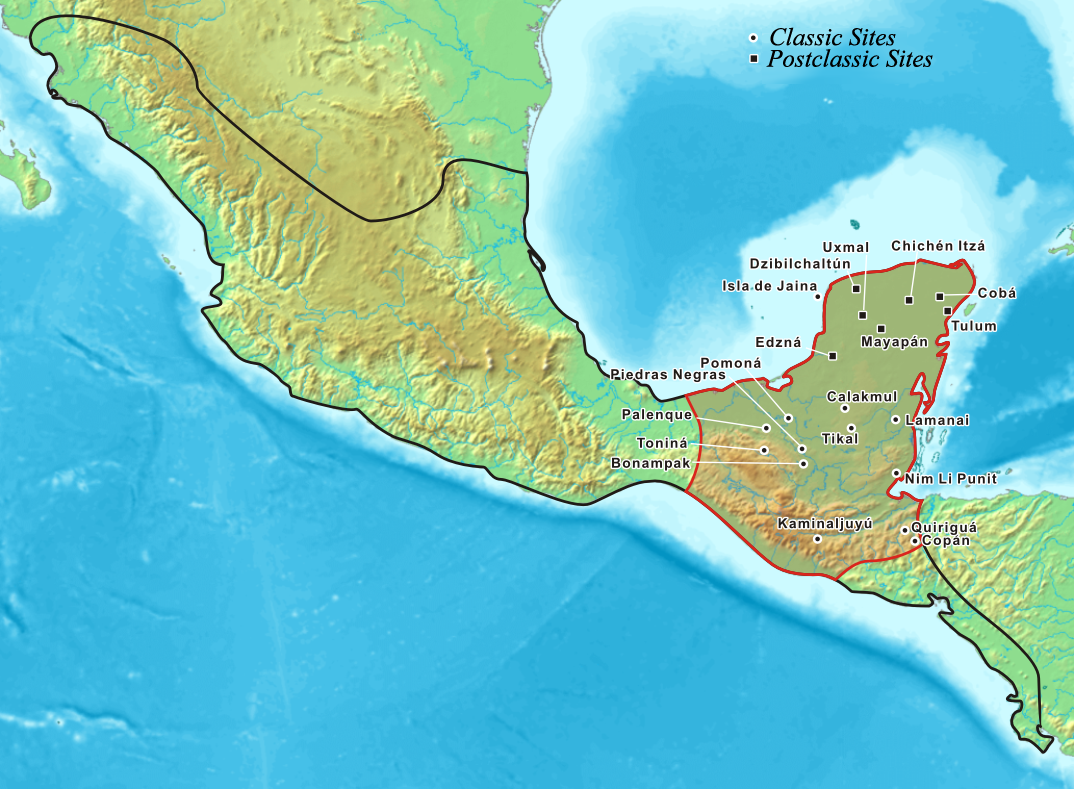
The extent of the Mayan civilization.

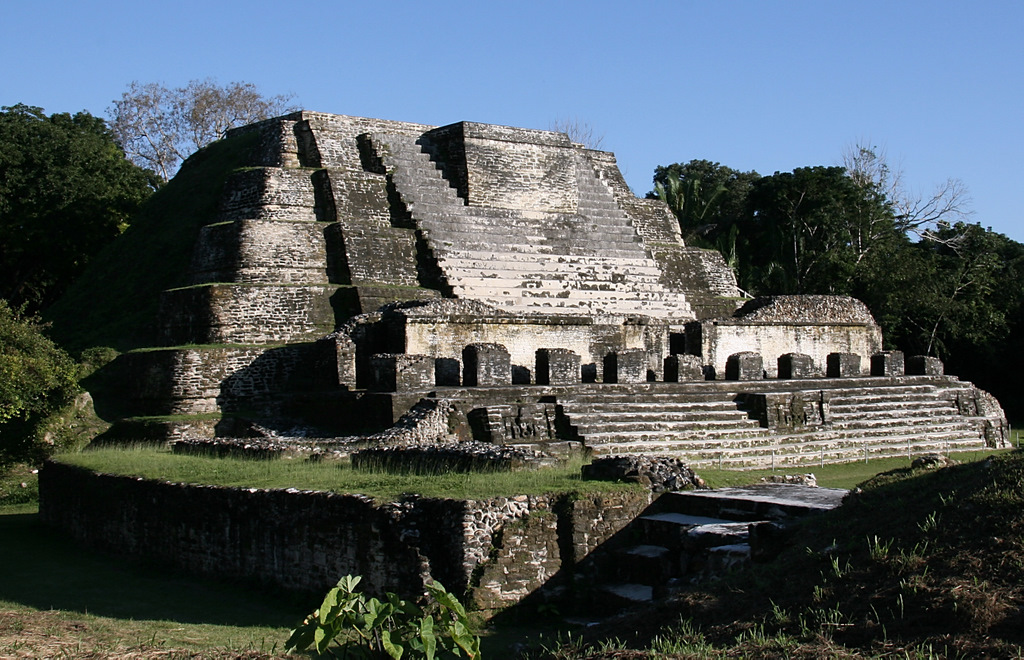
A Mayan temple at Altun Ha.

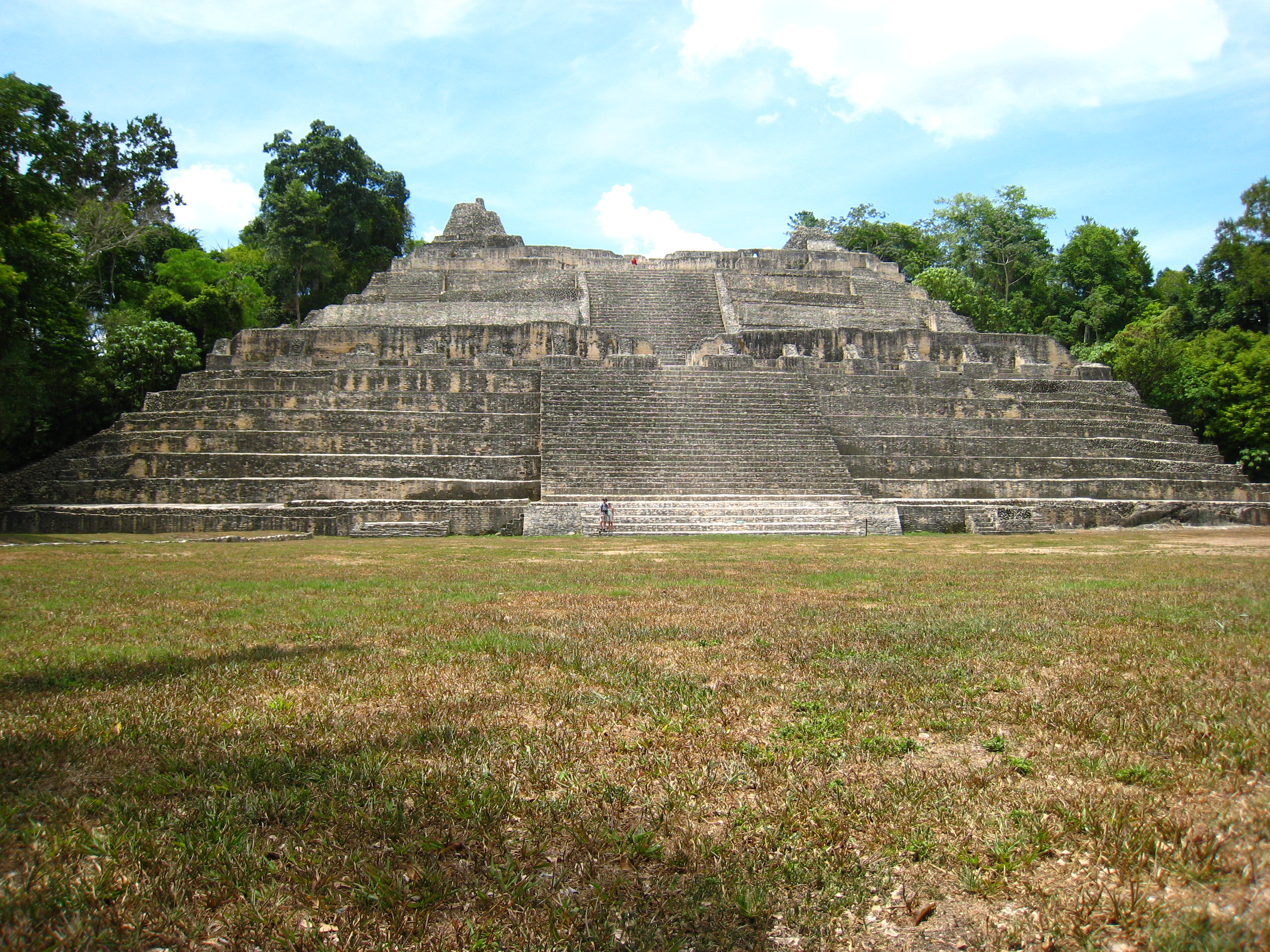
"Caana" at Caracol.

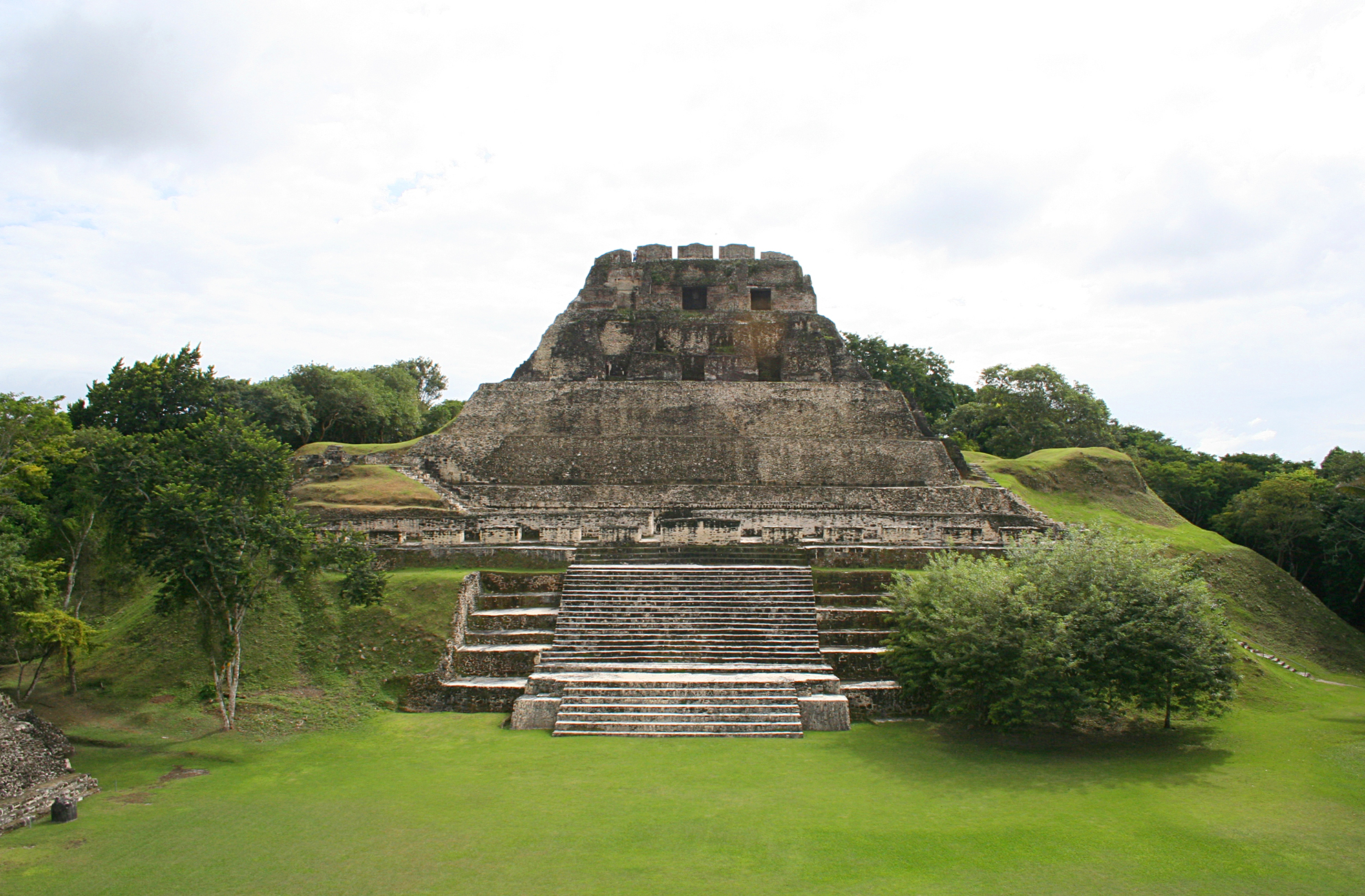
"El Castillo" at Xunantunich.

The Maya civilization emerged at least three millennia ago in the lowland area of the Yucatán Peninsula and the highlands to the south, in what is now southeastern Mexico, Guatemala, western Honduras, and Belize. Many aspects of this culture persist in the area despite nearly 500 years of European domination. Prior to about 2500 BC, some hunting and foraging bands settled in small farming villages; they domesticated crops such as corn, beans, squash, and chili peppers. A profusion of languages and subcultures developed within the Maya core culture. Between about 2500 BC and 250 AD, the basic institutions of Maya civilization emerged. The peak of this civilization occurred during the classic period, which began around 250 AD.

The recorded history of the center and south is dominated by Caracol. The inscriptions on the monuments there are in the Lowland Maya aristocratic tongue Classic Ch'olti'an. North of the Maya Mountains, the inscriptional language at Lamanai was Yucatecan as of 625 AD. The last date recorded in Ch'olti'an within Belizean borders is 859 in Caracol, stele 10. Yucatec civilisation, in Lamanai, lasted longer.

Farmers engaged in various types of agriculture, including labor-intensive irrigated and ridged-field systems and shifting slash-and-burn agriculture. Their products fed the civilization's craft specialists, merchants, warriors, and priest-astronomers, who coordinated agricultural and other seasonal activities with rituals in ceremonial centers. These priests, who observed the movements of the sun, moon, planets, and stars, developed a complex mathematical and calendrical system to coordinate various cycles of time and to record specific events on carved stelae.

The Maya were skilled at making pottery, carving jade, knapping flint, and making elaborate costumes of feathers. The architecture of Maya civilization included temples and palatial residences organized in groups around plazas. These structures were built of cut stone, covered with stucco, and elaborately decorated and painted. Stylized carvings and paintings, along with sculptured stelae and geometric patterns on buildings, constitute a highly developed style of art.

Belize boasts important sites of the earliest Maya settlements, majestic ruins of the classic period, and examples of late postclassic ceremonial construction. About five kilometers west of Orange Walk, is Cuello, a site from perhaps as early as 2,500 BC. Jars, bowls, and other dishes found there are among the oldest pottery unearthed in present-day Mexico and Central America. Cerros, a site on Chetumal Bay, was a flourishing trade and ceremonial center between about 300 BC and 100 AD. One of the finest carved jade objects of Maya civilization, the head of what is usually taken to be the sun god Kinich Ahau, was found in a tomb at the classic period site of Altún Ha, thirty kilometers northwest of present-day Belize City. Other Maya centers located in Belize include Xunantunich and Baking Pot in Cayo District, Lubaantún and Nimli Punit in Toledo District, and Lamanai on Hill Bank Lagoon in Orange Walk District.

In the late classic period, it is estimated that between 400,000 and 1,000,000 people inhabited the area that is now Belize. People settled almost every part of the country worth cultivating, as well as the cay and coastal swamp regions. But in the 10th century, Maya society suffered a severe breakdown. Construction of public buildings ceased, the administrative centers lost power, and the population declined as social and economic systems lost their coherence. Some people continued to occupy, or perhaps reoccupied, sites such as Altun Ha, Xunantunich, and Lamanai. These sites ceased being ceremonial and civic centers. The decline of Maya civilization is still not fully explained. Rather than identifying the collapse as the result of a single factor, many archaeologists now believe that the decline of the Maya was a result of several complex factors and that the decline occurred at different times in different regions.

== Conquest and early colonial period ==
=== Pre-Columbian Maya societies and the conquest ===
Many Maya remained in Belize when the Europeans arrived in the 16th and 17th centuries. Archaeological and ethnohistorical research confirms that several groups of Maya peoples lived in the area now known as Belize in the 16th century. The political geography of that period does not coincide with present-day boundaries, so several Maya provinces lay across the frontiers of modern Belize, Mexico, and Guatemala.

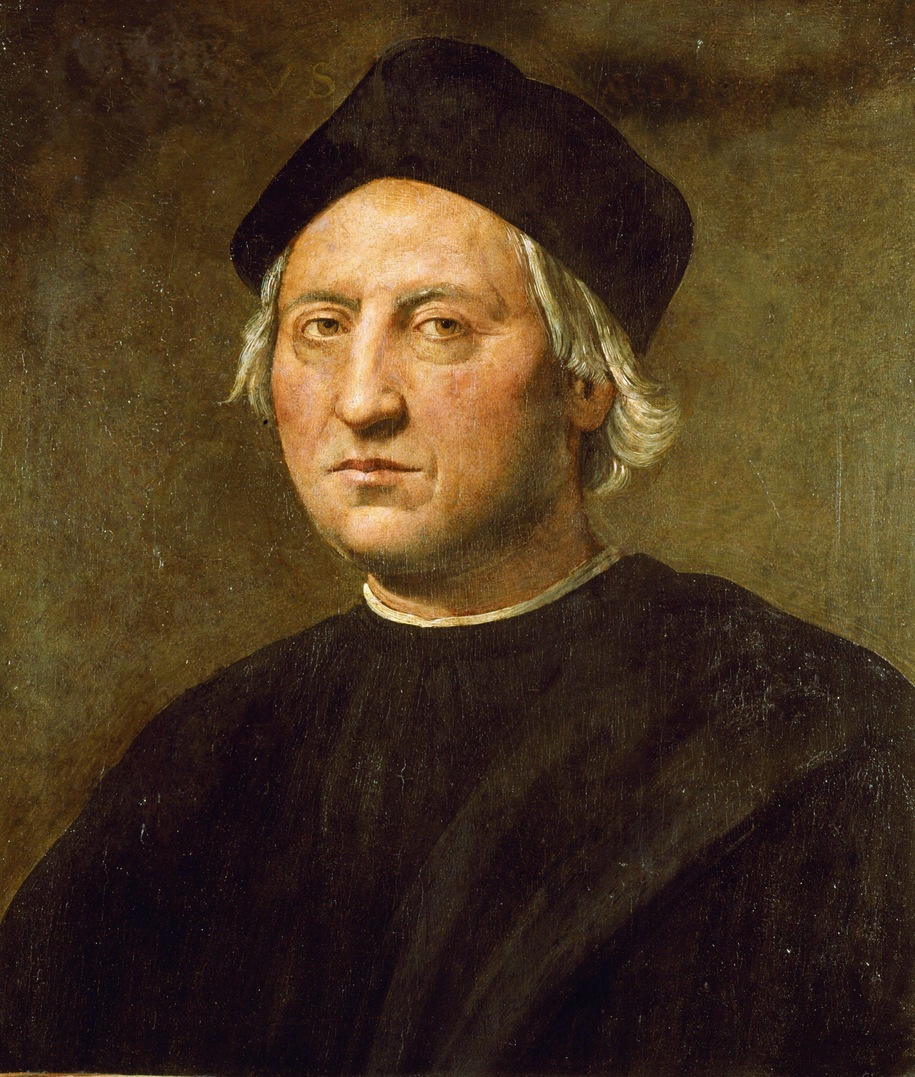
Christopher Columbus traveled to the Gulf of Honduras during his fourth voyage in 1502.

Spain soon sent expeditions to Guatemala and Honduras, and the conquest of Yucatán began in 1527. Though the Maya offered stiff resistance to Spanish "pacification", diseases contracted from the Spanish devastated the indigenous population and weakened its ability to resist conquest. In the 17th century, Spanish missionaries established churches in Maya settlements.

Piracy along the coast increased during this period. In 1642, and again in 1648, pirates sacked Salamanca de Bacalar, the seat of Spanish government in southern Yucatán. The abandonment of Bacalar ended Spanish control over the Maya provinces of Chetumal and Dzuluinicob. Bacalar was not refounded until 1729.

Between 1638 and 1695, the Maya living in the area of Tipu enjoyed autonomy from Spanish rule. But in 1696, Spanish soldiers used Tipu as a base from which they pacified the area and supported missionary activities. In 1697 the Spanish conquered the Itzá, and in 1707, the Spanish forcibly resettled the inhabitants of Tipu to the area near Lake Petén Itzá. The political center of the Maya province of Dzuluinicob ceased to exist at the time that British colonists were becoming increasingly interested in settling the area.

=== Colonial rivalry between Spain and the United Kingdom ===
In the 16th and 17th centuries, Spain tried to maintain a monopoly on trade and colonization in its New World colonies, but northern European powers were increasingly attracted to the region by the potential for trade and settlement. These powers resorted to smuggling, piracy, and war in their efforts to challenge and then destroy Spain's monopoly. In the 17th century, the Dutch, English, and French encroached on Spain's New World possessions.

Early in the 17th century, in southeastern Mexico and on the Yucatán Peninsula, English buccaneers began cutting logwood (Haematoxylum campechianum), which was used in the production of a textile dye. English buccaneers began using the coastline as a base from which to attack Spanish ships. Buccaneers stopped plundering Spanish logwood ships and started cutting their own wood in the 1650s and 1660s. However, buccaneers did not found permanent settlements. A 1667 treaty, in which the European powers agreed to suppress piracy, encouraged the shift from buccaneering to cutting logwood.

The first permanent British settlement in what is now Belize was founded in the late 1710s on Cayo Cosina, following the destruction by the Spanish of earlier British logging settlements in the Laguna de Términos region west of the Yucatán. During the winter of 1717–1718 the notorious pirate Blackbeard, aka Edward Teach, harassed shipping sailing to and from the port of Vera Cruz, Mexico while sailing in the Bay of Honduras. In April 1718, at Turneffe Atoll, Blackbeard captured the sloop Adventure and forced its captain David Herriot to join him. Blackbeard then made Israel Hands captain of the Adventure and began sailing for North Carolina.

Conflict continued between Britain and Spain over the right of the British to cut logwood and to settle in the region. During the 18th century, the Spanish attacked the British settlers whenever the two powers were at war. The 1763 Treaty of Paris conceded to Britain the right to cut logwood but asserted Spanish sovereignty over the territory. When war broke out again in 1779, the British settlement was abandoned until the Treaty of Versailles in 1783 allowed the British to again cut logwood in the area. By that time, however, the logwood trade had declined and Honduras Mahogany (Swietenia macrophylla) had become the chief export.

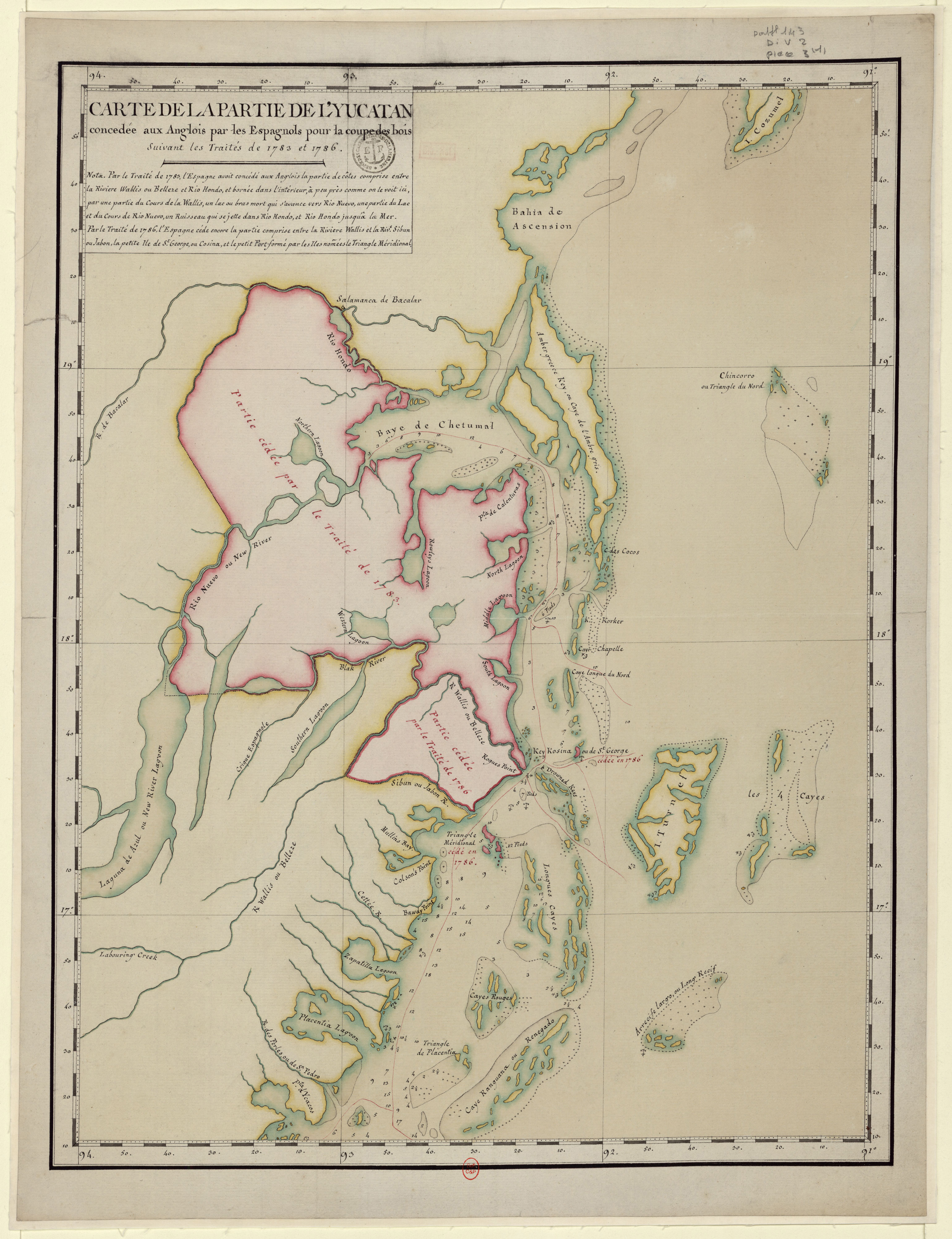
1790 map of territory conceded by Spain to British settlers for cutting timber.

The British were reluctant to set up any formal government for the settlement for fear of provoking the Spanish. On their own initiative, settlers had begun electing magistrates to establish common law as early as 1738. In 1765 these regulations were codified and expanded into Burnaby's Code. When the settlers began returning to the area in 1784, Colonel Edward Marcus Despard was named superintendent to oversee the Settlement of Belize in the Bay of Honduras. The 1786 Convention of London allowed the British settlers to cut and export timber but not to build fortifications, establish any form of government, or develop plantation agriculture. Spain retained sovereignty over the area.

The last Spanish attack on the British settlement, the Battle of St. George's Caye, occurred two years after the outbreak of war in 1796. The British drove off the Spanish, thwarting Spain's last attempt to control the territory or dislodge other settlers. Then the limits of the settlement were extended over a hundred miles southward to the Sarstoon River.

Despite treaties banning local government and plantation agriculture, both activities flourished. In the late 18th century, an oligarchy of relatively wealthy settlers controlled the political economy of the British settlement. These settlers claimed about four-fifths of the available land; owned about half of all slaves; controlled imports, exports, and the wholesale and retail trades; and determined taxation. A group of magistrates, whom they elected from among themselves, had executive as well as judicial functions. The landowners resisted any challenge to their growing political power.

The situation changed when the Spanish territories around Belize became the new independent states of Mexico and the Federal Republic of Central America. In 1825 Mexico was officially recognized by Britain and in 1826 abandoned any claims over Belize. Shortly thereafter, the créole elite of Belize invented a legend to support an alleged British past: a Scottish buccaneer called Peter Wallace would have settled in the region as early as 1638 and given his name to the Belize River.

=== Slavery in the settlement (1794–1838) ===
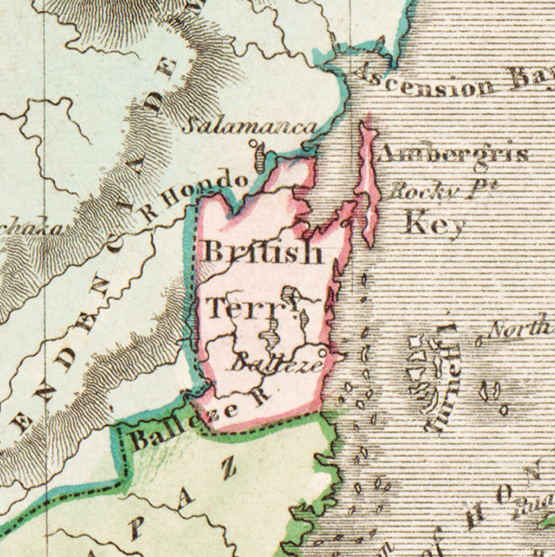
1831 map of Belize by Daniel Lizars

The earliest reference to African slaves in the British settlement appeared in a 1724 Spanish missionary's account, which stated that the British recently had been importing them from Jamaica, Bermuda, and other Central American British Colonies. A century later, the total slave population numbered about 2,300. Most slaves were born in Africa, and many slaves at first maintained African ethnic identifications and cultural practices. Gradually, however, slaves assimilated and a new, synthetic Kriol culture was formed.

Slavery in the settlement was associated with the extraction of timber, because treaties forbade the production of plantation crops. Settlers needed only one or two slaves to cut logwood, but as the trade shifted to mahogany in the last quarter of the 18th century, the settlers needed more money, land, and slaves for larger-scale operations. Other slaves worked as domestic helpers, sailors, blacksmiths, nurses, and bakers. The slaves' experience, though different from that on plantations in other colonies in the region, was nevertheless oppressive. They were frequently the objects of "extreme inhumanity", as a report published in 1820 stated. In the 18th century, many slaves escaped to Yucatán, and in the early 19th century a steady flow of runaways went to Guatemala and down the coast to Honduras.

One way the settler minority maintained its control was by dividing the slaves from the growing population of free Kriol people who were given limited privileges. Though some Kriols were legally free, their economic activities and voting rights were restricted. Privileges, however, led many free blacks to stress their loyalty and acculturation to British ways.

The act to abolish slavery throughout the British colonies, passed in 1833, was intended to avoid drastic social changes by effecting emancipation over a five-year transition period, by implementing a system of "apprenticeship" calculated to extend masters' control over the former slaves, and by compensating former slave owners for their loss of property. After 1838, the masters of the settlement continued to control the country for over a century by denying access to land and by limiting freedmen's economic freedom.

=== Emigration of the Garifuna ===
At the same time that the settlement was grappling with the ramifications of the end of slavery, a new ethnic group—the Garifuna—appeared. In the early 19th century, the Garifuna, descendants of Caribs of the Lesser Antilles and of Africans who had escaped from slavery, arrived in the settlement. The Garifuna had resisted British and French colonialism in the Lesser Antilles until they were defeated by the British in 1796. After putting down a violent Garifuna rebellion on Saint Vincent, the British moved between 1,700 and 5,000 of the Garifuna across the Caribbean to the Bay Islands (present-day Islas de la Bahía) off the north coast of Honduras. From there they migrated to the Caribbean coasts of Nicaragua, Honduras, Guatemala, and the southern part of present-day Belize. By 1802 about 150 Garifuna had settled in the Stann Creek (present-day Dangriga) area and were engaged in fishing and farming.

Other Garifuna later came to the British settlement of Belize after finding themselves on the wrong side in a civil war in Honduras in 1832. Many Garifuna men soon found wage work alongside slaves as mahogany cutters. In 1841 Dangriga, the Garifuna's largest settlement, was a flourishing village. The American traveler John Stephens described the Garifuna village of Punta Gorda as having 500 inhabitants and producing a wide variety of fruits and vegetables.

The British treated Garifuna as squatters. In 1857 the British told the Garifuna that they must obtain leases from the crown or risk losing their lands, dwellings, and other buildings. The 1872 Crown Lands Ordinance established reservations for the Garifuna as well as the Maya. The British prevented both groups from owning land and treated them as a source of valuable labor.

=== Constitutional developments (1850–62) ===
In the 1850s, the power struggle between the superintendent and the planters coincided with events in international diplomacy to produce major constitutional changes. In the Clayton–Bulwer Treaty of 1850, Britain and the United States agreed to promote the construction of a canal across Central America and to refrain from colonizing any part of Central America. The British government interpreted the colonization clause as applying only to any future occupation. But the United States government claimed that Britain was obliged to evacuate the area, particularly after 1853, when President Franklin Pierce's expansionist administration stressed the Monroe Doctrine. Britain yielded on the Bay Islands and the Mosquito Coast in eastern Nicaragua. But in 1854, Britain produced a formal constitution establishing a legislative for its possession of the settlement in present-day Belize.

The Legislative Assembly of 1854 was to have eighteen elected members, each of whom was to have at least £400 sterling worth of property. The assembly was also to have three official members appointed by the superintendent. The fact that voters had to have property yielding an income of £7 a year or a salary of a £100 a year reinforced the restrictive nature of this legislature. The superintendent could defer or dissolve the assembly at any time, originate legislation, and give or withhold consent to bills. This situation suggested that the legislature was more a chamber of debate than a place where decisions were made. The Colonial Office in London became, therefore, the real political-administrative power in the settlement. This shift in power was reinforced when in 1862, the Settlement of Belize in the Bay of Honduras was declared a British colony called British Honduras, and the crown's representative was elevated to a lieutenant governor, subordinate to the governor of Jamaica.

Under the Clayton–Bulwer Treaty of 1850 between the United States and Britain, neither country was to undertake any control, colonization or occupation of any part of Central America, but it was unclear if it applied to Belize. In 1853, a new American government attempted to have Britain leave Belize. In 1856 the Dallas-Clarendon Treaty between the two governments recognized Belize territory as British. The Sarstoon River was recognized as the southern border with Guatemala. The Anglo-Guatemalan Treaty of 1859 was signed, setting the present-day western boundary and temporarily settling the question of Guatemala's claim on the territory. Only the northern border with Mexico was undefined.

== British Honduras (1862–1981) ==
=== Maya immigration and conflict ===
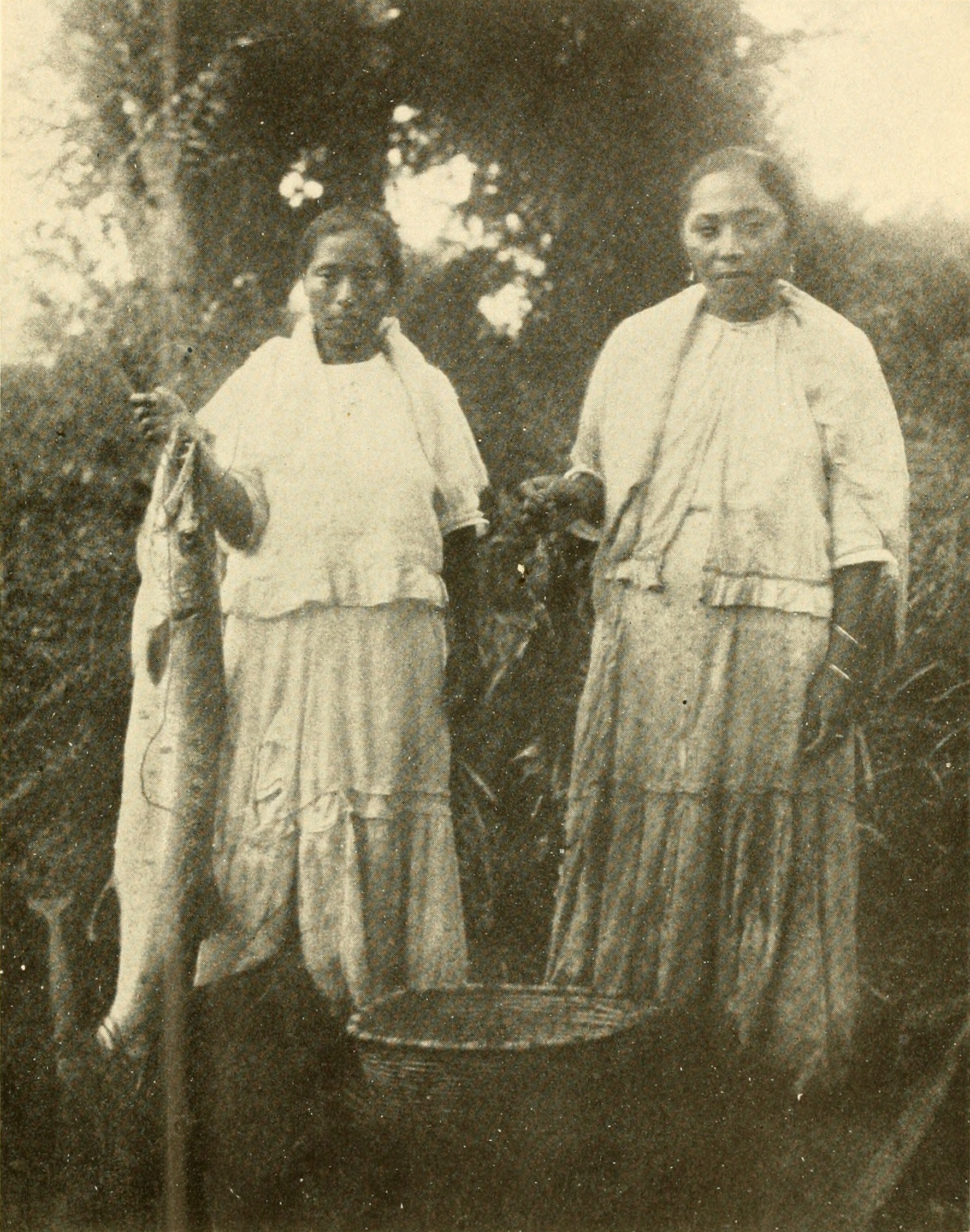
Maya fisherwomen in British Honduras, beginning of the 20th century.

As the British consolidated their settlement and pushed deeper into the interior in search of mahogany in the late 18th century, they encountered resistance from the Maya. In the second half of the 19th century, however, a combination of events outside and inside the colony redefined the position of the Maya. During the Caste War in Yucatán, a devastating struggle that halved the population of the area between 1847 and 1855, thousands of refugees fled to the British settlement. Though the Maya were not allowed to own land, most of the refugees were small farmers who were growing considerable quantities of crops by the mid-19th century.

One group of Maya led by Marcos Canul attacked a mahogany camp on the Bravo River in 1866. A detachment of British troops sent to San Pedro was defeated by the Maya later that year. Early in 1867 British troops marched into areas in which the Maya had settled and destroyed villages in an attempt to drive them out. The Maya returned and in April 1870 Canul and his men occupied Corozal. An unsuccessful 1872 attack by the Maya on Orange Walk was the last serious attack on the British colony.

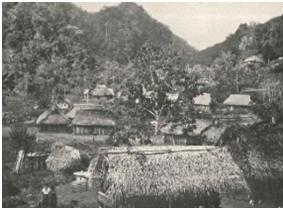
Sarstoon Kekchi Mayan village

In the 1880s and 1890s, Mopan and Kekchí Maya fled from forced labor in Guatemala and settled in several villages in southern British Honduras. Under the policy of indirect rule, a system of elected alcaldes (mayors) linked these Maya to the colonial administration. However, the remoteness of their settlements resulted in the Mopan and Kekchí Maya becoming less assimilated into the colony than the Maya of the north, where a Mestizo culture emerged. By the end of the 19th century, the ethnic pattern that remained largely intact throughout the 20th century was in place: Protestants largely of African descent, who spoke either English or Creole and lived in Belize Town; the Roman Catholic Maya and Mestizos who spoke Spanish and lived chiefly in the north and west; and the Roman Catholic Garifuna who spoke English, Spanish, or Garifuna and settled on the southern coast.

=== Formal establishment of the colony (1862–71) ===
The flag of British Honduras.

Largely as a result of the costly military expeditions against the Maya, the expenses of administering the new colony of British Honduras increased, at a time when the economy was severely depressed. Great landowners and merchants dominated the Legislative Assembly, which controlled the colony's revenues and expenditures. Some of the landowners were also involved in commerce but their interest differed from the other merchants of Belize Town. The former group resisted the taxation of land and favored an increase in import duties; the latter preferred the opposite.

Moreover, the merchants in the town felt relatively secure from Maya attacks and were unwilling to contribute toward the protection of mahogany camps, whereas the landowners felt that they should not be required to pay taxes on lands given inadequate protection. These conflicting interests produced a stalemate in the Legislative Assembly, which failed to authorize the raising of sufficient revenue. Unable to agree among themselves, the members of the Legislative Assembly surrendered their political privileges and asked for establishment of direct British rule in return for the greater security of crown colony status. The new constitution was inaugurated in April 1871 and the new legislature became the Legislative Council.

Since 1854, the richest inhabitants elected an Assembly of notables by censal vote, which was replaced in 1962 by a Legislative Council appointed by the British monarchy.

Under the new constitution of 1871, the lieutenant governor and the Legislative Council, consisting of five ex officio or "official" and four appointed or "unofficial" members, governed British Honduras. This constitutional change confirmed and completed a change in the locus and form of power in the colony's political economy that had been evolving during the preceding half century. The change moved power from the old settler oligarchy to the boardrooms of British companies and to the Colonial Office in London.

=== The colonial order (1871–1931) ===
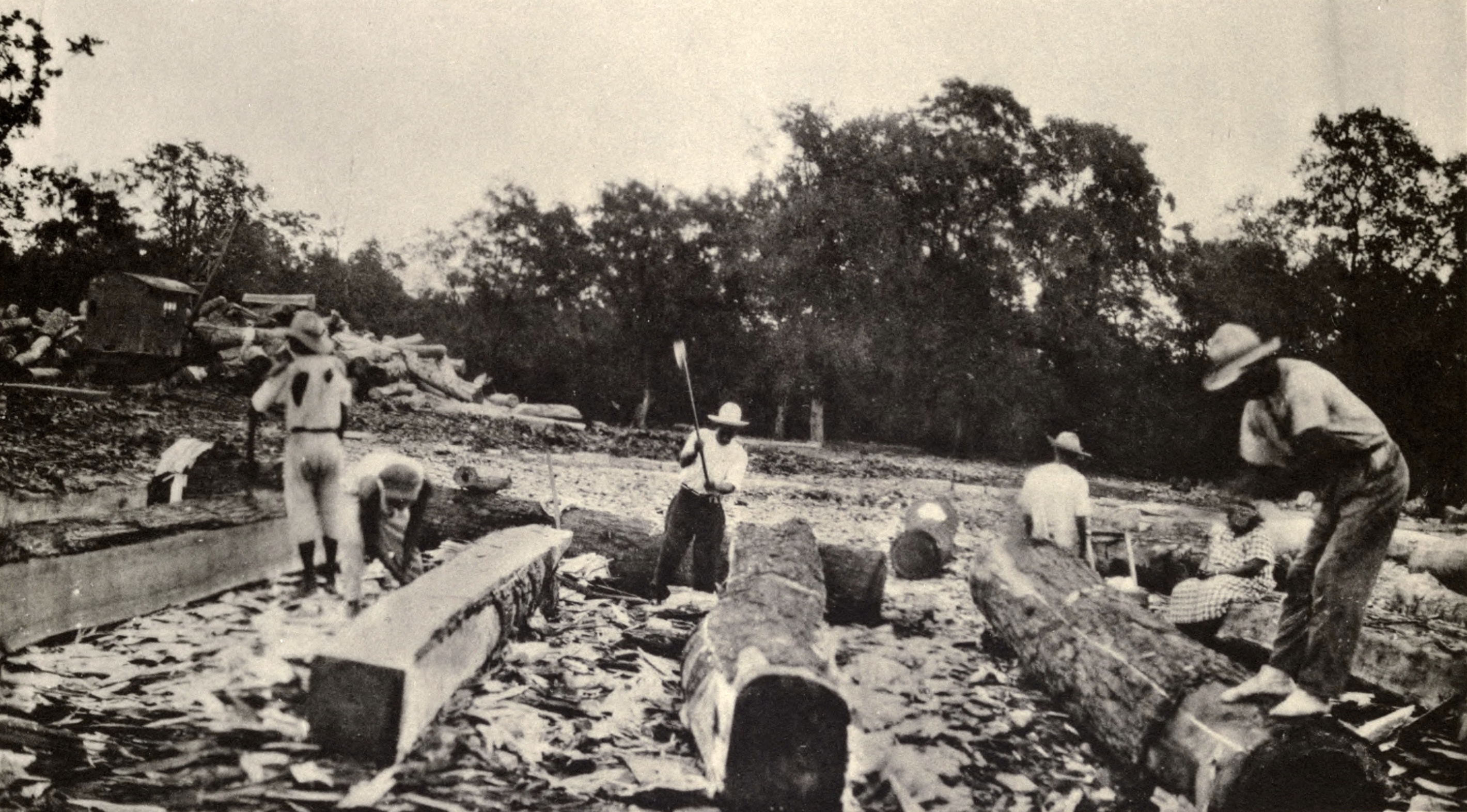
Men working in the mahogany industry, around 1930.

The forestry industry's control of land and its influence in colonial decision-making slowed the development of agriculture and the diversification of the economy. Though British Honduras had vast areas of sparsely populated, unused land, landownership was controlled by a small European monopoly, thwarting the evolution of a Creole landowning class from the former slaves. There were some exceptions however, most notably, Isaiah Emmanuel Morter, who was the son of former slaves and accumulated a large landholdings of banana and coconut plantations.

Landownership became even more consolidated during the economic depression of the mid-19th century. Major results of this depression included the decline of the old settler class, the increasing consolidation of capital, and the intensification of British landownership. The British Honduras Company (later the Belize Estate and Produce Company) emerged as the predominant landowner, with about half of all the privately held land in the colony. The new company was the chief force in British Honduras's political economy for over a century.

This concentration and centralization of capital meant that the direction of the colony's economy was henceforth determined largely in London. It also signaled the eclipse of the old settler elite. By about 1890, most commerce in British Honduras was in the hands of a clique of Scottish and German merchants, most of them newcomers. The European minority exercised great influence in the colony's politics, partly because it was guaranteed representation on the wholly appointed Legislative Council. In 1892, the governor appointed several Creole members, but whites remained the majority.

Despite the prevailing stagnation of the colony's economy and society during most of the century prior to the 1930s, seeds of change were being sown. The mahogany trade remained depressed, and efforts to develop plantation agriculture failed. A brief revival in the forestry industry took place early in the 20th century as new demands for forest products came from the United States. Exports of chicle, a gum taken from the sapodilla tree and used to make chewing gum, propped up the economy from the 1880s. A short-lived boom in the mahogany trade occurred around 1900 in response to growing demand for the wood in the United States, but the ruthless exploitation of the forests without any conservation or reforestation depleted resources.

Creoles, who were well-connected with businesses in the United States, challenged the traditional political-economic connection with Britain as trade with the United States intensified. In 1927, Creole merchants and professionals replaced the representatives of British landowners (except for the manager of the Belize Estate and Produce Company) on the Legislative Council. The participation of this Creole elite in the political process was evidence of emerging social changes that were largely concealed by economic stagnation.

An agreement between Mexico and Britain in 1893 set the boundary along the Rio Hondo, though the treaty was not finalized until 1897.

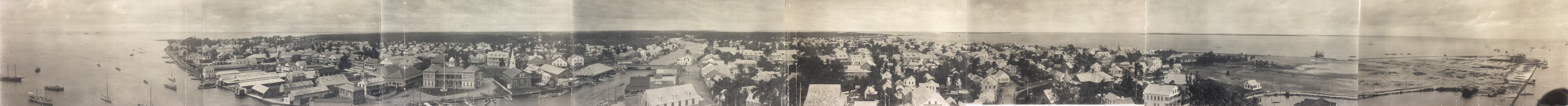
Panoramic view of Belize City, c. 1914

=== Genesis of modern politics, 1931–54 ===
The Great Depression shattered the colony's economy, and unemployment increased rapidly. On top of this economic disaster, the worst hurricane in the country's recent history demolished Belize Town on 10 September 1931, killing more than 1,000 people. The British relief response was tardy and inadequate. The British government seized the opportunity to impose tighter control on the colony and endowed the governor with the power to enact laws in emergency situations. The Belize Estate and Produce Company survived the depression years because of its special connections in British Honduras and London.

Meanwhile, workers in mahogany camps were treated almost like slaves. The law governing labor contracts, the Masters and Servants Act of 1883, made it a criminal offense for a laborer to breach a contract. In 1931 the governor, Sir John Burdon, rejected proposals to legalize trade unions and to introduce a minimum wage and sickness insurance. The poor responded in 1934 with a series of demonstrations, strikes, petitions, and riots that marked the beginning of modern politics and the independence movement. Riots, strikes, and rebellions had occurred before, but the events of the 1930s were modern labor disturbances in the sense that they gave rise to organizations with articulate industrial and political goals. Antonio Soberanis Gómez and his colleagues of the Labourers and Unemployed Association (LUA) attacked the governor and his officials, the rich merchants, and the Belize Estate and Produce Company, couching their demands in broad moral and political terms that began to define and develop a new nationalistic and democratic political culture.

The labor agitation's most immediate success was the creation of relief work by a governor who saw it as a way to avoid civil disturbances. The movement's greatest achievements, however, were the labor reforms passed between 1941 and 1943. Trade unions were legalized in 1941, and a 1943 law removed breach-of-labor-contract from the criminal code. The General Workers' Union (GWU), registered in 1943, quickly expanded into a nationwide organization and provided crucial support for The Nationalist Movement (Belize) that took off with the formation of the People's United Party (PUP) in 1950.

The 1930s were therefore the crucible of modern Belizean politics. It was a decade during which the old phenomena of exploitative labor conditions and authoritarian colonial and industrial relations began to give way to new labor and political processes and institutions. The same period saw an expansion in voter eligibility. In 1945 only 822 voters were registered in a population of over 63,000, but by 1954 British Honduras achieved suffrage for all literate adults. The introduction of credit unions and cooperatives after 1942, following the pioneering work of Fr. Marion M. Ganey S.J., would gradually increase the economic and political power of the Maya and of the less affluent people in the country.

In December 1949, the governor devalued the British Honduras dollar in defiance of the Legislative Council, an act that precipitated Belize's independence movement. The governor's action angered the nationalists because it reflected the limits of the legislature and revealed the extent of the colonial administration's power. The devaluation enraged labor because it protected the interests of the big transnationals while subjecting the working class to higher prices for goods. Devaluation thus united labor, nationalists, and the Creole middle classes in opposition to the colonial administration. On the night that the governor declared the devaluation, the People's Committee was formed and the nascent independence movement suddenly matured.

Between 1950 and 1954, the PUP, formed upon the dissolution of the People's Committee on 29 September 1950, consolidated its organization, established its popular base, and articulated its primary demands. By January 1950, the GWU and the People's Committee were holding joint public meetings and discussing issues such as devaluation, labor legislation, the proposed West Indies Federation, and constitutional reform. As political leaders took control of the union in the 1950s to use its strength, however, the union movement declined.

The PUP concentrated on agitating for constitutional reforms, including universal adult suffrage without a literacy test, an all- elected Legislative Council, an Executive Council chosen by the leader of the majority party in the legislature, the introduction of a ministerial system, and the abolition of the governor's reserve powers. In short, PUP pushed for representative and responsible government. The colonial administration, alarmed by the growing support for the PUP, retaliated by attacking two of the party's chief public platforms, the Belize City Council and the PUP. In 1952 he comfortably topped the polls in Belize City Council elections. Within just two years, despite persecution and division, the PUP had become a powerful political force, and George Price had clearly become the party's leader.

The colonial administration and the National Party, which consisted of loyalist members of the Legislative Council, portrayed the PUP as pro-Guatemalan and even communist. The leaders of the PUP, however, perceived British Honduras as belonging to neither Britain nor Guatemala. The governor and the National Party failed in their attempts to discredit the PUP on the issue of its contacts with Guatemala, which was then ruled by the democratic, reformist government of President Jacobo Arbenz. When voters went to the polls on 28 April 1954, in the first election under universal literate adult suffrage, the main issue was clearly colonialism—a vote for the PUP was a vote in favor of self-government. Almost 70 percent of the electorate voted. The PUP gained 66.3 percent of the vote and won eight of the nine elected seats in the new Legislative Assembly. Further constitutional reform was unequivocally on the agenda.

=== Decolonization and the border dispute with Guatemala ===
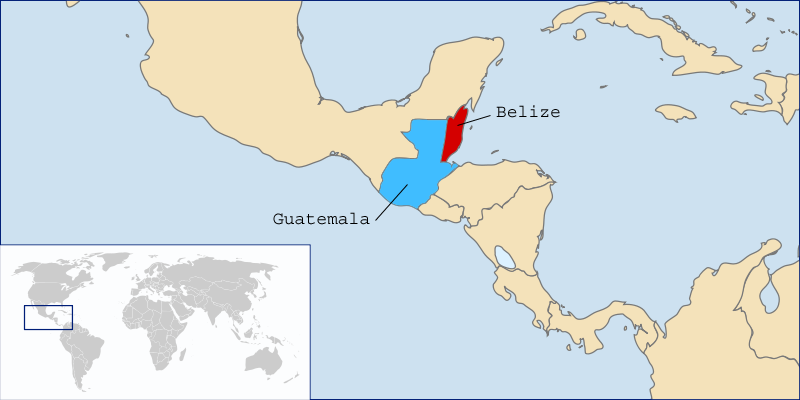
Belize (red) and Guatemala (blue).

British Honduras faced two obstacles to independence: British reluctance until the early 1960s to allow citizens to govern themselves, and Guatemala's long-standing claim to the entire territory. Guatemala had repeatedly threatened to use force to take over British Honduras. By 1961, Britain was willing to let the colony become independent. Negotiations between Britain and Guatemala began again in 1961, but the elected representatives of British Honduras had no voice in these talks. George Price refused an invitation to make British Honduras an "associated state" of Guatemala, reiterating his goal of leading the colony to independence.

In 1963 Guatemala broke off talks and ended diplomatic relations with Britain. Talks between Guatemala and British Honduras started and stopped abruptly during the late 1960s and early 1970s. From 1964 Britain controlled only British Honduran defense, foreign affairs, internal security, and the terms and conditions of the public service, and in 1973 the colony's name was changed to Belize in anticipation of independence.

By 1975, the Belizean and British governments, frustrated at dealing with the military-dominated regimes in Guatemala, agreed on a new strategy that would take the case for self-determination to various international forums. The Belize government felt that by gaining international support, it could strengthen its position, weaken Guatemala's claims, and make it harder for Britain to make any concessions. Belize argued that Guatemala frustrated the country's legitimate aspirations to independence and that Guatemala was pushing an irrelevant claim and disguising its own colonial ambitions by trying to present the dispute as an effort to recover territory lost to a colonial power.

Between 1975 and 1981, Belizean leaders stated their case for self-determination at a meeting of the heads of Commonwealth of Nations governments, the conference of ministers of the Nonaligned Movement, and at meetings of the United Nations (UN). Latin American governments initially supported Guatemala. Between 1975 and 1979, however, Belize won the support of Cuba, Mexico, Panama, and Nicaragua. Finally, in November 1980, with Guatemala completely isolated, the UN passed a resolution that demanded the independence of Belize.

A last attempt was made to reach an agreement with Guatemala prior to the independence of Belize. The Belizean representatives to the talks made no concessions, and a proposal, called the Heads of Agreement, was initialed on 11 March 1981. However, when ultraright political forces in Guatemala labeled the proponents as sellouts, the Guatemalan government refused to ratify the agreement and withdrew from the negotiations. Meanwhile, the opposition in Belize engaged in violent demonstrations against the Heads of Agreement. A state of emergency was declared. However, the opposition could offer no real alternatives. With the prospect of independence celebrations in the offing, the opposition's morale fell. Independence came to Belize on 21 September 1981 after the Belize Act 1981, without reaching an agreement with Guatemala.

== Independence ==
The flag of Belize, originally adopted in 1922.

With Price at the helm, the PUP won all elections until 1984. In that election, first national election after independence, the PUP was defeated by the United Democratic Party (UDP), and UDP leader Manuel Esquivel replaced Price as prime minister. Price returned to power after elections in 1989. Guatemala's president formally recognized Belize's independence in 1992. The following year the United Kingdom announced that it would end its military involvement in Belize. All British soldiers were withdrawn in 1994, apart from a small contingent of troops who remained to train Belizean troops.

The UDP regained power in the 1993 national election, and Esquivel became prime minister for a second time. Soon afterward Esquivel announced the suspension of a pact reached with Guatemala during Price's tenure, claiming Price had made too many concessions in order to gain Guatemalan recognition. The pact would have resolved the 130-year-old border dispute between the two countries. Border tensions continued into the early 21st century, although the two countries cooperated in other areas.

The PUP won a landslide victory in the 1998 national elections, and PUP leader Said Musa was sworn in as prime minister. In the 2003 elections the PUP maintained its majority, and Musa continued as prime minister. He pledged to improve conditions in the underdeveloped and largely inaccessible southern part of Belize.

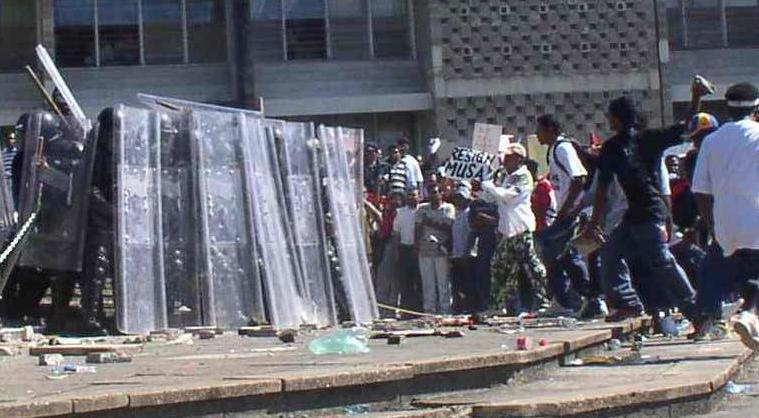
Riot police and protesters during the unrest in 2005.

In 2005, Belize was the site of the unrest caused by discontent with the People's United Party government, including tax increases in the national budget. On 8 February 2008, Dean Barrow of the United Democratic Party (UDP) was sworn in as Belize's first black prime minister.

Throughout Belize's history, Guatemala has claimed ownership of all or part of the territory. This claim is occasionally reflected in maps showing Belize as Guatemala's twenty-third province. As of March 2007, the border dispute with Guatemala remained unresolved and quite contentious; at various times the issue has required mediation by the United Kingdom, Caribbean Community heads of Government, the Organization of American States, and the United States. In December 2008, Belize and Guatemala signed an agreement to submit the territorial differences to the International Court of Justice, after referendums in both countries (which have not taken place as of March 2019). Notably, both Guatemala and Belize are participating in the confidence-building measures approved by the OAS, including the Guatemala-Belize Language Exchange Project.

Since independence, a British garrison (British Army Training and Support Unit Belize) has been retained in Belize at the request of the Belizean government.

Conservative United Democratic Party led Belize 12 years under Prime Minister Dean Barrow, until general election in November 2020 was won by the opposition centre-left PUP party. The leader of the People’s United Party (PUP) Johnny Briceño, a former deputy prime minister, became new Prime Minister of Belize on 13 November 2020.

== See also ==
- History of the British West Indies
- History of Central America
- History of the Caribbean
- Spanish colonization of the Americas
- Postage stamps and postal history of Belize
