= 2019–20 Premier League of Belize =

Premier League of Belize
- Season: 2019–20
- Dates: 27 July 2019 – 11 March 2020
- Champions: Opening: Verdes; Closing: Season cancelled
- CONCACAF League: Verdes
- Matches: 89
- Goals: 296 (3.33 per match)
- Top goalscorer: Opening: Mariano Landero (14); Closing: Georgie Welcome (8)
- Biggest home win: Belmopan Bandits 11-0 Placencia Assassins (11 January 2020)
- Biggest away win: Valley Pride Freedom Fighters 1-10 Verdes (6 October 2019)
- Highest scoring: Valley Pride Freedom Fighters 1-10 Verdes (6 October 2019); Belmopan Bandits 11-0 Placencia Assassins (11 January 2020)
- Longest winning run: San Pedro Pirates (4)
- Longest unbeaten run: Verdes (15)
- Longest winless run: Valley Pride Freedom Fighters (10)
- Longest losing run: Valley Pride Freedom Fighters (7)

The 2019–20 Premier League of Belize was the ninth season of the Premier League of Belize, the highest competitive football league in Belize, after it was founded in 2011. There were two seasons which were spread over two years.

== Teams ==
Team	City	Stadium	Manager	Captain
Altitude	Independence	Michael Ashcroft Stadium	(Belize) Hilberto Muschamp	(Belize) Jose Urbina
Belize Defence Force	Belize City	MCC Grounds	(Belize) Jerome Serano	(Belize) Osmar Duran
Belmopan Bandits	Belmopan	Isidoro Beaton Stadium	(Costa Rica) Leroy Sherrier Lewis	(Belize) Dalton Eiley
Placencia Assassins	Placencia	Placencia Football Field	(Belize) Robert Muschamp	(Belize) Ashley Torres
San Pedro Pirates	San Pedro	Ambergris Stadium	(Brazil) Jorge Nunez	(Belize) Jesse Smith
Valley Pride Freedom Fighters (Note: Valley Pride Freedom Fighters did not compete in the closing season.)	Dangriga	Carl Ramos Stadium	(Belize) Gerson Voss	(Belize) Jacinto Bermudez
Verdes	San Ignacio	Norman Broaster Stadium	(Peru) Cesar Martin Dall'Orso	(Belize) Woodrow West
Wagiya	Dangriga	Carl Ramos Stadium	(Belize) Francis Flores	

== Opening season ==
From the 2018–19 Premier League of Belize closing season, 7 teams continued to play in the opening season of 2019–20, with Placencia Assassins returning to the league to replace Police United. Freedom Fighters were also rebranded to Valley Pride Freedom Fighters and relocated to Dangriga from Punta Gorda.

There would be one league consisting of the 8 teams, who will play each other twice, with the top 4 teams advancing to the end of season playoffs. The opening season commenced on 27 July 2019.

=== League table ===
Pos	Team	Pld	W	D	L	GF	GA	GD	Pts	Qualification or relegation
1	Verdes	14	10	3	1	45	15	+30	33	Advance to Playoffs
2	Belmopan Bandits	14	8	4	2	35	13	+22	28	Advance to Playoffs
3	San Pedro Pirates	14	5	8	1	24	18	+6	23	Advance to Playoffs
4	Altitude	14	6	3	5	22	26	−4	21	Advance to Playoffs
5	Wagiya	14	5	4	5	22	16	+6	19	
6	Belize Defence Force	14	5	4	5	21	21	0	19	
7	Placencia Assassins	14	1	3	10	15	36	−21	6	
8	Valley Pride Freedom Fighters	14	1	1	12	14	53	−39	4	

Source: Soccerway
Rules for classification: 1) points; 2) goal difference; 3) number of goals scored.

=== Results ===
Home \ Away	ALT	BDF	BEL	PLA	SPE	VAL	VER	WAG
Altitude		2–0	2–2	3–1	0–0	4–2	0–1	1–0
Belize Defence Force	1–0		1–1	1–1	1–3	3–1	3–3	2–1
Belmopan Bandits	3–1	2–0		6–0	0–0	6–2	1–4	3–1
Placencia Assassins	2–3	0–1	0–1		2–3	3–1	2–3	1–4
San Pedro Pirates	1–1	3–3	0–2	0–0		3–0	2–1	2–2
Valley Pride Freedom Fighters	2–4	0–4	0–7	3–2	1–2		1–10	0–1
Verdes	5–1	2–1	0–0	7–1	3–3	3–0		2–0
Wagiya	6–0	2–0	2–1	0–0	2–2	1–1	0–1	

Source: Soccerway
Legend: Blue = home team win; Yellow = draw; Red = away team win.

=== Playoffs ===
Semifinals
1	Verdes	1	5	6
4	Altitude	1	3	4
2	Belmopan Bandits (a)	2	0	2
3	San Pedro Pirates	1	1	2

Finals
1	Verdes	1	2	3
2	Belmopan Bandits	1	0	1

==== Semifinals ====
Game One

23 November 2019	Altitude	1 – 1	Verdes	Michael Ashcroft Stadium, Independence
19:30	Andres Orozco 6'		Everal Trapp 90+3'

23 November 2019	San Pedro Pirates	1 – 2	Belmopan Bandits	Ambergris Stadium, San Pedro
19:30	Jesse Smith 84'		Roberto Silva de Lima 20'; Nahjib Guerra 58'

Game Two

30 November 2019	Belmopan Bandits	0 – 1 (2 – 2 (a) agg.)	San Pedro Pirates	Isidoro Beaton Stadium, Belmopan
20:00			Mailson Moura 83'

1 December 2019	Verdes	5 – 3 (6 – 4 agg.)	Altitude	Norman Broaster Stadium, San Ignacio
16:00	Elroy Smith 10' (pen.); Krisean Lopez 19', 77'; Trimayne Harris 47', 83'		Andres Orozco 4'; Everal Trapp 31' (o.g.); Elroy Coe 90+5'

==== Finals ====
Game One

8 December 2019	Belmopan Bandits	1 – 1	Verdes	Isidoro Beaton Stadium, Belmopan
19:00	Daniel Jimenez 45+1'		Krisean Lopez 35'	Referee: Ismael Cornejo (El Salvador)

Game Two

15 December 2019	Verdes	2 – 0 (3 – 1 agg.)	Belmopan Bandits	Norman Broaster Stadium, San Ignacio
15:30	Jeromy James 6'; Elroy Smith 89' (pen.)			Referee: Bryan Lopez Castellanos (Guatemala)

=== Season statistics ===
==== Top scorers ====
Rank	Player	Team	Goals^{*}
1	(Mexico) Mariano Landero	Verdes	14
2	(Colombia) Andres Orozco	Altitude	11
3	(Belize) Krisean Lopez	Verdes	9
4	(Brazil) Roberto Silva de Lima	Belmopan Bandits	8
5	(Argentina) Facundo Garnier	San Pedro Pirates	7
5	(Mexico) Edwin Villeda	Verdes	7
7	(Belize) Jesse August	Belize Defence Force	6
8	(Belize) Carlos Lino	Valley Pride Freedom Fighters	5
8	(Belize) Trimayne Harris	Verdes	5
8	(Colombia) Henry Vivas	San Pedro Pirates	5
8	(Honduras) Georgie Welcome	Belmopan Bandits	5
12	(Colombia) Anderson Cordoba	San Pedro Pirates	4
12	(Colombia) Miguel Garcia	Altitude	4
12	(Belize) Jaren Lambey	Belize Defence Force	4
12	(Belize) Camilo Sanchez	Belize Defence Force	4
12	(Belize) Ashton Torres	Placencia Assassins	4

^{*} Includes playoff goals.

==== Hat-tricks ====
Player	For	Against	Result	Date
(Mexico) Mariano Landero	Verdes	Altitude	5–1 (H)	15 September 2019
(Mexico) Mariano Landero	Verdes	Belize Defence Force	3–3 (A)	22 September 2019
(Belize) Carlos Gonzalez	Belmopan Bandits	Valley Pride Freedom Fighters	7–0 (A)	10 November 2019

=== Awards ===
At an awards ceremony on 4 January 2020, the individual awards were announced.

Award	Recipient	Team
Golden Boot	(Mexico) Mariano Landero	Verdes
MVP (Regular Season)	(Mexico) Edwin Villeda	Verdes
MVP (Playoff)	(Belize) Krisean Lopez	Verdes
Best Young Player	(Belize) Jesse August	Belize Defence Force
Best Midfielder	(Belize) Jordy Polanco	Verdes
Best Defender	(Belize) Elroy Smith	Verdes
Golden Glove	(Belize) Shane Orio	Belmopan Bandits
Best Coach	(Peru) Cesar Martin Dall'Orso	Verdes
Best Manager	(Belize) Lorin Frazer	Verdes

== Closing season ==
7 of the 8 teams that participated in the opening season will participate in the closing season, with Valley Pride Freedom Fighters not competing, as they were unable to meet their commitments.

The format will be the same as the opening season with one league consisting of the 7 teams, who will play each other twice, with the top 4 teams advancing to the end of season playoffs. The closing season commenced on 11 January 2020.

On 18 April 2020 a virtual meeting was held by the Premier League of Belize, and it was unanimously agreed by club owners to cancel the remainder of the closing season due to the uncertainty of the COVID-19 pandemic. The league also stated that the safety of players, officials, fans and stakeholders had to be taken into consideration. It was also agreed that Verdes would represent Belize at the 2020 CONCACAF League. According to the league, the decision to allow Verdes to represent Belize was based on the fact that the club had won the 2019–20 opening season, and was the aggregate point leader with a total of 51 points at the initial juncture, when the season was suspended.

=== League table ===
Pos	Team	Pld	W	D	L	GF	GA	GD	Pts	Qualification or relegation
1	Verdes	8	5	3	0	14	4	+10	18	Advance to Playoffs
2	Belmopan Bandits	7	4	1	2	26	4	+22	13	Advance to Playoffs
3	San Pedro Pirates	8	3	3	2	13	11	+2	12	Advance to Playoffs
4	Altitude	8	2	5	1	8	7	+1	11	Advance to Playoffs
5	Placencia Assassins	8	2	2	4	7	19	−12	8	
6	Wagiya	8	1	3	4	7	18	−11	6	
7	Belize Defence Force	7	1	1	5	6	18	−12	4	

Updated to match(es) played on 11 March 2020. Source: Soccerway
Rules for classification: 1) points; 2) goal difference; 3) number of goals scored.

=== Results ===
Home \ Away	ALT	BDF	BEL	PLA	SPE	VER	WAG
Altitude		1–1	–	–	2–2	0–0	2–2
Belize Defence Force	–		0–5	2–1	1–2	–	–
Belmopan Bandits	0–1	–		11–0	–	–	5–0
Placencia Assassins	0–1	3–0	0–3		–	1–1	–
San Pedro Pirates	1–1	–	3–2	1–2		–	2–0
Verdes	1–0	3–1	0–0	–	2–1		2–1
Wagiya	–	3–1	–	0–0	1–1	0–5	

Updated to match(es) played on 11 March 2020. Source: Soccerway
Legend: Blue = home team win; Yellow = draw; Red = away team win.

=== Season statistics ===
==== Top scorers ====
Rank	Player	Team	Goals^{*}
1	(Honduras) Georgie Welcome	Belmopan Bandits	8
2	(Argentina) Facundo Garnier	Belmopan Bandits	7
2	(Belize) Jesse Smith	San Pedro Pirates	7
4	(Belize) Krisean Lopez	Verdes	3

==== Hat-tricks ====
Player	For	Against	Result	Date
(Honduras) Georgie Welcome	Belmopan Bandits	Placencia Assassins	11–0 (H)	11 January 2020
(Argentina) Facundo Garnier	Belmopan Bandits	Wagiya	5–0 (H)	8 February 2020
