= 2018–19 Premier League of Belize =

Premier League of Belize
- Season: 2018–19
- Dates: 22 July 2018 – 18 May 2019
- Champions: Opening: Belmopan Bandits; Closing: San Pedro Pirates
- CONCACAF League: Belmopan Bandits
- Matches: 124
- Goals: 399 (3.22 per match)
- Top goalscorer: Opening: Georgie Welcome (17); Closing: Elroy Smith (11)
- Biggest home win: Verdes 7-0 Wagiya (29 July 2018)
- Biggest away win: Freedom Fighters 0-6 Police United (19 August 2018)
- Highest scoring: Freedom Fighters 4-5 Altitude (30 September 2018)
- Longest winning run: Verdes (6)
- Longest unbeaten run: Belmopan Bandits (12)
- Longest winless run: Belize Defence Force; Freedom Fighters; Police United; Wagiya (6)
- Longest losing run: Belize Defence Force; Freedom Fighters (6)

The 2018–19 Premier League of Belize was the eighth season of the Premier League of Belize, the highest competitive football league in Belize, after it was founded in 2011. There were two seasons which were spread over two years, the opening was played towards the end of 2018 and the closing was played at the beginning of 2019.

== Team information ==
Team	City	Stadium	Head coach	Captain
Altitude	Independence	Michael Ashcroft Stadium	(Belize) Wilmer Garcia	(Belize) Ashley Torres
Belize Defence Force	Belize City	MCC Grounds	(Belize) Charlie Slusher	(Belize) Blake Tejada
Belmopan Bandits	Belmopan	Isidoro Beaton Stadium	(Belize) Shane Orio	(Belize) Dalton Eiley
Freedom Fighters	Punta Gorda	Victor Sanchez Union Field	(Belize) Charles Gutierrez	(Belize) Evan Mariano
Police United	Belmopan	Isidoro Beaton Stadium	(Belize) Dale Pelayo Sr.	(Belize) Andres Makin Jr.
San Pedro Pirates	San Pedro	Ambergris Stadium	(Brazil) Jorge Nunez	(Belize) Jesse Smith
Verdes	San Ignacio; Santa Elena	Norman Broaster Stadium; Santa Elena Sporting Complex	(Belize) Marvin Ottley	(Belize) Elroy Smith
Wagiya	Dangriga	Carl Ramos Stadium	(Belize) Dennis Serano	(Belize) Erwin Middleton

== Opening Season ==
From the 2017–18 Premier League of Belize closing season, 7 teams continued to play in the opening season of 2018–19, with Altitude taking over the franchise of Placencia Assassins.

There would be one league consisting of the 8 teams, who will play each other twice, with the top 4 teams advancing to the end of season playoffs. The opening season commenced on 22 July 2018.

=== League table ===
Pos	Team	Pld	W	D	L	GF	GA	GD	Pts	Qualification or relegation
1	Belmopan Bandits	14	10	3	1	39	9	+30	33	Advance to Playoffs
2	Verdes	14	11	0	3	37	13	+24	33	Advance to Playoffs
3	San Pedro Pirates	14	7	1	6	24	18	+6	22	Advance to Playoffs
4	Police United	14	5	3	6	22	28	−6	18	Advance to Playoffs
5	Altitude	14	6	0	8	20	34	−14	18	
6	Freedom Fighters	14	4	2	8	30	43	−13	14	
7	Wagiya	14	4	1	9	20	35	−15	13	
8	Belize Defence Force	14	3	2	9	16	28	−12	11	

Source: Soccerway
Rules for classification: 1) points; 2) goal difference; 3) number of goals scored.

=== Results ===
Home \ Away	ALT	BDF	BEL	FRE	POL	SPE	VER	WAG
Altitude		2–1	0–3	3–2	2–3	0–4	1–2	2–1
Belize Defence Force	0–1		0–0	2–3	2–0	1–2	2–4	0–3
Belmopan Bandits	4–0	5–0		4–1	4–4	0–1	1–0	5–0
Freedom Fighters	4–5	2–2	2–5		0–6	3–4	3–0	3–1
Police United	2–1	1–3	0–3	2–2		1–0	0–5	1–1
San Pedro Pirates	6–1	0–1	0–0	1–3	0–1		1–2	2–1
Verdes	1–0	2–1	0–1	5–0	3–0	3–1		7–0
Wagiya	1–2	3–1	1–4	3–2	2–1	1–2	2–3	

Updated to match(es) played on 25 November 2018. Source: Soccerway
Legend: Blue = home team win; Yellow = draw; Red = away team win.

=== Playoffs ===
Semifinals
1	Belmopan Bandits	1	1	2
4	Police United	1	0	1
2	Verdes	4	1	5
3	San Pedro Pirates	1	2	3

Finals
1	Belmopan Bandits	4	1	5
2	Verdes	2	2	4

==== Semifinals ====
Game One

8 December 2018	San Pedro Pirates	1 – 4	Verdes	Ambergris Stadium, San Pedro
19:30	Eduardo Chavira 84'		Darwin Bermudez 4', 32'; Nahjib Guerra 21'; Elroy Kuylen 75'

9 December 2018	Police United	1 – 1	Belmopan Bandits	Isidoro Beaton Stadium, Belmopan
16:00	Carlton Thomas 61' (pen.)		Jeromy James 26'

Game Two

12 December 2018	Verdes	1 – 2 (5 – 3 agg.)	San Pedro Pirates	Norman Broaster Stadium, San Ignacio
19:30	Elroy Smith 57'		Eduardo Oliva 11'; Pablo Mendizabal 15'

13 December 2018	Belmopan Bandits	1 – 0 (2 – 1 agg.)	Police United	Isidoro Beaton Stadium, Belmopan
20:00	Jeromy James 90+3'

==== Finals ====
Game One

16 December 2018	Verdes	2 – 4	Belmopan Bandits	Norman Broaster Stadium, San Ignacio
16:00	Elroy Kuylen 45'; Nahjib Guerra 68'		Kevin Vicente 3'; Georgie Welcome 16', 64'; Trimayne Harris 73'	Referee: Wálter López Castellanos (Guatemala)

Game Two

22 December 2018	Belmopan Bandits	1 – 2 (5 – 4 agg.)	Verdes	Isidoro Beaton Stadium, Belmopan
20:00	Jeromy James 80'		Desmond Wade 22'; Trevor Lennen 35' (o.g.)	Referee: Mario Escobar Toca (Guatemala)

2018–19 Opening Season champions

9th title

=== Season Statistics ===
==== Top scorers ====
Rank	Player	Team	Goals^{*}
1	(Honduras) Georgie Welcome	Belmopan Bandits	17
2	(Mexico) Eduardo Chavira	San Pedro Pirates	12
2	(Belize) Alexander Peters	Freedom Fighters	12
4	(Belize) Nahjib Guerra	Verdes	9
5	(Belize) Jeromy James	Belmopan Bandits	7
5	(Belize) Krisean Lopez	Verdes	7
5	(Belize) Highking Roberts	Wagiya	7
8	(Belize) Jonard Castillo	Wagiya	6
8	(Belize) Trimayne Harris	Belmopan Bandits	6
8	(Belize) Jaren Lambey	Freedom Fighters	6
11	(Honduras) Darwin Bermudez	Verdes	4
11	(Belize) Jarret Davis	Verdes	4
11	(Belize) Evan Mariano	Freedom Fighters	4
11	(Argentina) Pablo Mendizabal	San Pedro Pirates	4
11	(Brazil) Roberto Silva de Lima	Verdes	4
11	(Belize) Carlton Thomas	Police United	4

^{*} Includes playoff goals.

==== Hat-tricks ====
Player	For	Against	Result	Date
(Belize) Nahjib Guerra	Verdes	Wagiya	7–0 (H)	29 July 2018
(Mexico) Eduardo Chavira^{4}	San Pedro Pirates	Altitude	4–0 (A)	19 August 2018
(Honduras) Georgie Welcome	Belmopan Bandits	Police United	3–0 (A)	26 August 2018
(Belize) Highking Roberts	Wagiya	Freedom Fighters	3–2 (H)	26 August 2018
(Honduras) Georgie Welcome	Belmopan Bandits	Freedom Fighters	5–2 (A)	2 September 2018
(Mexico) Eduardo Chavira	San Pedro Pirates	Altitude	6–1 (H)	20 October 2018
(Belize) Jeromy James	Belmopan Bandits	Wagiya	4–1 (A)	21 October 2018
(Honduras) Georgie Welcome	Belmopan Bandits	Freedom Fighters	4–1 (H)	3 November 2018

^{4} Player scored 4 goals

=== Awards ===
In the post-game ceremonies of the final game of the season, the individual awards were announced.

Award	Recipient	Team
Golden Boot	(Honduras) Georgie Welcome	Belmopan Bandits
MVP (Regular Season)	(Honduras) Georgie Welcome	Belmopan Bandits
MVP (Playoff)	(Belize) Jeromy James	Belmopan Bandits
Best Young Player	(Belize) Krisean Lopez	Verdes
Best Midfielder	(Honduras) Kevin Vicente	Belmopan Bandits
Best Defender	(Belize) Dalton Eiley	Belmopan Bandits
Golden Glove	(Belize) Shane Orio	Belmopan Bandits
Best Coach	(Belize) Kent Gabourel	Belmopan Bandits
Best Manager	(Belize) Emeliano Rivero	San Pedro Pirates

== Closing Season ==
All 8 teams that participated in the opening season will participate in the closing season.

The format will be the same as the opening season with one league consisting of the 8 teams, who will play each other twice, with the top 4 teams advancing to the end of season playoffs. The closing season commenced on 12 January 2019.

=== League table ===
Pos	Team	Pld	W	D	L	GF	GA	GD	Pts	Qualification or relegation
1	San Pedro Pirates	14	8	2	4	23	15	+8	26	Advance to Playoffs
2	Belmopan Bandits	14	7	4	3	25	15	+10	25	Advance to Playoffs
3	Verdes	14	6	6	2	19	9	+10	24	Advance to Playoffs
4	Belize Defence Force	14	6	4	4	19	15	+4	22	Advance to Playoffs
5	Police United	14	6	1	7	21	28	−7	19	
6	Altitude	14	5	2	7	18	21	−3	17	
7	Freedom Fighters	14	3	4	7	15	23	−8	13	
8	Wagiya	14	2	3	9	13	27	−14	9	

Source: Soccerway
Rules for classification: 1) points; 2) goal difference; 3) number of goals scored.

=== Results ===
Home \ Away	ALT	BDF	BEL	FRE	POL	SPE	VER	WAG
Altitude		2–2	1–3	0–1	2–1	0–1	1–3	4–1
Belize Defence Force	1–2		2–0	4–1	1–2	0–1	1–0	1–0
Belmopan Bandits	3–1	1–1		3–1	4–1	4–2	1–1	0–0
Freedom Fighters	0–1	0–0	1–2		3–1	1–1	0–0	5–3
Police United	1–0	2–2	1–3	3–1		1–2	1–2	3–2
San Pedro Pirates	2–1	1–2	2–1	3–1	0–1		1–1	4–1
Verdes	1–1	1–2	0–0	2–0	5–0	1–0		1–1
Wagiya	1–2	2–0	1–0	0–0	1–3	0–3	0–1	

Updated to match(es) played on 28 April 2019. Source: Soccerway
Legend: Blue = home team win; Yellow = draw; Red = away team win.

=== Playoffs ===
Semifinals
1	San Pedro Pirates	1	6	7
4	Belize Defence Force	0	1	1
2	Belmopan Bandits	4	0	4
3	Verdes	3	0	3

Finals
1	San Pedro Pirates	0	2	2
2	Belmopan Bandits	1	0	1

==== Semifinals ====
Game One

28 April 2019	Belize Defence Force	0 – 1	San Pedro Pirates	MCC Grounds, Belize City
16:00			Anderson Cordoba 85' (pen.)

28 April 2019	Verdes	3 – 4	Belmopan Bandits	FFB Stadium, Belmopan
16:00	Elroy Smith 22' (pen.), 89' (pen.); Elroy Kuylen 50'		Trimayne Harris 12'; Georgie Welcome 57' (pen.), 68', 71'

Game Two

4 May 2019	San Pedro Pirates	6 – 1 (7 – 1 agg.)	Belize Defence Force	Ambergris Stadium, San Pedro
19:30	Facundo Garnier 19', 61', 68', 71'; Jesse Smith 34'; Anderson Cordoba 74' (pen.)		Camilo Sanchez 51' (pen.)

4 May 2019	Belmopan Bandits	0 – 0 (4 – 3 agg.)	Verdes	Isidoro Beaton Stadium, Belmopan
20:00

==== Finals ====
Game One

11 May 2019	Belmopan Bandits	1 – 0	San Pedro Pirates	Isidoro Beaton Stadium, Belmopan
20:00	Humberto Requena 5'			Referee: Bryan Lopez Castellanos (GUA); Assistant referees: Marvin Diaz (GUA) & Ricardo Ake (BLZ); Fourth official: José Colindres (BLZ)

Game Two

18 May 2019	San Pedro Pirates	2 – 0 (2 – 1 agg.)	Belmopan Bandits	Ambergris Stadium, San Pedro
19:30	Facundo Garnier 67'; Mailson Moura 76'			Referee: Sergio Reyna (GUA); Assistant referees: Pablo Ramirez (GUA) & Ricardo Ake (BLZ); Fourth official: Elfren Guy (BLZ)

2018–19 Closing Season champions

1st title

=== Season Statistics ===
==== Top scorers ====
Rank	Player	Team	Goals^{*}
1	(Belize) Elroy Smith	Verdes	11
2	(Belize) Camilo Sánchez	Belize Defence Force	10
3	(Colombia) Andres Orozco	Altitude	9
3	(Belize) Highking Roberts	Wagiya	9
5	(Argentina) Facundo Garnier	San Pedro Pirates	8
6	(Belize) Trimayne Harris	Belmopan Bandits	7
6	(Honduras) Georgie Welcome	Belmopan Bandits	7
8	(Belize) Jaren Lambey	Freedom Fighters	5
8	(Belize) Harrison Roches	Police United	5
10	(Colombia) Anderson Cordoba	San Pedro Pirates	4
10	(Honduras) Jerry Palacios	Belmopan Bandits	4
10	(Belize) Carlton Thomas	Police United	4
10	(Belize) Luis Valdez	San Pedro Pirates	4

^{*} Includes playoff goals.

==== Hat-tricks ====
Player	For	Against	Result	Date
(Belize) Trimayne Harris	Belmopan Bandits	Altitude	3–1 (A)	19 January 2019
(Belize) Camilo Sanchez	Belize Defence Force	Freedom Fighters	4–1 (H)	7 April 2019
(Belize) Highking Roberts	Wagiya	Freedom Fighters	3–5 (A)	14 April 2019
(Honduras) Georgie Welcome	Belmopan Bandits	Verdes	4–3 (A)	28 April 2019
(Argentina) Facundo Garnier^{4}	San Pedro Pirates	Belize Defence Force	6–1 (H)	4 May 2019

^{4} Player scored 4 goals

=== Awards ===
In the post-game ceremonies of the final game of the season, the individual awards were announced.

Award	Recipient	Team
Golden Boot (Regular Season)	(Colombia) Andres Orozco	Altitude
Golden Boot (Regular Season)	(Belize) Highking Roberts	Wagiya
Golden Boot (Regular Season)	(Belize) Camilo Sanchez	Belize Defence Force
Golden Boot (Regular Season)	(Belize) Elroy Smith	Verdes
Golden Boot (Overall)	(Belize) Elroy Smith	Verdes
MVP (Regular Season)	(Honduras) Georgie Welcome	Belmopan Bandits
MVP (Playoff)	(Argentina) Facundo Garnier	San Pedro Pirates
Best Young Player	(Belize) Warren Moss	Wagiya
Best Midfielder	(Belize) Jesse Smith	San Pedro Pirates
Best Defender	(Belize) Dalton Eiley	Belmopan Bandits
Golden Glove	(Mexico) Rodrigo Vasquez	Verdes
Best Coach	(Brazil) Jorge Nunez	San Pedro Pirates
Best Manager	(Belize) Tony Maldonado	San Pedro Pirates

== Aggregate table ==
Pos	Team	Pld	W	D	L	GF	GA	GD	Pts	Qualification or relegation
1	Belmopan Bandits (Q)	28	17	7	4	64	24	+40	58	CONCACAF League preliminary round (Note: As champions with better aggregate record (BLZ1))
2	Verdes	28	17	6	5	56	22	+34	57	
3	San Pedro Pirates	28	15	3	10	47	33	+14	48	
4	Police United	28	11	4	13	43	56	−13	37	
5	Altitude	28	11	2	15	38	55	−17	35	
6	Belize Defence Force	28	9	6	13	35	43	−8	33	
7	Freedom Fighters	28	7	6	15	45	66	−21	27	
8	Wagiya	28	6	4	18	33	62	−29	22	

Source: Soccerway Soccerway
Rules for classification: 1) points; 2) goal difference; 3) number of goals scored.
(Q) Qualified for the phase indicated

== List of foreign players in the league ==
This is a list of foreign players in the 2018–19 season. The following players:

1. Have played at least one game for the respective club.
2. Have not been capped for the Belize national football team on any level, independently from the birthplace.

Each team can have a maximum of five foreign players in their roster.

Altitude
- (Colombia) Miguel Garcia
- (Colombia) Andres Orozco
- (Honduras) Darwin Sarmiento
- (Colombia) Ronaldo Vergara

Belize Defence Force
- (Honduras) Jose Tinoco

Belmopan Bandits
- (Honduras) Rony Flores
- (Mexico) Inri Gonzaga
- (Honduras) Jeffrie James
- (Mexico) Hector Martinez
- (Honduras) Jerry Palacios
- (Nigeria) Rilwan Salawu
- (Honduras) Kevin Vicente
- (Honduras) Georgie Welcome

Police United
- (Ghana) Jehoshaphat Nnadi

San Pedro Pirates
- (Mexico) Eduardo Chavira
- (Argentina) Facundo Garnier
- (Argentina) Pablo Mendizabal
- (Brazil) Mailson Moura
- (Colombia) Anderson Cordoba
- (Colombia) Carlos Pertuz
- (Honduras) Selvin Zeron Sagastume

Verdes
- (Honduras) Darwin Bermudez
- (Honduras) Dilmer Castillo
- (Honduras) Edlin Gutierrez
- (Timor-Leste) Alan Leandro
- (Honduras) Selvin Zeron Sagastume
- (Brazil) Roberto Silva de Lima
- (Brazil) Yoras Silva
- (Mexico) Rodrigo Vasquez
- (Mexico) Edwin Villeda

Wagiya
- (Nicaragua) Cristhian Cruz

(player released during the Opening season) (player released between the Opening and Closing seasons) (player released during the Closing season)
