= 2015–16 Premier League of Belize =

Belize football league

Premier League of Belize
- Season: 2015–16
- Dates: 15 August 2015 – 30 April 2016
- Champions: Opening: Police United; Closing: Belmopan Bandits
- Champions League: Police United
- Matches: 72
- Goals: 211 (2.93 per match)
- Top goalscorer: Opening: Deon McCaulay (10); Closing: Devon Makin (6)
- Biggest home win: Police United 7–0 Wagiya (8 November 2015)
- Biggest away win: Wagiya 0–4 Belmopan Bandits (31 October 2015)
- Highest scoring: Placencia Assassins 5–2 Wagiya (3 October 2015); Belize Defence Force 3–4 Belmopan Bandits (21 October 2015); Police United 7–0 Wagiya (8 November 2015); Police United 4–3 Placencia Assassins (14 February 2016)
- Longest winning run: Belize Defence Force; Belmopan Bandits; Police United (3)
- Longest unbeaten run: Police United (8)
- Longest winless run: Wagiya (13)
- Longest losing run: Wagiya (11)

The 2015–16 Premier League of Belize (also known as The Belikin Cup) was the fifth season of the highest competitive football league in Belize, after it was founded in 2011. There were two seasons which were spread over two years, the opening was played towards the end of 2015 and the closing was played at the beginning of 2016.

== Team information ==
Team	City	Stadium
Belize Defence Force	Belize City	MCC Grounds
Belmopan Bandits	Belmopan	FFB Stadium
Placencia Assassins	Independence	Michael Ashcroft Stadium
Police United	San Ignacio	Norman Broaster Stadium
Verdes	San Ignacio	Norman Broaster Stadium
Wagiya	Independence	Michael Ashcroft Stadium

== Opening season ==
From the 2014–15 Premier League of Belize season, 6 out of the 9 teams continued to play in the opening season of 2015–16. FC Belize, King Energy/Freedom Fighters and San Ignacio United were the absentees.

There would be one league consisting of the 6 teams, who will play each other twice, with the top 4 teams advancing to the end of season playoffs. The opening season commenced on 15 August 2015.

=== League table ===
Pos	Team	Pld	W	D	L	GF	GA	GD	Pts	Qualification
1	Belmopan Bandits (Q)	10	6	3	1	22	11	+11	21	Qualification to the Playoffs
2	Police United (Q)	10	5	4	1	18	5	+13	19	Qualification to the Playoffs
3	Placencia Assassins (Q)	10	5	3	2	20	13	+7	18	Qualification to the Playoffs
4	Verdes (Q)	10	2	5	3	13	14	−1	11	Qualification to the Playoffs
5	Belize Defence Force	10	2	2	6	16	21	−5	8	
6	Wagiya	10	1	1	8	12	37	−25	4	

Source: Soccerway
Rules for classification: 1) points; 2) goal difference; 3) number of goals scored.
(Q) Qualified for the phase indicated

=== Results ===
==== Round 1 ====
15 August 2015
19:30

Verdes	1 – 1	Placencia Assassins
Yoras Silva 31'		Kareem Haylock 76'

Norman Broaster Stadium, San Ignacio

15 August 2015
19:30

Wagiya	5 – 1	Belize Defence Force
Jacinto Bermudez 8'; Eugene Martinez 45'; Samir Melendez 61'; Ean Lewis 82'; Kyle Valerio 90+2'		Vallan Symms 74' (pen.)

Michael Ashcroft Stadium, Independence

19 August 2015
19:30

Police United	0 – 0	Belmopan Bandits

Norman Broaster Stadium, San Ignacio

==== Round 2 ====
22 August 2015
19:30

Belmopan Bandits	2 – 1	Wagiya
Evan Mariano 39'; Marlon Meza 44'		Eugene Martinez 1'

FFB Stadium, Belmopan

23 August 2015
15:00

Belize Defence Force	1 – 1	Verdes
Orlando Trapp 82'		Deon McCaulay 54'

MCC Grounds, Belize City

19 September 2015
19:30

Placencia Assassins	0 – 1	Police United
		Devon Makin 15'

Michael Ashcroft Stadium, Independence

==== Round 3 ====
29 August 2015
19:30

Wagiya	2 – 2	Police United
Eugene Martinez 54'; Erwin Middleton 83'		Harrison Roches 41', 73'

Michael Ashcroft Stadium, Independence

30 August 2015
15:30

Belize Defence Force	1 – 1	Placencia Assassins
Michael Martinez 29'		Alexander Peters 2'

MCC Grounds, Belize City

30 August 2015
16:00

Verdes	0 – 3 (awarded)	Belmopan Bandits

Norman Broaster Stadium, San Ignacio

==== Round 4 ====
12 September 2015
19:30

Belmopan Bandits	1 – 3	Placencia Assassins
Highking Roberts 58'		Alexander Peters 41'; Daiyon Coradon 48'; Lionel Cabral 85'

FFB Stadium, Belmopan

12 September 2015
19:30

Wagiya	2 – 3	Verdes
Kyle Valerio 14'; Brandon Cacho 46'		Deon McCaulay 37', 78', 90+'

Michael Ashcroft Stadium, Independence

13 September 2015
16:00

Police United	1 – 0	Belize Defence Force
Devon Makin 72'

Norman Broaster Stadium, San Ignacio

==== Round 5 ====
3 October 2015
19:30

Placencia Assassins	5 – 2	Wagiya
Alexander Peters 19'; Kareem Haylock 35'; Ashley Torres 41'; Dellon Torres 56'; Ashton Torres 71'		Eugene Martinez 64'; Donnel Arzu 80'

Michael Ashcroft Stadium, Independence

4 October 2015
16:00

Verdes	0 – 0	Police United

Norman Broaster Stadium, San Ignacio

21 October 2015
19:30

Belize Defence Force	3 – 4	Belmopan Bandits
Shane Flores 4', 63'; Paul Nunez 71'		Elroy Smith 21', 59'; Elroy Kuylen 42'; Highking Roberts 69'

FFB Stadium, Belmopan

==== Round 6 ====
24 October 2015
19:30

Belmopan Bandits	2 – 1	Police United
Jeromy James 44', 51'		Darren Myers 24'

FFB Stadium, Belmopan

25 October 2015
15:30

Belize Defence Force	5 – 0	Wagiya
James Flores 7', 45', 75'; Shane Flores 38'; Michael Myvette 60'

FFB Stadium, Belmopan

18 November 2015
19:30

Placencia Assassins	2 – 0	Verdes
Ernie Whyte 3'; Luis Torres 38'

Michael Ashcroft Stadium, Independence

==== Round 7 ====
31 October 2015
19:30

Police United	4 – 1	Placencia Assassins
Byron Chavez 15'; Trevor Lennan 24'; Darren Myers 29'; Carlton Thomas 42'		Luis Torres 1'

Norman Broaster Stadium, San Ignacio

31 October 2015
19:30

Wagiya	0 – 4	Belmopan Bandits
		Elroy Smith 61'; Jeromy James 74'; Randy Padilla 77'; Khalil Velasquez 86'

Michael Ashcroft Stadium, Independence

1 November 2015
16:00

Verdes	1 – 2	Belize Defence Force
Gilroy Thurton 51'		James Flores 32'; Paul Nunez 62'

Norman Broaster Stadium, San Ignacio

==== Round 8 ====
7 November 2015
19:30

Placencia Assassins	3 – 2	Belize Defence Force
Luis Torres 18', 47'; Ashley Torres 31'		James Flores 6'; Jesus Urbina 75' (o.g.)

Michael Ashcroft Stadium, Independence

8 November 2015
16:00

Police United	7 – 0	Wagiya
Byron Chavez 14'; Darren Myers 19'; Harrison Roches 23', 78' (pen.); Devon Makin 57'; Norman Nunez 82', 89'

Norman Broaster Stadium, San Ignacio

25 November 2015
19:30

Belmopan Bandits	1 – 1	Verdes
Jeromy James 25'		Deon McCaulay 66'

FFB Stadium, Belmopan

==== Round 9 ====
21 November 2015
19:30

Placencia Assassins	1 – 1	Belmopan Bandits
Alexander Peters (x1)		Elroy Kuylen (x1)

Michael Ashcroft Stadium, Independence

22 November 2015
16:00

Verdes	5 – 0	Wagiya
Deon McCaulay (x3); Marlon Molina (x1); Gilroy Thurton (x1)

Norman Broaster Stadium, San Ignacio

25 November 2015
19:30

Belize Defence Force	0 – 1	Police United
		Harrison Roches 71'

Norman Broaster Stadium, San Ignacio

==== Round 10 ====
28 November 2015
19:30

Belmopan Bandits	4 – 1	Belize Defence Force
Elroy Smith 31', 47'; Evan Mariano 59'; Jeromy James 66'		Paul Nunez 5'

FFB Stadium, Belmopan

28 November 2015
19:30

Wagiya	0 – 3	Placencia Assassins
		Alexander Peters 56', 76'; Ernie Whyte 85'

Michael Ashcroft Stadium, Independence

28 November 2015
16:00

Police United	1 – 1	Verdes
Harrison Roches 62'		Deon McCaulay 88'

Norman Broaster Stadium, San Ignacio

=== Playoffs ===
Semi-Finals
1	Belmopan Bandits	0	1	1
4	Verdes	2	1	3
2	Police United	1	2	3
3	Placencia Assassins	2	0	2

Finals
4	Verdes	0	0	0
2	Police United	1	0	1

==== Semi-finals ====
Game One

5 December 2015
19:30

Placencia Assassins	2 – 1	Police United
Alexander Peters 11'; Luis Torres 39'		Harrison Roches 83'

Michael Ashcroft Stadium, Independence

6 December 2015
16:30

Verdes	2 – 0	Belmopan Bandits
Jarret Davis 25', 27'

Norman Broaster Stadium, San Ignacio

Game Two

12 December 2015
19:30

Belmopan Bandits	1 – 1	Verdes
Randy Padilla 30'		Deon McCaulay 73'

FFB Stadium, Belmopan

Verdes won 3–1 on aggregate

13 December 2015
15:30

Police United	2 – 0	Placencia Assassins
Orlando Jimenez 77', 90'

FFB Stadium, Belmopan

Police United won 3–2 on aggregate

==== Finals ====
Game One

20 December 2015
16:00

Verdes	0 – 1	Police United
		Orlando Jimenez 50'

Norman Broaster Stadium, San Ignacio
Referee: Irfan Basdemir

Game Two

27 December 2015
16:00

Police United	0 – 0	Verdes

FFB Stadium, Belmopan
Referee: Christopher Reid

Police United won 1–0 on aggregate

2015–16 Opening Season champions

2nd title

=== Season Statistics ===
==== Top scorers ====
Rank	Player	Team	Goals^{*}
1	(Belize) Deon McCaulay	Verdes	10
2	(Belize) Alexander Peters	Placencia Assassins	7
2	(Belize) Harrison Roches	Police United	7
4	(Belize) James Flores	Belize Defence Force	5
4	(Belize) Jeromy James	Belmopan Bandits	5
4	(Belize) Elroy Smith	Belmopan Bandits	5
4	(Belize) Luis Torres	Placencia Assassins	5
8	(Belize) Eugene Martinez	Wagiya	4
9	(Belize) Shane Flores	Belize Defence Force	3
9	(Belize) Orlando Jimenez	Police United	3
9	(Belize) Devon Makin	Police United	3
9	(Belize) Darren Myers	Police United	3
9	(Belize) Paul Nunez	Belize Defence Force	3

^{*} Includes playoff goals.

==== Hat-tricks ====
Player	For	Against	Result	Date
(Belize) Deon McCaulay	Verdes	Wagiya	3–2 (A)	12 September 2015
(Belize) James Flores	Belize Defence Force	Wagiya	5–0 (H)	25 October 2015
(Belize) Deon McCaulay	Verdes	Wagiya	5–0 (H)	22 November 2015

=== Awards ===
In the post-game ceremonies of the final game of the season, the individual awards were announced.

Award	Recipient	Team
Golden Boot	(Belize) Deon McCaulay	Verdes
MVP (Regular Season)	(Belize) Luis Torres	Placencia Assassins
MVP (Playoff)	(Belize) Trevor Lennan	Police United
Best Young Player	(Belize) Darren Myers	Police United
Best Midfielder	(Belize) Denmark Casey Jr.	Belmopan Bandits
Best Defender	(Belize) Dalton Eiley	Placencia Assassins
Golden Glove	(Belize) Jaime Brooks	Police United
Best Coach	(Belize) Hilberto Muschamp	Police United

== Closing season ==
All 6 teams that participated in the opening season will participate in the closing season.

The format will be the same as the opening season with one league consisting of the 6 teams, who will play each other twice, with the top 4 teams advancing to the end of season playoffs. The closing season commenced on 23 January 2016.

=== League table ===
Pos	Team	Pld	W	D	L	GF	GA	GD	Pts	Qualification
1	Police United (Q)	10	6	3	1	21	15	+6	21	Qualification to the Playoffs
2	Belize Defence Force (Q)	10	6	2	2	16	9	+7	20	Qualification to the Playoffs
3	Belmopan Bandits (Q)	10	5	3	2	14	5	+9	18	Qualification to the Playoffs
4	Placencia Assassins (Q)	10	3	3	4	15	16	−1	12	Qualification to the Playoffs
5	Verdes	10	3	1	6	13	15	−2	10	
6	Wagiya	10	1	0	9	4	23	−19	3	

Source: Soccerway
Rules for classification: 1) points; 2) goal difference; 3) number of goals scored.
(Q) Qualified for the phase indicated

=== Results ===
==== Round 1 ====
23 January 2016
19:30

Belmopan Bandits	1 – 1	Police United
Elroy Smith 28' (pen.)		Daniel Jimenez 72'

FFB Stadium, Belmopan

4 February 2016
19:30

Verdes	3 – 1	Belize Defence Force
Deon McCaulay 10'; Jarret Davis 39'; Vallan Symms 76' (o.g.)		Vallan Symms 54' (pen.)

Norman Broaster Stadium, San Ignacio

4 February 2016
19:30

Wagiya	0 – 3	Placencia Assassins
		Luis Torres 43'; Ashton Torres 72'; Ashley Torres 85'

Michael Ashcroft Stadium, Independence

==== Round 2 ====
30 January 2016
19:30

Police United	4 – 2	Wagiya
Darren Myers 12'; Daniel Jimenez 58'; Harrison Roches 84'; Devon Makin 86'		Jacinto Bermudez 7'; Donnel Arzu 15'

Norman Broaster Stadium, San Ignacio

31 January 2016
15:30

Belize Defence Force	0 – 0	Belmopan Bandits

MCC Grounds, Belize City

10 February 2016
19:30

Placencia Assassins	1 – 1	Verdes
Alexander Peters (x1)		Nahjib Guerra (x1)

Michael Ashcroft Stadium, Independence

==== Round 3 ====
6 February 2016
19:30

Wagiya	0 – 3	Belmopan Bandits
		Jordy Polanco 79'; Elroy Smith 88'; Marlon Meza 90'

Michael Ashcroft Stadium, Independence

7 February 2016
15:30

Belize Defence Force	3 – 1	Placencia Assassins
Harrison Tasher 47', 53'; Leon Cadle 85'		Dalton Eiley 75' (pen.)

MCC Grounds, Belize City

7 February 2016
16:00

Verdes	2 – 3	Police United
Nahjib Guerra 4'; Gilroy Thurton 60'		Amin August Jr. 29'; Devon Makin 75'; Elio Ramirez 86'

Michael Ashcroft Stadium, Independence

==== Round 4 ====
13 February 2016
19:30

Belmopan Bandits	2 – 0	Verdes
Kervin Johnson 8'; Marlon Meza 48'

FFB Stadium, Belmopan

13 February 2016
19:30

Wagiya	0 – 1	Belize Defence Force
		Ricky Ricketts 40'

Michael Ashcroft Stadium, Independence

14 February 2016
16:00

Police United	4 – 3	Placencia Assassins
Kenroy Arthurs 13'; Byron Usher 33'; Devon Makin 40'; Elio Ramirez 83'		Ashley Torres 41'; Luis Torres 43' (pen.); Leonard Valdez 59'

Norman Broaster Stadium, San Ignacio

==== Round 5 ====
20 February 2016
19:30

Placencia Assassins	0 – 0	Belmopan Bandits

Michael Ashcroft Stadium, Independence

21 February 2016
15:30

Belize Defence Force	2 – 2	Police United
Kadeem Martinez 80'; Harrison Tasher 87'		Devon Makin 36'; Harrison Roches 63'

MCC Grounds, Belize City

21 February 2016
16:00

Verdes	0 – 1	Wagiya
		Jose Martinez 27'

Norman Broaster Stadium, San Ignacio

==== Round 6 ====
27 February 2016
19:30

Placencia Assassins	1 – 0	Wagiya
Luis Torres 67'

Michael Ashcroft Stadium, Independence

28 February 2016
16:00

Police United	0 – 2	Belmopan Bandits
		Amilton Filho 38'; Marlon Meza 78' (pen.)

Norman Broaster Stadium, San Ignacio

3 April 2016
15:30

Belize Defence Force	1 – 0	Verdes
Paul Nunez 82'

MCC Grounds, Belize City

==== Round 7 ====
6 March 2016
16:00

Belmopan Bandits	0 – 1	Belize Defence Force
		Osmar Duran 16'

FFB Stadium, Belmopan

6 March 2016
16:00

Verdes	2 – 3	Placencia Assassins
Jarret Davis 28', 66'		Luis Torres 69'; Dellon Torres 84', 90+'

Norman Broaster Stadium, San Ignacio

31 March 2016
19:30

Wagiya	1 – 2	Police United
Erwin Middleton 68'		John King 16'; Devon Makin 58'

Michael Ashcroft Stadium, Independence

==== Round 8 ====
12 March 2016
19:30

Belmopan Bandits	3 – 0	Wagiya
Eugene Martinez 34'; Jordy Polanco 61'; Rai West 69'

FFB Stadium, Belmopan

12 March 2016
19:30

Placencia Assassins	1 – 3	Belize Defence Force
Mario Villanueva 61'		Harrison Tasher 32'; Osmar Duran 40'; Paul Nunez 81'

Michael Ashcroft Stadium, Independence

13 March 2016
16:00

Police United	2 – 0	Verdes
Andres Makin Jr. 4'; Carlton Thomas 18'

Norman Broaster Stadium, San Ignacio

==== Round 9 ====
20 March 2016
15:30

Belize Defence Force	3 – 0	Wagiya
Mark Arzu 32'; Ricky Ricketts 38'; Osmar Duran 41'

MCC Grounds, Belize City

20 March 2016
16:00

Verdes	2 – 1	Belmopan Bandits
Jamil Cano 62'; Cristobal Gilharry 85'		Elroy Smith 41'

Norman Broaster Stadium, San Ignacio

2 April 2016
19:30

Placencia Assassins	1 – 1	Police United
Lionel Cabral 13'		Andres Makin Jr. 3'

Michael Ashcroft Stadium, Independence

==== Round 10 ====
24 March 2016
19:30

Belmopan Bandits	2 – 1	Placencia Assassins
Kervin Johnson 9'; Randy Padilla 58'		Ashley Torres 64'

Isidoro Beaton Stadium, Belmopan

24 March 2016
19:30

Police United	2 – 1	Belize Defence Force
Daniel Jimenez 68'; Jermaine Jones 79'		Harrison Tasher 28'

Norman Broaster Stadium, San Ignacio

24 March 2016
19:30

Wagiya	0 – 3	Verdes
		Deon McCaulay 66', 75'; Rodney Pacheco 90+' (pen.)

Michael Ashcroft Stadium, Independence

=== Playoffs ===
Semi-Finals
1	Police United	3	2	5 (7)
4	Placencia Assassins (p)	2	3	5 (8)
2	Belize Defence Force	1	1	2
3	Belmopan Bandits	2	1	3

Finals
4	Placencia Assassins	0	0	0
3	Belmopan Bandits	0	2	2

==== Semi-finals ====
Game One

9 April 2016
19:30

Belmopan Bandits	2 – 1	Belize Defence Force
Kervin Johnson 17'; Ian Gaynair 22'		Ricky Ricketts 73'

Isidoro Beaton Stadium, Belmopan

9 April 2016
19:30

Placencia Assassins	2 – 3	Police United
Ashton Torres 3'; Mario Villanueva 52'		Devon Makin 5'; Harrison Roches 24'; Amin August Jr. 63'

Michael Ashcroft Stadium, Independence

Game Two

17 April 2016
15:30

Belize Defence Force	1 – 1	Belmopan Bandits
Leon Cadle 78'		Elroy Smith 45' (pen.)

MCC Grounds, Belize City

Belmopan Bandits won 3–2 on aggregate.

17 April 2016
16:00

Police United	2 – 3 (a.e.t.)	Placencia Assassins
Harrison Roches 27' (pen.); Byron Usher 67'		Dalton Eiley 16' (pen.); Gilbert Swaso 34'; Ernie Whyte 51'
Penalties
Trevor Lennan (penalty scored); Darren Myers (penalty scored); John King (penalty scored); Elio Ramirez (penalty scored); Kenroy Arthurs (penalty scored); Frank Lopez (penalty scored); Andres Makin Jr. (penalty scored)	7 – 8	(penalty scored) Ashton Torres; (penalty scored) Lionel Cabral; (penalty scored) Charles Leslie; (penalty scored) Dalton Eiley; (penalty scored) Kareem Haylock; (penalty scored) Dellon Torres; (penalty scored) Ashley Torres; (penalty scored) Mario Villanueva

Norman Broaster Stadium, San Ignacio

Series tied 5–5 on aggregate. Placencia Assassins won 8–7 on penalties.

==== Finals ====
Game One

23 April 2016
19:30

Placencia Assassins	0 – 0	Belmopan Bandits

Michael Ashcroft Stadium, Independence
Referee: Christopher Reid

Game Two

30 April 2016
19:30

Belmopan Bandits	2 – 0	Placencia Assassins
Kervin Johnson 29'; Randy Padilla 83'

Isidoro Beaton Stadium, Belmopan
Referee: Irfan Basdemir

Belmopan Bandits won 2–0 on aggregate.

2015–16 Closing Season champions

5th title

=== Season statistics ===
==== Top scorers ====
Rank	Player	Team	Goals^{*}
1	(Belize) Devon Makin	Police United	6
2	(Belize) Harrison Tasher	Belize Defence Force	5
3	(Honduras) Kervin Johnson	Belmopan Bandits	4
3	(Belize) Harrison Roches	Police United	4
3	(Belize) Elroy Smith	Belmopan Bandits	4
3	(Belize) Luis Torres	Placencia Assassins	4
7	(Belize) Jarret Davis	Verdes	3
7	(Belize) Osmar Duran	Belize Defence Force	3
7	(Belize) Daniel Jimenez	Police United	3
7	(Belize) Deon McCaulay	Verdes	3
7	(Belize) Marlon Meza	Belmopan Bandits	3
7	(Belize) Ricky Ricketts	Belize Defence Force	3
7	(Belize) Ashley Torres	Placencia Assassins	3

^{*} Includes playoff goals.

=== Awards ===
In the post-game ceremonies of the final game of the season, the individual awards were announced.

Award	Recipient	Team
Golden Boot (Regular Season)	(Belize) Devon Makin	Police United
Golden Boot (Regular Season)	(Belize) Harrison Tasher	Belize Defence Force
Golden Boot (Overall)	(Belize) Devon Makin	Police United
MVP (Regular Season)	(Belize) Dalton Eiley	Placencia Assassins
MVP (Playoff)	(Belize) Elroy Smith	Belmopan Bandits
Best Young Player	(Belize) Jordy Polanco	Belmopan Bandits
Best Midfielder	(Belize) Denmark Casey Jr.	Belmopan Bandits
Best Defender	(Belize) Dalton Eiley	Placencia Assassins
Golden Glove	(Belize) Shane Orio	Belmopan Bandits
Best Manager	(Belize) Alford Grinage	Police United
Best Coach	(Belize) Robert Muschamp	Placencia Assassins
