= 2017–18 Premier League of Belize =

Premier League of Belize
- Season: 2017–18
- Dates: 12 August 2017 – 21 May 2018
- Champions: Opening: Verdes; Closing: Belmopan Bandits
- CONCACAF League: Belmopan Bandits
- Matches: 123
- Goals: 445 (3.62 per match)
- Top goalscorer: Opening: Georgie Welcome (18); Closing: Trimayne Harris (13)
- Biggest home win: Belmopan Bandits 7-0 Freedom Fighters (4 November 2017); Belize Defence Force 7-0 Freedom Fighters (12 November 2017)
- Biggest away win: Belize Defence Force 1-7 Verdes (18 November 2017); San Pedro Pirates 0-6 Belmopan Bandits (19 November 2017)
- Highest scoring: Police United 6-3 Wagiya (8 October 2017)
- Longest winning run: Belmopan Bandits (8)
- Longest unbeaten run: Belmopan Bandits (13)
- Longest winless run: Wagiya (13)
- Longest losing run: Freedom Fighters (10)

The 2017–18 Premier League of Belize was the seventh season of the highest competitive football league in Belize, after it was founded in 2011. There were two seasons which were spread over two years. The opening was played towards the end of 2017 and the closing was played at the beginning of 2018.

== Team information ==
Team	City	Stadium
Belize Defence Force	Belize City	MCC Grounds
Belmopan Bandits	Belmopan	Isidoro Beaton Stadium
Freedom Fighters	Punta Gorda	Victor Sanchez Union Field
Placencia Assassins	Independence	Michael Ashcroft Stadium
Police United	Belmopan	Isidoro Beaton Stadium
San Pedro Pirates	San Pedro	Ambergris Stadium
Verdes	San Ignacio	Norman Broaster Stadium
Wagiya	Dangriga	Carl Ramos Stadium

== Opening season ==
From the 2016–17 Premier League of Belize closing season, 7 teams continued to play in the opening season of 2017–18. FC Belize were replaced by a newly formed team, San Pedro Pirates, making 8 teams in total.

There would be one league consisting of the 8 teams, who will play each other twice, with the top 4 teams advancing to the end of season playoffs. The opening season commenced on 12 August 2017.

=== League table ===
Pos	Team	Pld	W	D	L	GF	GA	GD	Pts	Qualification
1	Belmopan Bandits	14	11	2	1	38	12	+26	35	Qualification to the Playoffs
2	Verdes (C)	14	9	3	2	26	11	+15	30	Qualification to the Playoffs
3	Belize Defence Force	14	6	3	5	23	16	+7	21	Qualification to the Playoffs
4	San Pedro Pirates	14	6	2	6	26	21	+5	20	Qualification to the Playoffs
5	Police United	14	6	2	6	27	25	+2	20	
6	Placencia Assassins	14	4	4	6	22	27	−5	16	
7	Wagiya	14	3	2	9	26	46	−20	11	
8	Freedom Fighters	14	2	0	12	16	46	−30	6	

Source: Soccerway
Rules for classification: 1) points; 2) goal difference; 3) number of goals scored.
(C) Champions

=== Results ===
Home \ Away	BDF	BEL	FRE	PLA	POL	SPE	VER	WAG
Belize Defence Force		1–0	7–0	2–1	1–1	1–0	0–2	2–0
Belmopan Bandits	2–1		7–0	3–1	3–2	2–0	1–0	7–2
Freedom Fighters	0–3	0–2		3–0	1–2	3–4	1–4	1–3
Placencia Assassins	3–1	1–1	2–1		1–0	1–1	1–5	6–1
Police United	2–1	1–5	1–3	4–2		1–2	1–0	6–3
San Pedro Pirates	1–1	1–2	2–0	3–1	3–2		1–2	5–0
Verdes	3–1	1–1	3–1	0–0	0–0	1–0		1–0
Wagiya	1–1	1–2	6–2	2–2	0–4	4–3	3–4	

Updated to match(es) played on 12 November 2017. Source: Soccerway
Legend: Blue = home team win; Yellow = draw; Red = away team win.

=== Playoffs ===
Semi-Finals
1	Belmopan Bandits	6	3	9
4	San Pedro Pirates	0	1	1
2	Verdes	7	2	9
3	Belize Defence Force	1	2	3

Finals
1	Belmopan Bandits	0	2	2
2	Verdes (a)	1	1	2

==== Semi-finals ====
Game One

18 November 2017	Belize Defence Force	1–7	Verdes	MCC Grounds, Belize City
16:00	Vallan Symms 30' (pen.)		Alcides Thomas 15', 46', 73'; Roberto Silva de Lima 51'; Gilroy Thurton 68'; Elroy Kuylen 69'; Richard Jimenez 89'

19 November 2017	San Pedro Pirates	0–6	Belmopan Bandits	Ambergris Stadium, San Pedro
18:30			Darwin Bermudez 18'; Elroy Smith 20'; Jeromy James 33'; Georgie Welcome 42', 74'; Kervin Johnson 86'

Game Two

25 November 2017	Belmopan Bandits	3–1 (9 – 1 agg.)	San Pedro Pirates	Isidoro Beaton Stadium, Belmopan
20:00	Georgie Welcome 3', 34'; Jeromy James 51'		Jesse Smith 47'

26 November 2017	Verdes	2–2 (9 – 3 agg.)	Belize Defence Force	Norman Broaster Stadium, San Ignacio
16:00	Alcides Thomas 17'; Gilroy Thurton 36'		Shane Flores 67'; Trimayne Harris 81' (pen.)

==== Finals ====
Game One

3 December 2017	Verdes	1–0	Belmopan Bandits	Norman Broaster Stadium, San Ignacio
16:00	Roberto Silva de Lima 84'			Referee: Christopher Reid

Game Two

9 December 2017	Belmopan Bandits	2–1 (2 – 2 (a) agg.)	Verdes	Isidoro Beaton Stadium, Belmopan
20:00	Darwin Bermudez 22'; Jeromy James 43'		Kervin Johnson 5' (o.g.)

2017–18 Opening Season champions

2nd title

=== Season statistics ===
==== Top scorers ====
Rank	Player	Team	Goals^{*}
1	(Honduras) Georgie Welcome	Belmopan Bandits	18
2	(Brazil) Alcides Thomas	Verdes	14
3	(Belize) Daniel Jimenez	Police United	10
3	(Belize) Krisean Lopez	Wagiya	10
5	(Belize) Jaren Lambey	Belize Defence Force	9
5	(Mexico) Hector Martinez	San Pedro Pirates	9
7	(Honduras) Darwin Bermudez	Belmopan Bandits	7
7	(Belize) Jeromy James	Belmopan Bandits	7
7	(Belize) Elroy Kuylen	Verdes	7
7	(Belize) Luis Torres	Placencia Assassins	7
11	(Belize) Shane Flores	Belize Defence Force	6
11	(Belize) Elroy Smith	Belmopan Bandits	6

^{*} Includes playoff goals.

==== Hat-tricks ====
Player	For	Against	Result	Date
(Brazil) Alcides Thomas	Verdes	Belize Defence Force	3–1 (H)	3 September 2017
(Belize) Daniel Jimenez	Police United	Wagiya	6–3 (H)	8 October 2017
(Belize) Krisean Lopez	Wagiya	Freedom Fighters	6–2 (H)	15 October 2017
(Honduras) Georgie Welcome^{5}	Belmopan Bandits	Freedom Fighters	7–0 (H)	4 November 2017
(Honduras) Georgie Welcome	Belmopan Bandits	Wagiya	7–2 (H)	11 November 2017
(Belize) Jaren Lambey^{4}	Belize Defence Force	Freedom Fighters	7–0 (H)	12 November 2017
(Brazil) Alcides Thomas	Verdes	Belize Defence Force	7–1 (A)	18 November 2017

^{4} Player scored 4 goals
^{5} Player scored 5 goals

=== Awards ===
In the post-game ceremonies of the final game of the season, the individual awards were announced.

Award	Recipient	Team
Golden Boot	(Honduras) Georgie Welcome	Belmopan Bandits
MVP (Regular Season)	(Honduras) Georgie Welcome	Belmopan Bandits
MVP (Playoff)	(Brazil) Roberto Silva de Lima	Verdes
Best Young Player	(Belize) Krisean Lopez	Wagiya
Best Forward	(Honduras) Georgie Welcome	Belmopan Bandits
Best Midfielder	(Belize) Denmark Casey Jr.	Verdes
Best Defender	(Belize) Elroy Smith	Belmopan Bandits
Golden Glove	(Honduras) Selvin Zeron Sagastume	Verdes
Best Coach	(Belize) Marvin Ottley	Verdes
Best Manager	(Belize) Lorin Frazer	Verdes

== Closing season ==
All 8 teams that participated in the opening season will participate in the closing season.

The format will be the same as the opening season with one league consisting of the 8 teams, who will play each other twice, with the top 4 teams advancing to the end of season playoffs. The closing season commenced on 13 January 2018.

=== League table ===
Pos	Team	Pld	W	D	L	GF	GA	GD	Pts	Qualification
1	Belmopan Bandits (C)	14	9	4	1	33	19	+14	31	Qualification to the Playoffs
2	Verdes	14	9	2	3	32	14	+18	29	Qualification to the Playoffs
3	Belize Defence Force	14	6	2	6	26	18	+8	20	Qualification to the Playoffs
4	Police United	14	6	2	6	26	28	−2	20	Qualification to the Playoffs
5	Freedom Fighters	14	5	1	8	25	31	−6	16	
6	San Pedro Pirates	13	5	0	8	21	28	−7	15	
7	Wagiya	13	4	2	7	17	28	−11	14	
8	Placencia Assassins	14	2	5	7	15	29	−14	11	

Source: Soccerway
Rules for classification: 1) points; 2) goal difference; 3) number of goals scored.
(C) Champions

=== Results ===
Home \ Away	BDF	BEL	FRE	PLA	POL	SPE	VER	WAG
Belize Defence Force		2–2	2–3	3–0	3–2	4–0	1–3	2–0
Belmopan Bandits	2–1		4–2	3–1	2–1	3–1	1–1	1–2
Freedom Fighters	0–3	2–4		0–0	2–1	2–1	0–3	6–0
Placencia Assassins	1–1	2–2	3–2		2–3	1–0	0–2	1–4
Police United	1–0	0–2	2–1	3–3		3–1	2–1	1–1
San Pedro Pirates	2–1	3–4	4–1	3–0	1–6		0–1	3–1
Verdes	2–1	1–1	1–2	2–0	7–1	1–2		3–2
Wagiya	0–2	0–2	3–2	1–1	2–0		1–4	

Updated to match(es) played on 15 April 2018. Source: Soccerway
Legend: Blue = home team win; Yellow = draw; Red = away team win.

=== Playoffs ===
Semi-Finals
1	Belmopan Bandits (a)	2	1	3
4	Police United	2	1	3
2	Verdes	0	0	0
3	Belize Defence Force	2	0	2

Finals
1	Belmopan Bandits	3	5	8
3	Belize Defence Force	1	3	4

==== Semi-finals ====
Game One

21 April 2018	Police United	2–2	Belmopan Bandits	Isidoro Beaton Stadium, Belmopan
20:00	Marlon Meza 49'; Harrison Roches 79'		Jeromy James 26'; Tyrone Pandy 90+2'

22 April 2018	Belize Defence Force	2–0	Verdes	MCC Grounds, Belize City
16:00	Trimayne Harris 43', 83'

Game Two

28 April 2018	Belmopan Bandits	1–1 (3 – 3 (a) agg.)	Police United	Isidoro Beaton Stadium, Belmopan
20:00	Jeromy James 82'		Devon Makin 27'

16 May 2018	Verdes	0–0 (0 – 2 agg.)	Belize Defence Force	Norman Broaster Stadium, San Ignacio
19:30

==== Finals ====
Game One

19 May 2018	Belize Defence Force	1–3	Belmopan Bandits	MCC Grounds, Belize City
16:00	Trimayne Harris 90+2'		Tyrone Pandy 10'; Rony Flores 42'; Jeromy James 74'	Referee: Juan Alas

Game Two

21 May 2018	Belmopan Bandits	5–3 (8–4 agg.)	Belize Defence Force	Isidoro Beaton Stadium, Belmopan
20:00	Rony Flores 22'; Georgie Welcome 29', 37', 54' (pen.); Darwin Bermudez 88'		Trimayne Harris 25', 73' (pen.); Tarell Flores 62'

2017–18 Closing Season champions

8th title

=== Season statistics ===
==== Top scorers ====
Rank	Player	Team	Goals^{*}
1	(Belize) Trimayne Harris	Belize Defence Force	13
2	(Belize) Jonard Castillo	Wagiya	10
2	(Honduras) Rony Flores	Belmopan Bandits	10
4	(Mexico) Hector Martinez	Belmopan Bandits	8
4	(Belize) Elroy Smith	Belmopan Bandits	8
4	(Brazil) Alcides Thomas	Verdes	8
7	(Belize) Jarret Davis	Verdes	6
7	(Belize) Alexander Peters	Freedom Fighters	6
7	(Belize) Luis Torres	Placencia Assassins	6
7	(Honduras) Georgie Welcome	Belmopan Bandits	6
11	(Mexico) Inri Gonzaga	San Pedro Pirates	5
11	(Belize) Daniel Jimenez	Police United	5
11	(Belize) Krisean Lopez	Verdes	5

^{*} Includes playoff goals.

==== Hat-tricks ====
Player	For	Against	Result	Date
(Belize) Byron Usher	Police United	San Pedro Pirates	6–1 (A)	14 January 2018
(Belize) Luis Torres	Placencia Assassins	Police United	3–3 (A)	21 January 2018
(Belize) Luis Mencia	San Pedro Pirates	Freedom Fighters	4–1 (H)	18 February 2018
(Mexico) Hector Martinez	Belmopan Bandits	San Pedro Pirates	4–3 (A)	11 March 2018
(Honduras) Georgie Welcome	Belmopan Bandits	Belize Defence Force	5–3 (H)	21 May 2018

=== Awards ===
In the post-game ceremonies of the final game of the season, the individual awards were announced.

Award	Recipient	Team
Golden Boot (Regular Season)	(Belize) Jonard Castillo	Wagiya
Golden Boot (Overall)	(Belize) Trimayne Harris	Belize Defence Force
MVP (Regular Season)	(Belize) Trimayne Harris	Belize Defence Force
MVP (Playoff)	(Honduras) Georgie Welcome	Belmopan Bandits
Best Young Player	(Belize) Jonard Castillo	Wagiya
Best Midfielder	(Belize) Denmark Casey Jr.	Verdes
Best Defender	(Belize) Dalton Eiley	Belmopan Bandits
Golden Glove	(Honduras) Selvin Zeron Sagastume	Verdes
Best Coach	(Belize) Kent Gabourel	Belmopan Bandits
Best Manager	(Belize) Captain Kenrick Martinez	Belize Defence Force

== Aggregate table ==
Pos	Team	Pld	W	D	L	GF	GA	GD	Pts	Qualification
1	Belmopan Bandits	28	20	6	2	71	31	+40	66	2018 CONCACAF League
2	Verdes	28	18	5	5	58	25	+33	59	
3	Belize Defence Force	28	12	5	11	49	36	+13	41	
4	Police United	28	12	4	12	43	53	−10	40	
5	San Pedro Pirates	27	11	2	14	47	49	−2	35	
6	Placencia Assassins	28	6	9	13	37	56	−19	27	
7	Wagiya	27	7	4	16	43	74	−31	25	
8	Freedom Fighters	28	7	1	20	31	77	−46	22	

Source: Soccerway
Rules for classification: 1) points; 2) goal difference; 3) number of goals scored.
