= 2022–23 Premier League of Belize =

Premier League of Belize
- Season: 2022–23
- Dates: 30 July 2022 – 28 May 2023
- Champions: Opening: Altitude; Closing: Verdes
- CONCACAF Central American Cup: Verdes
- Matches: 124
- Goals: 346 (2.79 per match)
- Top goalscorer: Opening: Andres Orozco (11 goals); Closing: Horace Avila (9 goals)
- Biggest home win: Opening: Verdes 5–0 Belmopan Bandits (11 September 2022); Port Layola 5–0 Belmopan Bandits (23 October 2022); Closing: Verdes 5–0 Internacional FC (5 March 2023)
- Biggest away win: Opening: Belmopan Bandits 0–4 Verdes (29 October 2022); Closing: Wagiya 0–8 Progresso (9 April 2023)
- Highest scoring: Opening: Belmopan Bandits 4–2 Wagiya (24 September 2022); Closing: Port Layola 6–2 Wagiya (5 March 2023); Wagiya 0–8 Progresso (9 April 2023)
- Longest winning run: Opening: 3 matches Altitude; San Pedro Pirates; Verdes; Wagiya; Closing: 4 matches Progresso
- Longest unbeaten run: Opening: 9 matches Verdes; Closing: 11 matches Progresso
- Longest winless run: Opening: 8 matches Belmopan Bandits; Closing: 14 matches Internacional FC
- Longest losing run: Opening: 4 matches Belmopan Bandits; Port Layola; Wagiya; Closing: 10 matches Internacional FC

The 2022–23 Premier League of Belize is the tenth season of the Premier League of Belize, the highest competitive football league in Belize, after it was founded in 2011. The league commenced in July 2022 and is scheduled to end in mid 2023. The season is divided into two halves (opening and closing), each crowning one champion.

== Teams ==
There were eight teams that participated in the 2022–23 season. From the 2021–22 FFB Top League, administered by the Football Federation of Belize, four teams returned to the league. These were Altitude, San Pedro Pirates, Verdes and Wagiya. After a brief hiatus from top level football, Belmopan Bandits also returned to the league. The three other teams were made up of Benque Viejo United, who played under the license of Police United, Progresso from Orange Walk, who previously competed in amateur level competitions in the country, and Port Layola, a newly formed team from Belize City.

Team	City	Stadium	Capacity
Altitude	Independence	Michael Ashcroft Stadium	2,000
Benque Viejo United	Benque	Marshalleck Stadium	2,000
Internacional FC (Note: Belmopan Bandits changed their name to Internacional Futbol Club in February 2023.)	Belmopan	Isidoro Beaton Stadium	2,500
Port Layola	Belize City	MCC Grounds; Marion Jones Sports Complex	2,000; 7,500
Progresso	Orange Walk	Orange Walk People's Stadium	4,500
San Pedro Pirates	San Pedro	Ambergris Stadium	1,500
Verdes	San Ignacio	Norman Broaster Stadium	2,000
Wagiya	Dangriga	Carl Ramos Stadium	3,500

== Opening season ==
The General Manager of the league, Wіlhеlm Міguеl ѕtated that thе format of the oреnіng sеаѕоn wіll initially fеаturе а dоublе rоund rоbіn рhаѕе. The top fоur ranked tеаmѕ will then quаlіfу for a hоmе аnd аwау ѕеmіfіnаls, with thе wіnnеrѕ mееting іn a twо-gаmе fіnаlѕ. The opening season commenced on 30 July 2022.

=== League table ===
Pos	Team	Pld	W	D	L	GF	GA	GD	Pts	Qualification or relegation
1	Altitude	14	10	2	2	22	10	+12	32	Advance to Playoffs
2	Verdes	14	7	6	1	24	9	+15	27	Advance to Playoffs
3	San Pedro Pirates	14	6	5	3	20	13	+7	23	Advance to Playoffs
4	Progresso	14	4	6	4	12	12	0	18	Advance to Playoffs
5	Benque Viejo United	14	4	4	6	15	17	−2	16	
6	Port Layola	14	5	1	8	17	20	−3	16	
7	Wagiya	14	4	2	8	15	23	−8	14	
8	Belmopan Bandits	14	2	2	10	11	32	−21	8	

Source: Soccerway
Rules for classification: 1) points; 2) goal difference; 3) number of goals scored.

=== Results ===
Home \ Away	ALT	BEL	BEN	POR	PRO	SPE	VER	WAG
Altitude		1–0	2–0	2–1	2–1	1–0	0–1	2–1
Belmopan Bandits	0–2		3–2	0–1	0–1	0–1	0–4	4–2
Benque Viejo United	1–4	0–0		1–0	0–0	0–0	2–0	1–1
Port Layola	3–2	5–0	1–3		0–1	2–1	1–3	0–3
Progresso	0–0	2–2	2–0	1–0		2–2	0–2	0–1
San Pedro Pirates	0–1	4–1	2–1	3–2	1–1		2–2	2–0
Verdes	1–1	5–0	1–0	0–0	1–1	0–0		2–0
Wagiya	1–2	2–1	1–4	0–1	1–0	0–2	2–2	

Source: Soccerway
Legend: Blue = home team win; Yellow = draw; Red = away team win.

=== Playoffs ===
Semifinals
1	Altitude	2	1	3
4	Progresso	1	0	1
2	Verdes	2	3	5
3	San Pedro Pirates	2	2	4

Finals
1	Altitude (p)	1	1	2 (11)
2	Verdes	1	1	2 (10)

==== Semifinals ====
Game One

12 November 2022	San Pedro Pirates	2 – 2	Verdes	Ambergris Stadium, San Pedro
19:30	Andir Chi 80'; Erick Izquierdo 90+3'		Desmond Wade 60'; Krisean Lopez 90+5'

13 November 2022	Progresso	1 – 2	Altitude	Orange Walk People's Stadium, Orange Walk
15:30	Dedron Baptist 80'		Dellon Torres 54'; Aloisio Teixeira 82'

Game Two

19 November 2022	Altitude	1 – 0 (3 – 1 agg.)	Progresso	Michael Ashcroft Stadium, Independence
20:00	Miguel Garcia 58'

20 November 2022	Verdes	3 – 2 (5 – 4 agg.)	San Pedro Pirates	Norman Broaster Stadium, San Ignacio
16:00	Darrell Myvett 14'; Desmond Wade 27'; Trimayne Harris 58'		Horace Avila 42'; Erick Izquierdo 66'

==== Finals ====
Game One

27 November 2022	Verdes	1 – 1	Altitude	Norman Broaster Stadium, San Ignacio
15:30	Luis Ibarra 71'		Rene Leslie 78'

Game Two

11 December 2022	Altitude	1 – 1 (a.e.t.) (2 – 2 agg.) (11 – 10 p)	Verdes	Isidoro Beaton Stadium, Belmopan
18:00	Luis Torres 52'		Luis Ibarra 45'

=== Season statistics ===
==== Top scorers ====
Rank	Player	Team	Goals^{*}
1	(Colombia) Andres Orozco	Altitude	11
2	(Paraguay) Luis Ibarra	Verdes	9
3	(Belize) Horace Avila	San Pedro Pirates	7
3	(Belize) Sean Young	Port Layola	7
5	(Belize) Trimayne Harris	Verdes	6
5	(Mexico) Erick Izquierdo	San Pedro Pirates	6
7	(Belize) Cion Augustine	Wagiya	5
7	(Belize) Zamir Bonilla	Progresso	5
7	(Belize) Desmond Wade	Verdes	5

^{*} Includes playoff goals.

==== Hat-tricks ====
Player	For	Against	Result	Date
(Belize) Jaren Lambey	Belmopan Bandits	Wagiya	4–2 (H)	24 September 2022
(Argentina) Ayrton Sisa	Benque Viejo United	Port Layola	3–1 (A)	25 September 2022
(Belize) Desmond Wade	Verdes	Belmopan Bandits	4–0 (A)	29 October 2022

=== Attendances ===
The average league attendance was 289:

#	Club	Average
1	San Pedro Pirates	427
2	Verdes	358
3	Altitude	347
4	Belmopan Bandits	293
5	Port Layola	271
6	Progresso	252
7	Wagiya	189
8	Benque Viejo United	177

== Closing season ==
All eight teams that participated in the opening season participated in the closing season.

The format will be the same as the opening season with one league consisting of the eight teams, who will play each other twice, with the top four teams advancing to the end of season playoffs. The closing season commenced on 14 January 2023.

In February 2023, part way through the closing season, Belmopan Bandits changed their name to Internacional Futbol Club, after striking a sponsorship deal with a team from Mexico.

Also in February 2023, the Football Federation of Belize Арреаlѕ Соmmіttее ruled thаt Port Layola fіеldеd аn іnеlіgіblе рlауеr in their 2–1 away win аgаіnѕt Verdes оn 29 January 2023. A 3–0 victory was subsequently awarded to Verdes. In addition, the goals scored from this game were annulled, meaning Michael Palacio and Gilroy Thurton from Port Layola and Marco Zavala from Verdes lose a goal each.

Internacional FC forfeited their game against San Pedro Pirates, scheduled for 18 March 2023 at the Ambergris Stadium. The Pirates were awarded a 3–0 victory.

Verdes were also originally awarded a 3–0 victory for their away game against San Pedro Pirates, scheduled for 8 April 2023. This was due to the Pirates failing to provide post-game accommodation to the Belize City based referees, even though the Pirates advised earlier in the week that accommodation was not available. San Pedro Pirates subsequently threatened to withdraw from the league, however a few days later decided to continue participating for the remainder of the closing season, as their prospective withdrawal would affect other teams financially. After a successful appeal by the Pirates, this game was played on 14 May 2023.

=== League table ===
Pos	Team	Pld	W	D	L	GF	GA	GD	Pts	Qualification or relegation
1	Verdes	14	9	3	2	30	8	+22	30	Advance to Playoffs
2	San Pedro Pirates	14	7	5	2	33	17	+16	26	Advance to Playoffs
3	Port Layola	14	7	4	3	25	14	+11	25	Advance to Playoffs
4	Progresso	14	6	5	3	22	9	+13	23	Advance to Playoffs
5	Altitude	14	6	4	4	26	15	+11	22	
6	Benque Viejo United	14	6	3	5	19	18	+1	21	
7	Wagiya	14	2	0	12	13	54	−41	6	
8	Internacional FC	14	0	2	12	7	40	−33	2	

Source: Soccerway
Rules for classification: 1) points; 2) goal difference; 3) number of goals scored.

=== Results ===
Home \ Away	ALT	BEN	INT	POR	PRO	SPE	VER	WAG
Altitude		0–1	3–0	0–2	1–2	2–2	1–0	3–1
Benque Viejo United	1–2		2–1	1–1	0–2	2–3	0–1	5–1
Internacional FC	0–6	2–3		1–3	0–0	0–6	0–0	1–2
Port Layola	1–1	0–1	2–0		0–0	2–2	0–2	6–2
Progresso	0–0	3–0	2–0	1–2		0–0	2–2	2–0
San Pedro Pirates	2–2	1–1	3–0	0–1	2–0		0–3	4–2
Verdes	3–0	0–0	5–0	3–0	2–0	2–4		4–0
Wagiya	0–5	1–2	3–2	0–5	0–8	0–4	1–3	

Source: Soccerway
Legend: Blue = home team win; Yellow = draw; Red = away team win.

=== Playoffs ===
Semifinals
1	Verdes	1	3	4
4	Progresso	2	1	3
2	San Pedro Pirates	1	4	5
3	Port Layola	2	0	2

Finals
1	Verdes	1	2	3
2	San Pedro Pirates	0	1	1

==== Semifinals ====
Game One

17 May 2023	Port Layola	2 – 1	San Pedro Pirates	Marion Jones Sports Complex, Belize City
19:30	Latrelle Middleton 10', 55'		Trevor Lennan 65'

17 May 2023	Progresso	2 – 1	Verdes	Orange Walk People's Stadium, Orange Walk
19:30	Marlon Gutierrez 61'; Zamir Bonilla 90+4'		Darrel Myvett 83'

Game Two

21 May 2023	Verdes	3 – 1 (4 – 3 agg.)	Progresso	Norman Broaster Stadium, San Ignacio
16:00	Joel Burgos 18'; Nicolas Rocha Gomez 47'; Jordy Polanco 87'		Jonard Castillo 86'

21 May 2023	San Pedro Pirates	4 – 0 (5 – 2 agg.)	Port Layola	Ambergris Stadium, San Pedro
18:00	Ander Chi 44', 65'; Luis Valdez 45+4' (pen.), 50'

==== Finals ====
Game One

24 May 2023	San Pedro Pirates	0 – 1	Verdes	Ambergris Stadium, San Pedro
18:30			Christian Ramirez 90+'

Game Two

28 May 2023	Verdes	2 – 1 (3 – 1 agg.)	San Pedro Pirates	Norman Broaster Stadium, San Ignacio
15:30	Marco Zavala; Jeromy James 90+'		Horace Avila 56'

=== Season statistics ===
==== Top scorers ====
Rank	Player	Team	Goals^{*}
1	(Belize) Horace Avila	San Pedro Pirates	9
2	(Belize) Jonard Castillo	Progresso	8
2	(Belize) Michael Palacio	Port Layola	8
4	(Belize) Daniel Jimenez	Benque Viejo United	7
4	(Belize) Latrelle Middleton	Port Layola	7
4	(Colombia) Andres Orozco	Altitude	7
7	(Belize) Ander Chi	San Pedro Pirates	6
7	(Belize) Gilroy Thurton	Port Layola	6
7	(Belize) Luis Valdez	San Pedro Pirates	6
10	(Belize) Leston Garcia	Wagiya	5
10	(Argentina) Facundo Garnier	San Pedro Pirates	5
10	(Uruguay) Nicolas Rocha Gomez	Verdes	5
10	(Belize) Sean Young	Port Layola	5

^{*} Includes playoff goals.

==== Hat-tricks ====
Player	For	Against	Result	Date
(Belize) Horace Avila	San Pedro Pirates	Verdes	4–2 (A)	12 February 2023
(Belize) Jonard Castillo^{4}	Progresso	Wagiya	8–0 (A)	9 April 2023
(Colombia) Andres Orozco	Altitude	Internacional FC	6–0 (A)	15 April 2023

Notes

^{4} Player scored 4 goals
