= Krisean Lopez =

Belizean footballer (born 1998)

Personal information
- Full name: Krisean Kyle Lopez
- Date of birth: 2 November 1998 (age 28)
- Place of birth: Belize City, Belize
- Height: 1.62 m (5 ft 4 in)
- Positions: Forward; midfielder

Team information
- Current team: Verdes
- Number: 25

Senior career*
Years	Team	Apps	(Gls)
2017–2018	Wagiya		
2018–	Verdes		
2022–2023	→ C.D. Platense (loan)	16	(3)

International career^{‡}
2018–	Belize	26	(3)
- * Club domestic league appearances and goals ‡ National team caps and goals as of 18:43, 25 March 2024 (UTC)

Krisean Kyle Lopez (born 2 November 1998) is a Belizean association footballer who currently plays for Premier League of Belize club Verdes FC and the Belize national team.

== Club career ==
Following the 2017–18 Opening Season, Lopez was named the league's best new young player as part of Wagiya FC. Prior to the start of the Closing Season, he moved to league rivals Verdes FC.

Lopez traveled to the United States to spend pre-season with Indy Eleven of the USL Championship. In April 2021, he returned to the country to trial with EFA Metro of the United Premier Soccer League despite being under contract with Verdes FC until June 2022. Although he went with the approval of the club and the club would support a transfer beneficial to Lopez's development, Verdes FC was unhappy about how former national team head coach Richard Orlowski contacted the players directly. In December of that year, Lopez won the league's most valuable player award as the league's joint top goal scorer.

Lopez went out on loan from Verdes FC in December 2022, joining C.D. Platense of El Salvador's Primera División. Platense became interested in the player after the club played Verdes in the 2022 CONCACAF League. Lopez made his debut for Platense in a pre-season friendly against Juventud Independiente in early January 2023. In total, he played six pre-season matches for the club and missed another through injury. He would miss the opening match of the Clausura 2023 because his transfer paperwork was delayed. Lopez was eventually cleared to play in the club's second match. He went on to make his official league debut on 3 February 2023 against C.D. Luis Ángel Firpo. He scored his first goal for the club in a 3–2 victory over Atlético Marte on 26 February.

== International career ==
Lopez made his senior international debut on 3 June 2018 in a 0–0 draw away to Barbados.

=== International goals ===
Scores and results list Belize's goal tally first.

No.	Date	Venue	Opponent	Score	Result	Competition
1	4 August 2018	Ambergris Stadium, San Pedro Town, Belize	Barbados	1–0	1–0	Friendly
2	7 September 2018	Isidoro Beaton Stadium, Belmopan, Belize	Bahamas	3–0	4–0	2019–20 CONCACAF Nations League qualifying
3	7 September 2018	Isidoro Beaton Stadium, Belmopan, Belize	Bahamas	4–0	4–0	2019–20 CONCACAF Nations League qualifying
Last updated 27 March 2024

=== International career statistics ===
As of match played 24 March 2024.

Belize national team
2018	5	3
2019	5	0
2020	0	0
2021	3	0
2022	7	0
2023	4	0
2024	2	0
Total	26	3
