= Santa Elena Sporting Complex =

Football stadium in Belize

Coordinates: 17.16595°N 89.06204°W

Santa Elena Sporting Complex is a football stadium based in Santa Elena, Cayo, Belize. It is home to Verdes, who compete in the Premier League of Belize. Since 2018 Verdes have been using the stadium along with their usual home, Norman Broaster Stadium in San Ignacio.

The stadium went under renovation and was reopened in 2016, with an inaugural game between Verdes and Belmopan Bandits on 27 November 2016. The cost of the renovation is reported to be 2.5 million dollars.
