= Premier League of Belize =

Belizean association football league

- Founded: 28 December 2011; 14 years ago
- Country: Belize
- Confederation: CONCACAF
- Number of clubs: 7
- Level on pyramid: 1
- International cup(s): Regional; CONCACAF Central American Cup; Continental; CONCACAF Champions Cup
- Current champions: Verdes (2025–26)
- Most championships: Belmopan Bandits (9)
- Website: plbd1.com//
- Current: 2025–26 Premier League of Belize

The Premier League of Belize is the highest competitive football league in Belize. It was founded on 28 December 2011 after the merger between the Belize Premier Football League and the Super League of Belize. League games usually take place in front of dozens of spectators.

== History ==
Former logo used by Premier League of Belize

The formation of the league was a combination of Belize's suspension by FIFA and the Belize Premier Football League withdrawing from the Football Federation of Belize. It was decided that a brand new top league was to be formed, the winner of which would represent Belize in the CONCACAF Champions League.

Due to the uncertainty of the COVID-19 pandemic, the 2019–20 Premier League of Belize closing season was cancelled after the eighth round of games and a winner was not crowned.

The Premier League of Belize (PLB) was suspended from administering the 2021–22 season by the Football Federation of Belize (FFB). The FFB administered the highest competitive football league in the country for this season, and sanctioned the 2021–22 FFB Top League. The PLB returned for the 2022–23 season.

== Officials ==
On 6 January 2012 the current president of the league was announced as Jaime O. Perdomo Jr, the vice-president as Al Westby and the members being Celso Carcamo, Wilhelm Miguel and Onan McLean.

After election problems had left the league inactive for the whole of the 2021–22 season, on 2 June 2022 the league elected a new Executive in preparation for the 2022–23 season. Ian Haylock was elected as president, with Godfrey Arzu as vice-president. Also elected were Karol Maldonado Claro, as Female Executive Member and Lorin Frazer and Jordan Zabaneh, as Executive Members.

== Current Teams (2022–23 Closing Season) ==
Location of 2022–23 teams in Premier League of Belize

Team	City	Stadium	Capacity
Altitude F.C.	Independence	Michael Ashcroft Stadium	2,000
Belmopan Bandits	Belmopan	Isidoro Beaton Stadium	2,500
Benque Viejo United F.C.	Benque	Marshalleck Stadium	2,000
Port Layola F.C.	Belize City	MCC Grounds	2,000
Progresso F.C.	Orange Walk	Orange Walk People's Stadium	4,500
San Pedro Pirates F.C.	San Pedro	Ambergris Stadium	1,500
Verdes F.C.	San Ignacio	Norman Broaster Stadium	2,000
Wagiya S.C.	Dangriga	Carl Ramos Stadium	3,500

== League champions ==
Season	Champions	Runners-up
2012	Placencia Assassins	Police United
2012–13 O	Belmopan Bandits	Police United
2012–13 C	Police United	FC Belize
2013–14 O	Belmopan Bandits	FC Belize
2013–14 C	Belmopan Bandits	Police United
2014–15 O	Belmopan Bandits	Police United
2014–15 C	Verdes	Belmopan Bandits
2015–16 O	Police United	Verdes
2015–16 C	Belmopan Bandits	Placencia Assassins
2016–17 O	Belmopan Bandits	Belize Defence Force
2016–17 C	Belmopan Bandits	Verdes
2017–18 O	Verdes	Belmopan Bandits
2017–18 C	Belmopan Bandits	Belize Defence Force
2018–19 O	Belmopan Bandits	Verdes
2018–19 C	San Pedro Pirates	Belmopan Bandits
2019–20 O	Verdes	Belmopan Bandits
2019–20 C	Abandoned due to COVID-19 pandemic	
2022–23 O	Altitude	Verdes
2022–23 C	Verdes	San Pedro Pirates
2023–24 O	Altitude	Port Layola F.C.
2023–24 C	Port Layola F.C.	Verdes
2024–25 O	Port Layola F.C.	San Pedro Pirates
2024–25 C	Verdes	San Pedro Pirates
2025–26 O	Verdes	Progresso
2025–26 C	Verdes	Progresso

== Titles by team ==
Team	Champions	Runners-up
Belmopan Bandits	9	4
Verdes	7	5
Police United	2	4
Port Layola F.C.	2	1
Altitude	2	0
San Pedro Pirates	1	3
Placencia Assassins	1	1
Belize Defence Force	0	2
FC Belize	0	2
Progresso	0	2

== Awards ==
=== Top scorers ===
Season	Player	Team	Goals^{*}
2012	(Belize) Jesse Smith	San Pedro Seadogs	8
2012–13 O	(Belize) Daniel Jimenez	Police United	13
2012–13 C	(Belize) Jeromy James	Belmopan Bandits	9
2012–13 C	(Belize) Deon McCaulay	Belmopan Bandits	9
2013–14 O	(Belize) Deon McCaulay	Belmopan Bandits	13
2013–14 C	(Belize) Clifton West	Police United	7
2014–15 O	(Belize) Harrison Roches	Police United	10
2014–15 C	(Belize) Jarret Davis	Verdes	10
2015–16 O	(Belize) Deon McCaulay	Verdes	10
2015–16 C	(Belize) Devon Makin	Police United	6
2016–17 O	(Honduras) Jairo Rochez	Belmopan Bandits	14
2016–17 C	(Belize) Daniel Jimenez	Police United	10
2016–17 C	(Honduras) Jairo Rochez	Belmopan Bandits	10
2017–18 O	(Honduras) Georgie Welcome	Belmopan Bandits	18
2017–18 C	(Belize) Trimayne Harris	Belize Defence Force	13
2018–19 O	(Honduras) Georgie Welcome	Belmopan Bandits	17
2018–19 C	(Belize) Elroy Smith	Verdes	11
2019–20 O	(Mexico) Mariano Landero	Verdes	14
2019–20 C	Abandoned		
2022–23 O	(Colombia) Andres Orozco	Altitude	11
2022–23 C	(Belize) Horace Avila	San Pedro Pirates	9

^{*} Includes playoff goals.

=== MVP (Regular Season) ===
Season	Player	Team
2012	Not awarded	
2012–13 O	(Belize) Woodrow West	Belmopan Bandits
2012–13 C	(Belize) Glenford Chimilio	FC Belize
2013–14 O	(Belize) Franz Vernon	Paradise/Freedom Fighters
2013–14 C	(Belize) Keith Allen	Police United
2014–15 O	(Belize) Rodney Pacheco	Verdes
2014–15 C	(Belize) Rodney Pacheco	Verdes
2015–16 O	(Belize) Luis Torres	Placencia Assassins
2015–16 C	(Belize) Dalton Eiley	Placencia Assassins
2016–17 O	(Belize) Shane Orio	Belmopan Bandits
2016–17 C	(Belize) Daniel Jimenez	Police United
2017–18 O	(Honduras) Georgie Welcome	Belmopan Bandits
2017–18 C	(Belize) Trimayne Harris	Belize Defence Force
2018–19 O	(Honduras) Georgie Welcome	Belmopan Bandits
2018–19 C	(Honduras) Georgie Welcome	Belmopan Bandits
2019–20 O	(Mexico) Edwin Villeda	Verdes
2019–20 C	Abandoned	

=== Best Young Player ===
Season	Player	Team
2012	Not awarded	
2012–13 O	(Belize) Eduardo Gongora	Verdes
2012–13 C	(Belize) Carlton Thomas	FC Belize
2013–14 O	Not awarded	
2013–14 C	Not awarded	
2014–15 O	Not awarded	
2014–15 C	Not awarded	
2015–16 O	(Belize) Darren Myers	Police United
2015–16 C	(Belize) Jordy Polanco	Belmopan Bandits
2016–17 O	(Belize) Jaren Lambey	Freedom Fighters
2016–17 C	(Belize) Rene Leslie	Placencia Assassins
2017–18 O	(Belize) Krisean Lopez	Wagiya
2017–18 C	(Belize) Jonard Castillo	Wagiya
2018–19 O	(Belize) Krisean Lopez	Verdes
2018–19 C	(Belize) Warren Moss	Wagiya
2019–20 O	(Belize) Jesse August	Belize Defence Force
2019–20 C	Abandoned	

=== Best Coach ===
Season	Player	Team
2012	Not awarded	
2012–13 O	(Belize) Edmund Pandy Sr.	Belmopan Bandits
2012–13 C	(Belize) Marvin Ottley	FC Belize
2013–14 O	(Honduras) Pablo Cacho	Verdes
2013–14 C	(Belize) Hilberto Muschamp	Police United
2014–15 O	Not awarded	
2014–15 C	Not awarded	
2015–16 O	(Belize) Hilberto Muschamp	Police United
2015–16 C	(Belize) Robert Muschamp	Placencia Assassins
2016–17 O	(Belize) Kent Gabourel	Belmopan Bandits
2016–17 C	(Belize) Marvin Ottley	Verdes
2017–18 O	(Belize) Marvin Ottley	Verdes
2017–18 C	(Belize) Kent Gabourel	Belmopan Bandits
2018–19 O	(Belize) Kent Gabourel	Belmopan Bandits
2018–19 C	(Brazil) Jorge Nunez	San Pedro Pirates
2019–20 O	(Peru) Cesar Martin Dall'Orso	Verdes
2019–20 C	Abandoned	

== Top 5 all-time scorers ==
Rank	Player	Team(s)	Goals^{*}
1	(Belize) Daniel Jimenez	Belize Defence Force; Belmopan Bandits; Police United	73
2	(Belize) Jarret Davis	FC Belize; Verdes	71
3	(Belize) Jeromy James	Belmopan Bandits; FC Belize; Verdes	69
4	(Belize) Alexander Peters	Freedom Fighters; Placencia Assassins	58
5	(Honduras) Georgie Welcome	Belmopan Bandits	53

^{*} Includes play-off goals.

== Women's League ==
Season	Player	Team	Goals
2024	Khalydia Velasquez	Jewel Fury	23
