= Altitude FC =

Altitude FC may refer to:

- Altitude FC (Belize), a Belizean football team
- Altitude FC (Canada), a Canadian soccer team

See also:

- Placencia Assassins FC (Belize), a Belizean football team who formed a one-year merger with the Belizean Altitude FC and competed as Altitude Assassins FC
