= Denmark Casey Jr. =

Belizean footballer (born 1994)

Personal information
- Full name: Denmark Raymond Casey Jr.
- Date of birth: 14 January 1994 (age 32)
- Place of birth: Belmopan, Belize
- Position: Midfielder

Team information
- Current team: Verdes

Senior career*
Years	Team	Apps	(Gls)
2010–2012	Belize Defence Force		
2012–2017	Belmopan Bandits		
2017–	Verdes		

International career^{‡}
2014–	Belize	18	(1)
- * Club domestic league appearances and goals as of 21 October 2018 ‡ National team caps and goals as of 16 November 2018

Denmark Casey Jr. is a Belizean footballer who currently plays for Verdes in the Premier League of Belize and the Belize national team.

== International career ==
Casey Jr. made his national team debut for Belize on 4 September 2014 in a 2–0 loss against Honduras.

=== International goals ===
Scores and results list Belize's goal tally first.

No.	Date	Venue	Opponent	Score	Result	Competition
1.	16 November 2018	Isidoro Beaton Stadium, Belmopan, Belize	Puerto Rico	1–0	1–0	2019–20 CONCACAF Nations League qualification
