= Victor Mejia =

Belizean footballer (born 1993)

Personal information
- Date of birth: 10 April 1993 (age 33)
- Position: Defender

Team information
- Current team: Verdes FC

Senior career*
Years	Team	Apps	(Gls)
2018–	Verdes FC		

International career^{‡}
2018–	Belize	5	(0)
- * Club domestic league appearances and goals as of 08:33, 11 April 2019 (UTC) ‡ National team caps and goals as of 08:33, 11 April 2019 (UTC)

Victor Mejia (born 10 April 1993) is a Belizean international footballer who plays for Verdes FC, as a defender.

== Career ==
He has played club football for Verdes FC.

He made his international debut for Belize in 2018.
