= San Pedro Pirates FC =

Belizean association football club

San Pedro Pirates
- Full name: San Pedro Pirates Football Club
- Nickname(s): The Pirates
- Founded: 2017
- Ground: Ambergris Stadium; San Pedro Town, Belize
- Capacity: 1,500
- Chairman: Emiliano Rivera
- Manager: Ada Cordova
- League: Premier League of Belize
- 2022–23: 3rd (Opening Season)
- Website: facebook.com/sanpedropiratesfc

San Pedro Pirates Football Club is a Belizean football team that competes in the Premier League of Belize (PLB). The team is based in San Pedro Town and plays home matches at Ambergris Stadium.

== History ==
San Pedro Pirates FC joined the PLB for the 2017–18 season. They won their first PLB championship in the 2018–19 closing season, defeating the Belmopan Bandits, who were defending champions. Head coach Tony Maldonado was named the season's Best Manager. Following the 2022–23 season, the club was reportedly set to be sold to a foreign investor with big ambitions, such as winning the CONCACAF League. However, the deal fell through. The current ownership group then requested permission from the league to sit out the following season to rebuild and restructure the club. The club made the official announcement that it would not be participating on social media on July 3, 2023.

== Year-by-year ==
Key

Champion Runners-up Third place

Season	League																	Notes
Season	Div.	Round	Pos.	Pl.	W	D	L	Pts.	Play-Offs	Round	Pos.	Pl.	W	D	L	Pts.	Play-Offs	Notes
2017/18	Opening	4th	14	6	2	6	20	Semis	Closing	6th	13	5	0	8	16	DNQ		
2018/19	Opening	3rd	14	7	1	6	22	Semis	Closing	1st	14	8	2	4	26	1st		
2019/20	Opening	3rd	14	5	8	1	23	Semis	Closing	3rd	8	3	3	2	12	N/A		Closing Round abandoned because of COVID-19 pandemic
2021/22	Opening	3rd	10	4	3	3	15	N/A	Closing	3rd	10	5	2	3	17	N/A		
2022/23	Opening	3rd	14	6	5	3	23	Semis	Closing	2nd	14	7	5	2	26	2nd		
2023/24	Did not enter																	
