= 2015–16 Premier League (disambiguation) =

2015–16 Premier League may refer to a number of professional sports league seasons:

Basketball

- 2015–16 Icelandic Premier League
- 2015–16 Irish Premier League season

Association football

- 2015–16 Armenian Premier League
- 2015–16 Azerbaijan Premier League
- 2015–16 Premier League of Belize
- 2015–16 Premier League of Bosnia and Herzegovina
- 2015–16 Egyptian Premier League
- 2015–16 Premier League (England)
  - 2015–16 Premier League International Cup
- 2015–16 Hong Kong Premier League
- 2015–16 Israeli Premier League
- 2015–16 Kuwaiti Premier League
- 2015–16 Lebanese Premier League
- 2015–16 Maltese Premier League
- 2015–16 National Premier League (Jamaica)
- 2015–16 Premier Soccer League (South Africa)
- 2015–16 Russian Premier League
- 2015–16 Syrian Premier League
- 2015–16 Tanzanian Premier League
- 2015–16 Ukrainian Premier League
- 2015–16 Welsh Premier League

Cricket

- 2015–16 Bangladesh Premier League
- 2015–16 Premier League Tournament (Sri Lanka)
