= Martín Dall'Orso =

Peruvian footballer (born 1966)

Personal information
- Date of birth: 1 September 1966 (age 60)
- Place of birth: Callao, Peru

Senior career*
Years	Team	Apps	(Gls)
- Nacional
- Estrella Toja
- Yurimaguas
1986	Deportivo Camaná		
1987	Sporting Cristal		
1987	Esther Grande de Bentin		
1988	UTC		
1989-1991	Sporting Cristal		
1991	Alianza Atlético		
1992	León de Huánuco		
1992	Ovación Sipesa		
1993	Deportivo Sipesa		
1993-1994	Querétaro		
1994	Universitario		
1995	Tecos UAG		
1995	Sport Boys		
1996	Tecos UAG		
1996	San Luis Potosí		
1997	Cartaginés		
1998	Vanguard Huandao		
1999	CD Águila		
2000	New Jersey Stallions		
2000-2001	CSD Xelajú MC		
2006	CD UCV		

International career
1989–1994	Peru	8	(1)

Managerial career
- 2006: Universidad César Vallejo
- 2013: Unión Fuerza Minera
- 2013: Carlos A. Mannucci
- 2014: José Gálvez FBC (assistant)
- 2016: Unión Tarapoto (assistant)
- 2018: Santos FC
- 2019–2020: Verdes FC
- 2022: Deportivo Llacuabamba
- 2023: Benque Viejo United FC
- 2025: Juventud Santo Domingo
- 2025: Santos FC
- 2026–: Belize
- * Club domestic league appearances and goals

Martín Dall'Orso (born 1 September 1966) is a Peruvian football coach and former player. He played in eight matches for the Peru national football team from 1989 to 1994. He was also part of Peru's squad for the 1989 Copa América tournament.

He is currently the coach of the Belizean national team.
