= Altitude FC (Belize) =

Belizean football club

- Full name: Altitude Football Club
- Nickname(s): The A Team AFC
- Founded: 2013
- Ground: Michael Ashcroft Stadium; Independence, Belize
- Capacity: 2,500
- Owner: Jordan Zabaneh
- Chairman: Adrian Gonzalez
- Manager: Wilmer Garcia
- League: Premier League of Belize
- 2022–23: Champions (Opening Season)
- Website: www.fcaltitude.com
| Home colours | Away colours |

Altitude FC is a football club based in Independence, Belize. Their semi-professional male team competes in the Premier League of Belize, the highest level of football in the country; their female team, named the Altitude Chicks, compete in the National Amateur Women's League (NAWL). They play their home matches at Michael Ashcroft Stadium in downtown Independence. Altitude FC was founded in 2013 and represents the Mid-South Football Association from the Stann Creek District.

== History ==
Altitude FC was founded in 2013 as a 1st division football club. During their first year, they competed in the Ferguson Cup, an amateur tournament that was held in Placencia. They then competed in the 1st division Banana League tournament. They won a championship in 2018 against Sagitun Farm 8.

Following a lease asgreement with the Placencia Assassins, an existing Premier League of Belize (PLB) franchise from the same region, Altitude FC competed in the 2018–19 season as the Altitude Assassins. After completing a year as Altitude Assassins, the lease with the Placencia Assassins was terminated and they regained their PLB franchise.

In 2019, Altitude FC entered the PLB as a provisional franchise, placing fourth in the 2019–20 Opening Season. In 2020, Altitude was officially inducted in the PLB and given full membership. The season was suspended due to the COVID-19 pandemic and replaced with the FFB Top League, a temporary league organized by the Football Federation of Belize. Altitude finished as runners-up in both seasons of the FFB Top League behind Verdes FC.

The PLB resumed for the 2022–23 season and Altitude won the opening season playoffs against Verdes. The match was tied 1–1 following regulation and extra time and was decided in a penalty shoot-out that ended 11–10.

== Stadium ==
Michael Ashcroft Stadium was built in 1994 as a multipurpose sporting complex in Independence, Belize. It has been host to a number of amateur and semi-professional football clubs over the years, including Sagitun FC, Texmar Boys, and the Placencia Assassins. In 2018, Altitude FC moved to Michael Ashcroft Stadium, which has a seating capacity of 2,500 and is managed by the Independence Sports & Stadium Committee under the Independence Village Council.

== Logo ==
As of 2020, the club crest for Altitude is a blue shield with yellow stripes. It features the club's name as well as the Belize coat of arms. The yellow stripes represent the region's banana industry.

== Current squad ==
Note: Flags indicate national team as defined under FIFA eligibility rules; some limited exceptions apply. Players may hold more than one non-FIFA nationality.

| No. | Pos. | Nation | Player |
|---|---|---|---|
| 1 | GK | (Colombia) COL | Oscar Palomino |
| 2 | DF | (Belize) BLZ | Kendale Butler |
| 3 | DF | (Belize) BLZ | Elroy Coe |
| 4 | DF | (Belize) BLZ | Aldin Forman |
| 5 | DF | (Belize) BLZ | Allan Barillas |
| 6 | FW | (Colombia) COL | Andres Orozco |
| 7 | MF | (Belize) BLZ | Rene Leslie |
| 8 | FW | (Belize) BLZ | Jardehl Muschamp |
| 9 | FW | (Colombia) COL | Miguel Garcia |
| 10 | MF | (Belize) BLZ | Dellon Torres |
| 11 | MF | (Belize) BLZ | Luis Torres |
| 12 | DF | (Belize) BLZ | James Mejia |
| 13 | DF | (Belize) BLZ | Jose Urbina |

| No. | Pos. | Nation | Player |
|---|---|---|---|
| 14 | MF | (Belize) BLZ | Marvin Tzalam |
| 15 | MF | (Colombia) COL | Adrian Gutierrez |
| 16 | DF | (Belize) BLZ | Ashley Torres |
| 18 | MF | (Belize) BLZ | Gabriel Ramos Jr. |
| 19 | MF | (Belize) BLZ | Jeffton Apolonio |
| 20 | MF | (Colombia) COL | Ronaldo Vergara |
| 21 | MF | (Belize) BLZ | Zerick Cabral |
| 22 | GK | (Belize) BLZ | Devin Longsworth |
| 23 | DF | (Belize) BLZ | Dalton Eiley |
| 29 | MF | (Belize) BLZ | Ashton Torres |
| 70 | FW | (Belize) BLZ | Collin Westby |
| 99 | FW | (Belize) BLZ | Jonard Castillo |

== Management ==
| Name | Role |
|---|---|
| (Belize) Jordan Zabaneh | Owner/CEO |
| (Belize) Adrian Gonzales | General Manager/Team Physician |
| (Belize) Enrique Zabaneh | Assistant manager |
| (Belize) Warren Brooks | Accountant |
| (Belize) Wilmer Garcia | Head coach |
| (Belize) Gabriel Ramos | Goalkeeper coach |

== List of managers ==
- Wilmer Garcia (2021-) Football Federation of Belize
- Hilberto Muschamp (2020-2021) Premier League of Belize
- Hilberto Muschamp (2019-2020) Premier League of Belize
- (Mexico) Renan Couoh (2019-2019) Premier League of Belize
- Wilmer Garcia (2018-2019) Premier League of Belize
- (Belize) Gabriel Ramos (2017-2018) ISSC Banana League
- (Belize) Devin Longsworth (2016-2017) ISSC Banana League
- (Belize) Robbie Cadle (2015-2016) ISSC Banana League
- (Belize) Robbie Cadle (2014-2015) ISSC Banana League
- (Belize) John King Sr. (2013-2014) Rodwell Ferguson Cup
