= Elroy Smith =

Belizean footballer (born 1981)

Personal information
- Full name: Elroy Alexander Smith
- Date of birth: November 30, 1981 (age 44)
- Place of birth: Belize
- Position: Defender

Team information
- Current team: Deportes Savio
- Number: 6

Senior career*
Years	Team	Apps	(Gls)
2002–2003	Valley Pride		
2004–2005	Print Belize		
2005–2006	New Site Erei		
2006–2007	Wagiya		
2007	Deportes Savio	59	(13)
2007	Marathón		
2008–2011	Deportes Savio		
2012–2013	Vida	20	(3)
2013–2015	Platense		
2015–2017	Belmopan Bandits		
2018-	Verdes FC		

International career^{‡}
2004–	Belize	61	(6)
- * Club domestic league appearances and goals as of 22 January 2017 ‡ National team caps and goals as of 17 November 2019

Elroy Alexander Smith (born 30 November 1981) is a Belizean football defender who plays for Belmopan Bandits, having previously played for several clubs in Liga Nacional de Honduras.

== International career ==
Smith made his debut for Belize in a June 2004, FIFA World Cup qualification match against Canada and has, as of July 2011, earned 16 caps, playing in 7 World Cup qualifiers.

== Career statistics ==
=== Club ===
Team	Season	Games	Start	Sub	Goal	YC	RC
Deportes Savio	2007-08 C	12	12	0	0	1	0
Deportes Savio	2008-09 A	15	13	2	1	2	0
Deportes Savio	2008-09 C	14	14	0	1	1	1
Deportes Savio	2009-10 A	18	18	0	2	2	1

=== International ===
Scores and results list Belize's goal tally first.

No.	Date	Venue	Opponent	Score	Result	Competition
1.	26 March 2008	Warner Park, Basseterre, Saint Kitts and Nevis	Saint Kitts and Nevis	1–0	1–1	2010 FIFA World Cup qualification
2.	16 January 2011	Estadio Rommel Fernández, Panama City, Panama	El Salvador	1–2	2–5	2011 Copa Centroamericana
3.	20 January 2017	Estadio Rommel Fernández, Panama City, Panama	Nicaragua	1–1	1–3	2017 Copa Centroamericana
4.	22 March 2018	Isidoro Beaton Stadium, Belmopan, Belize	Grenada	3–1	4–2	Friendly
5.	22 March 2018	Isidoro Beaton Stadium, Belmopan, Belize	Grenada	4–2	4–2	Friendly
6.	13 October 2019	Warner Park, Basseterre, Saint Kitts and Nevis	Saint Kitts and Nevis	1–0	1–0	2019–20 CONCACAF Nations League B
