= Ambergris Stadium =

Stadium in San Pedro Town, Belize

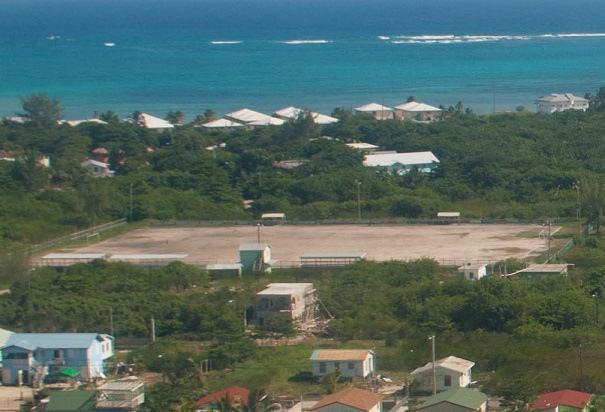
- Ambergris Stadium in 2013, prior to reconstruction
- Interactive map of Ambergris Stadium
- Location: San Pedro Town, Belize
- Capacity: 1,500
- Surface: artificial turf

Construction
- Groundbreaking: September 18, 2015
- Opened: May 21, 2017
- Cost: $2.3mil BZD
- General contractors: AM Construction Co, Ltd.

Tenants
- San Pedro Pirates FC; Belize national team (Select Matches)

Ambergris Stadium is a 1,500-seat association football stadium in San Pedro Town, Belize which meets FIFA international standards. It is the home stadium of San Pedro Pirates FC of the Premier League of Belize

== History ==
By July 2014, the former Ambergris Stadium was in a state of disrepair and unusable despite a multi-million dollar investment. The surface was uneven and prone to flooding. Local authorities began planning for a redevelopment of the site with the design phase expected to be complete by October 2014 with the goal of making it Ambergris Caye's top sporting venue. The objective was to create the facility with a particular emphasis on football. Renovation work was expected by begin by January 2015. The former structure was completely demolished and construction of the new 800-seat, $2.3mil BZD stadium commenced on September 18, 2015 with the construction contract awarded to AM Construction Co, Ltd. of Orange Walk District.

By November 2016, the stadium was expected to be complete by the end of the month or first week of December. Initially, an inauguration ceremony was planned for September 2016. However, the project suffered setbacks pertaining to lighting installation. The project was also delayed because of the decision to install an artificial turf surface which required filling, grading, trenching, and installing the underground drainage system. The synthetic surface would prevent flooding of the pitch during the rainy season. The inauguration ceremony was set for November 26, 2016 and was expected to feature San Pedro Pirates FC taking on UPSL club Real Chutemoc F.C. from Austin, Texas.

Completion was eventually delayed again with the inauguration ceremony finally held on May 21, 2017. Despite delays, the project finished on budget. The final design featured synthetic turf, stage lighting, VIP area/media booth, bleachers to accommodate 1,500 people, concession stands, and locker room and bathroom facilities. The final program for the rescheduled inauguration featured football matches, but the team from the United States did not participate. The biggest match of the day saw San Pedro Pirates FC draw with fellow Premier League club Police United 2–2.

On August 4, 2018 the stadium hosted the Belize national football team in an international friendly against Barbados in preparation for 2019–20 CONCACAF Nations League qualifying. Belize won 1–0 with the match's only goal scored by Krisean Lopez in the 79th minute.
