= Jorge Nunez (football coach) =

Brazilian football coach

Jorge Nunez is a Brazilian football coach. Coaching for a number of teams in Belize, he managed the Belize national football team in 2015.

== Belize National Team ==
Introduced as head coach of the Belize national team for their 2018 FIFA World Cup qualification campaign in 2015, Nunez led the Jaguars to the third round after beating the Dominican Republic 3-0 causing them to go up 37 places in the FIFA Rankings ahead of their next game versus Canada. Despite seeing himself coach Belize for a longer time period, the Brazilian tactician's time as their manager ended by early 2016.
