= Shane Orio =

Belizean footballer (born 1980)

Shane Moody-Orio
Personal information
- Full name: Shane Osburn Moody-Orio
- Date of birth: 7 August 1980 (age 46)
- Place of birth: Corozal, Belize
- Height: 1.87 m (6 ft 1 1/2 in)
- Position: Goalkeeper

Team information
- Current team: Belmopan Bandits
- Number: 1

Senior career*
Years	Team	Apps	(Gls)
1999–2000	Belmopan United		
2000–2002	Kulture Yabra FC	40	(0)
2002–2003	San Pedro Seadogs		
2003–2004	Kulture Yabra FC		
2004–2005	Boca F.C.		
2005–2009	Puntarenas	91	(0)
2009–2010	Ramonense	24	(0)
2010–2013	Marathón	110	(0)
2014–2015	Suchitepéquez	54	(0)
2016	Belmopan Bandits		

International career^{‡}
2000–2019	Belize	31	(0)
- * Club domestic league appearances and goals as of 10 January 2010 ‡ National team caps and goals as of 4 November 2019

Shane Moody-Orio (born 7 August 1980) is a Belizean former professional footballer who played as a goalkeeper. He was a Belize international.

== Club career ==
After playing for several teams in his native Belize, Moody joined Costa Rican side Puntarenas in 2005.

He currently plays with Belmopan Bandits.

== International career ==
He was the first-choice goalie for the Belize national football team, making his debut in 2000 against Guatemala. He took part in the World Cup qualifiers against Saint Kitts and Nevis and later Mexico, receiving some praise as a mature player on a young and very limited team.
