= Michael Ashcroft Stadium =

Stadium in Independence Village, Belize

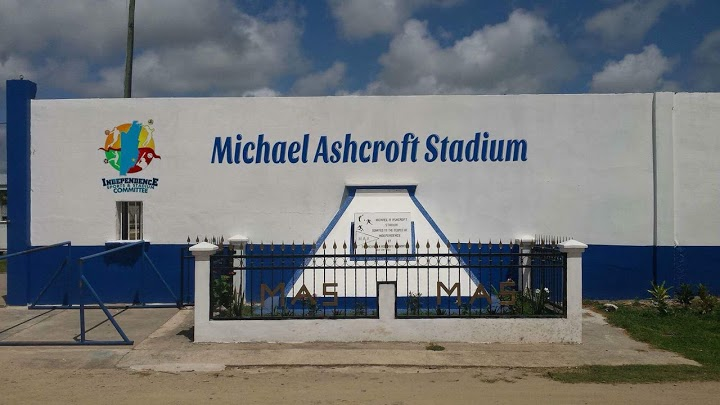
- Interactive map of Michael Ashcroft Stadium
- Location: Independence, Belize
- Coordinates: 16°32′20″N 88°25′2″W
- Capacity: 2,000
- Surface: Grass

Construction
- Opened: 1994; 32 years ago

Tenants
- Boca FC (2003-2004); Altitude FC (present)

Michael Ashcroft Stadium is a multi-purpose stadium in Independence, Belize. It is currently used mostly for football matches and was the home stadium to Boca F.C. and Sagitun Football Club in the Belize Premier Football League (BPFL) of the Football Federation of Belize.

The stadium holds 2,000 people. It currently hosts the Premier League Of Belize's Altitude FC.
