= Valley Pride Freedom Fighters FC =

Belizean football club

Valley Pride Freedom Fighters
- Full name: Valley Pride Freedom Fighters Football Club
- Nickname(s): The Fighters
- Founded: 2008
- Ground: Victor Sanchez Union Field; Punta Gorda
- Capacity: 1,500
- Chairman: Antonio L Barchi D.
- Manager: Santiago Acosta
- League: Premier League of Belize
Home colours	Away colours

Valley Pride Freedom Fighters are a Belizean football team based in Dangriga. They are current member of the Premier League of Belize of the Football Federation of Belize.

== History ==
Old Logo - Paradise Freedom Fighters

The club was founded as Freedom Fighters and in 2015 changed to King Energy/Freedom Fighters . In the Winter 2011/2012 was rebranded as Paradise/Freedom Fighters FC, before the club changed its name to Freedom Fighters in January 2015.

=== Stadium ===
Their home stadium is Victor Sanchez Union Field, Punta Gorda.

== Current squad ==
Note: Flags indicate national team as defined under FIFA eligibility rules; some limited exceptions apply. Players may hold more than one non-FIFA nationality.

No.	Pos.	Nation	Player
1	GK	(Mexico) MEX	Abiran Canul B.
2	DF	(Belize) BLZ	Lucio Coc
3	DF	(Belize) BLZ	Adrian Gonzalez
4	MF	(Belize) BLZ	Darroll Lambey
5	DF	(Belize) BLZ	George Ortega
6	MF	(Belize) BLZ	Vicente Acal
7	DF	(Belize) BLZ	Lionel Cabral
8	MF	(Belize) BLZ	Kenroy Arthurs
9	FW	(Belize) BLZ	Alexander Peters
10	MF	(Belize) BLZ	Lisbey Castillo (captain)
11	MF	(Belize) BLZ	James Logan

No.	Pos.	Nation	Player
13	FW	(Belize) BLZ	Dwayne Sampson
14	MF	(Belize) BLZ	Jevon Aranda
15	MF	(Belize) BLZ	Wilmer Garcia
16	MF	(Belize) BLZ	Jorge Albejo
17	DF	(Belize) BLZ	Josue Moreno
18	MF	(Belize) BLZ	Darwaine Castillo
19	DF	(Belize) BLZ	Onest Martinez
20	DF	(Belize) BLZ	Freddy De LaRosa
22	GK	(Belize) BLZ	Anthony Young
25	GK	(Belize) BLZ	Ricky Muschamp
30	DF	(Belize) BLZ	Mario Morales
