= Belmopan FC =

Association football club in Belize

- Full name: Belmopan Football Club
- Nicknames: The Bandits; Los Banditos
- Founded: 1986; 40 years ago as Belmopan Bandits
- Ground: Isidoro Beaton Stadium, Belmopan
- Capacity: 2,500
- Owner: Cruz Gamez
- Manager: Dale Pelayo Sr.
- League: Premier League of Belize
- 2025–26: 3rd
- Website: https://belmopanfc.com/

Belmopan Football Club is a professional football club from Belmopan, Belize, currently competing in the Premier League of Belize PLB. With nine championships, the club is the most successful in Belizean football since the creation of the Premier League of Belize in 2012.

== History ==
The club was founded in 1986 as the Builders Hardware Bandits. After a period of inactivity, it returned in 2011 and quickly re-established itself as one of the country's top clubs. By 2017, Belmopan Bandits had won seven of the last eleven titles in Belize's top division, including the Premier League of Belize and its predecessor leagues. The club qualified for the 2014–15 CONCACAF Champions League but was ultimately replaced by Costa Rica's C.S. Herediano after the surface of the FFB Stadium was deemed unplayable. If they would have appeared in the tournament, the club would have been the first from Belize to participate in the competition since 2008–09. By winning the 2014–15 championship, the club won the title for the fourth time in six seasons and its third championship in a row. By 2016, the club was recognized by Amandala as having a stable ownership and financial security without scandals or controversies, and a number of members of the Belize national team in the squad.

In July 2017, Belmopan Bandits won the Quadrangular Football Tournament held in San Pedro Town, beating the top teams from Ambergris Caye. Later that summer the club made its CONCACAF debut in the 2017 CONCACAF League, the inaugural edition of the tournament. Honduran international and 2010 FIFA World Cup participant Georgie Welcome led the team's offense. They were eliminated by C.D. Walter Ferretti of Nicaragua in the Round of 16 with an aggregate score of 1–5. The team qualified for the competition again in 2018. In their second attempt, the club was eliminated in the Round of 16 again, losing a well-played series against F.C. Motagua 0–3 on aggregate. By qualifying for the 2019 CONCACAF League, Belmopan Bandits became the first-ever club to qualify for the competition three consecutive seasons.

In October 2021, Belmopan Bandits issued a statement that it would not participate in the 2021–22 FFB Top League which was organized by the Football Federation of Belize to replace the PLB season cancelled because of the ongoing COVID-19 pandemic. The club stated that their protest was because Clifford King, the person club management viewed as the legitimately elected President of the FFB, was not recognized by the federation. The matter was taken up by with the Supreme Court of Belize.

In February 2023, it was announced that the club had entered a sponsorship agreement with Internacional Futbol Club of Mexico which would increase Belmopan's technical and financial resources. As part of the deal, Belmopan Bandits rebranded as Bandits-Internacional FC. While the original club would maintain ownership, Internacional FC would take over all operations and offer opportunities for Belizean players to sign in Mexico. The club played its first match under its new name against Altitude FC on 11 February 2023. Before the end of the 2022–23 season, the club returned to wearing its original Bandits uniforms. In May 2023, it was announced that the club had ended its sponsorship agreement with Internacional FC and would return as the Belmopan Bandits for the 2023–24 season. The half season as played under the Bandits-Internacional FC moniker saw the club earn its worst-ever Closing Championship performance.

On 31 November 2024, it was announced that the club had been sold from John Saldivar to former Football Federation of Belize Vice President Cruz Gamez. In conjunction with the change in ownership, the club was rebranded as Belmopan FC and its color scheme shifted from red to green and yellow. This marked the second color change in club history. After originally wearing blue to align with the colors of original owners, the People's United Party, the color was shifted to red to match Saldivar's political alignment when he took over. At the time, new owner Gamez stated that his goal was to return the club to its glory days after several tough seasons. The club was purchased for an undisclosed amount following lengthy negotiations. Gamez immediately began working on international relationships to strengthen the structure of the club with Alebrijes de Oaxaca of Mexico's Liga de Expansión MX mentioned as a possibility.

In June 2025, after just half a season as owner, it was announced that the club had been sold again to an unknown buyer ahead of the 2025–26 season. The club launched a new crest with the purchase, but kept the yellow and green color scheme.

== Record ==
=== Year-by-year ===
Key

Champion Runners-up Third place

Season	League																	Notes
Season	Div.	Round	Pos.	Pl.	W	D	L	Pts.	Play-Offs	Round	Pos.	Pl.	W	D	L	Pts.	Play-Offs	Notes
2012	1st	Opening	5th, Southern Zone	10	1	4	5	7	DNQ	Closing	1st, Zone A	14	9	4	1	31	1st	
2012–13	1st	Opening	1st, Zone A	14	9	4	1	31	1st	Closing	1st	14	10	2	2	32	Semis	
2013–14	1st	Opening	3rd	12	4	5	3	17	1st	Closing	2nd	12	4	6	2	18	1st	
2014–15	1st	Opening	3rd	8	5	1	2	16	1st	Closing	3rd	8	4	3	1	15	2nd	
2015–16	1st	Opening	1st	10	6	3	1	21	Semis	Closing	3rd	10	5	3	2	18	1st	
2016–17	1st	Opening	1st	16	12	4	0	40	1st	Closing	1st	14	11	3	0	36	1st	
2017–18	1st	Opening	1st	14	11	2	1	35	2nd	Closing	1st	14	9	4	1	31	1st	
2018–19	1st	Opening	1st	14	10	3	1	33	1st	Closing	2nd	14	7	4	3	25	2nd	
2019–20	1st	Opening	2nd	14	8	4	2	28	2nd	Closing	2nd	7	4	1	2	13	N/A	Closing Round abandoned because of COVID-19 pandemic
2021–22	1st	Did not enter																
2022–23	1st	Opening	8th	14	2	2	10	8	DNQ	Closing	8th	14	0	2	12	2	DNQ	
2023–24	1st	Opening	7th	14	2	2	10	8	DNQ	Closing	7th	14	2	2	10	8	DNQ	
2024–25	1st	Opening	6th	10	1	1	8	4	DNQ	Closing	5th	10	3	1	6	7	DNQ	
2025–26	1st	Opening								Closing								

=== International competitions ===
Season	Competition	Round	Opponent	Home	Away	Aggregate
2014–15	CONCACAF Champions League	Group Stage	withdrawn, replaced by (Costa Rica) Herediano			
2017	CONCACAF League	Round of 16	(Nicaragua) Walter Ferretti	1–4	0–3	1–5
2018	CONCACAF League	Round of 16	(Honduras) Motagua	0–1	0–2	0–3
2019	CONCACAF League	Preliminary round	(Costa Rica) Saprissa	1–3	1–3	2–6

== Honours ==
- Belize National Division
  - Runners-up (1):
    - 2000–01
- BPFL Regent Challenge Champions Cup
  - Runners-up (2):
    - 2002–03, 2003
- Premier League of Belize
  - Winners (9)
    - Opening Season: 2012–13, 2013–14, 2014–15, 2016–17, 2018–19
    - Closing Season: 2013–14, 2015–16, 2016–17, 2017–18
  - Runners-up (4)
  - Opening Season: 2017–18, 2019–20
    - Closing Season: 2014–15, 2018–19
- Quadrangular Football Tournament
  - Winners (1)
    - 2017

== Logo history ==
Bandits logo until 2016

Club logo 2016 to November 2024

Logo December 2024 to June 2025

== Basketball ==
Belmopan Bandits is an multi-sports club that also operates a basketball team in the Belize Elite Basketball League (BEBL). The team won its first league championship in 2017.
