= Placencia Assassins FC =

Belizean football club

- Full name: Placencia Assassins Football Club
- Ground: Placencia Football Field; Placencia, Belize
- League: Premier League of Belize
- 2012: 1st

Placencia Assassins Football Club are a football team based in Placencia, Belize. They currently play in the Premier League of Belize. In 2011, they were crowned as Super League of Belize champions.

Their home stadium is Placencia Football Field.

In 2018, they formed an agreement with Altitude FC with their franchise leased was leased for a year, and Altitude's team name was changed to Altitude Assassins, in which they participated in the 2018–19 Premier League of Belize. At the end of the 2018-19 Premier League of Belize Tournament, after completing a year as Altitude Assassins, the lease was terminated and Altitude regained their franchise, and returned to the Premier League of Belize.

== Achievements ==
- Super League of Belize: 1

2011

- Premier League of Belize: 1

2012

== Current squad ==
Note: Flags indicate national team as defined under FIFA eligibility rules; some limited exceptions apply. Players may hold more than one non-FIFA nationality.

No.	Pos.	Nation	Player
1	GK	(Belize) BLZ	Anthony Williams
2	DF	(Belize) BLZ	Wilbert Rivas
10	MF	(Belize) BLZ	Dellon Torres
12	MF	(Belize) BLZ	Marvin Tzalam
14	DF	(Belize) BLZ	Daniel Padilla
15	MF	(Belize) BLZ	Ernie Whyte
16	DF	(Belize) BLZ	Ashley Torres (captain)

No.	Pos.	Nation	Player
17	MF	(Belize) BLZ	Kyle Flowers
20	GK	(Peru) PER	Jose Morales
21	FW	(Belize) BLZ	Victor Franco
23	DF	(Belize) BLZ	Charles Leslie
24	MF	(Belize) BLZ	Zerrick Torres
25	FW	(Belize) BLZ	Rollin Burgess
