= Wagiya SC =

Association football club in Belize

- Full name: Wagiya Sporting Club
- Founded: 1983; 42 years ago
- Ground: Carl Ramos Stadium
- Capacity: 3,500
- League: Premier League of Belize
- 2025: 6th

Wagiya SC is a professional football club from Dangriga, Belize, currently competing in the Premier League of Belize.

== Honours ==
Belize Premier Football League

Runners-Up (1): 2006
