= Georgie Welcome =

Honduran striker (born 1985)

Personal information
- Full name: Georgie Wilson Welcome Collins
- Date of birth: 9 March 1985 (age 41)
- Place of birth: Roatán, Honduras
- Height: 1.82 m (6 ft 0 in)
- Position: Forward

Team information
- Current team: Platense
- Number: 12

Senior career*
Years	Team	Apps	(Gls)
2004–2008	Arsenal	22	(18)
2008–2013	Motagua	111	(39)
2011	→ Monaco (loan)	13	(2)
2011	→ Atlas (loan)	9	(1)
2014	Platense	7	(1)
2014	BEC Tero Sasana	31	(10)
2015	Siam Navy	6	(1)
2015	Mohun Bagan	0	(0)
2016	Platense	1	(1)
2017	Dragón	18	(5)
2017– 2021	Belmopan Bandits		(53)
2021–2023	Juticalpa S.A.D.		
2023-2024	Oro Verde FC		
2025	Parrillas One		
2025–	Platense	9	(3)

International career
2008	Honduras U23	4	(1)
2008–2013	Honduras	33	(4)
Medal record
Honduras
First place	CONCACAF Pre-Olympic Tournament	2008
- * Club domestic league appearances and goals

Georgie Wilson Welcome Collins (born 9 March 1985) is a Honduran professional footballer who plays as a striker for Platense.

Welcome is the only player to debut with the national side playing in the second level of Honduras.

== Club career ==
Welcome started his career at Arsenal FC (Roatan) and was snapped up by Honduran giant F.C. Motagua in 2008.

On 1 August 2010, Welcome travelled to Glasgow to begin a week-long unsuccessful trial with Scottish champions Rangers.

In January 2011, Welcome was sent to AS Monaco on loan from Motagua.

After an unsuccessful stint in Monaco, Welcome was signed by Mexican league club Atlas to a one-year contract. The transfer was announced on 20 June 2011. He then returned to Honduras, where he signed for Marathon ahead of the 2012 Clausura.

In December 2013, Platense confirmed Welcome would join them as their new striker.

In June 2015, Welcome signed with I-League side Mohun Bagan.

== International career ==
A tall, lanky striker, Welcome was part of the Honduran U-23 team that qualified for the 2008 Olympic Games. Because of his goal in the 108th minute of the match, Honduras became CONCACAF Pre-Olympic champions after beating the host country, the United States, 1–0.

He made his debut for the full national side on 22 May 2008 in a friendly against Belize where he scored one of the two goals to win. Welcome scored a magnificent goal for the Honduras national football team in a friendly match against Latvia, a goal that turned out to be the game-winner for the Catrachos.

As of February 2013, he has earned a total of 31 caps, scoring 4 goals. He has represented his country in 4 FIFA World Cup qualification matches and played at the 2011 and 2013 Copa Centroamericana as well as at the 2009 CONCACAF Gold Cup but most prominently, in Honduras' all three games at the 2010 FIFA World Cup.

== Career statistics ==
Scores and results list Honduras' goal tally first.

No	Date	Venue	Opponent	Score	Result	Competition
1.	22 May 2008	Estadio Olímpico Metropolitano, San Pedro Sula, Honduras	Belize	2–0	2–0	Friendly
2.	14 November 2009	Estadio Tiburcio Carías Andino, Tegucigalpa, Honduras	Latvia	2–1	2–1	Friendly
3.	27 May 2010	Villach Lind, Villach, Austria	Belarus	2–2	2–2	Friendly
4.	12 October 2010	Los Angeles Memorial Coliseum, Los Angeles, United States	Guatemala	2–0	2–0	Friendly

== Honours ==
Arsenal

- 2006–07 Clausura (2nd level)

Honduras

- 2008 CONCACAF U-23
