= Police United FC (Belize) =

Association football club in Belize

Police United
- Full name: Police United Football Club
- Founded: 2012
- Ground: Isidoro Beaton Stadium; Belmopan, Belize
- Capacity: 2,500
- Manager: Charlie Slusher
- League: Premier League of Belize

Police United FC is a Belizean football team which currently competes in the Premier League of Belize.

The team is based in Belmopan. Their home stadium is Isidoro Beaton Stadium. Part of the team are made up of police officers from Belize.

From the 2022–23 Premier League of Belize, Benque Viejo United have played under the license of Police United.

== Current squad ==
Note: Flags indicate national team as defined under FIFA eligibility rules; some limited exceptions apply. Players may hold more than one non-FIFA nationality.

| No. | Pos. | Nation | Player |
|---|---|---|---|
| 1 | GK | BRA | Joel Santana |
| 3 | DF | BLZ | Jermain Jones |
| 4 | DF | BLZ | Asrel Sutherland |
| 6 | MF | BRA | Rafael Suarez |
| 7 | MF | BLZ | John King |
| 8 | FW | BLZ | Carlton Thomas |
| 9 | FW | BLZ | Lennox Castillo |
| 10 | MF | BLZ | Harrison Róchez |
| 11 | MF | BLZ | Byron Chávez |
| 12 | DF | BLZ | Trevor Lennen |
| 13 | FW | BLZ | Amin August Jr. |

| No. | Pos. | Nation | Player |
|---|---|---|---|
| 14 | MF | BLZ | Alexander Innis |
| 15 | DF | BLZ | Darren Myers |
| 16 | FW | BLZ | Daniel Jimenez |
| 17 | MF | BLZ | Devon Makin |
| 19 | DF | BLZ | Byron Usher |
| 21 | GK | BLZ | Keith Allen |
| 22 | FW | GUA | Elio Ramírez |
| 29 | MF | BLZ | Shamir Pacheco |
| 24 | DF | BLZ | Egemory Flores |
| 25 | DF | BRA | Maílson |

== Performance in international competitions ==
- CONCACAF Champions League

2016–17 – Group stage
