= Norman Broaster Stadium =

Stadium in San Ignacio, Belize

- Brasta
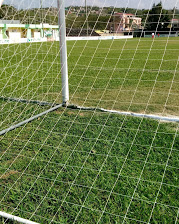
- Interactive map of Norman Broaster Stadium
- Full name: Norman Broaster Stadium
- Location: San Ignacio, Cayo, Belize
- Coordinates: 17°09′37″N 89°04′11″W
- Capacity: 2,000
- Surface: Grass

Construction
- Built: 1950s
- Opened: 1950; 76 years ago

Tenants
- WD Eleven (1950s); Mighty Avengers (1967-1979); World FC (2008-2012); San Ignacio United FC (2011-2015); Belize Defence Force FC (2012-2013); Police United (2015-2017); Verdes FC (2014-present)

Norman Broaster Stadium is a multi-purpose stadium in San Ignacio, Cayo, Belize. It is currently used mostly for football matches and is the home stadium to Verdes FC in the Premier League of Belize (PLB) of the Football Federation of Belize.

The stadium holds 2,000 people. In 2021, the Football Federation of Belize renovated the stadium's changing rooms.
