= Verdes FC =

Belizean football club

Verdes F.C.
- Full name: Verdes Football Club
- Nickname: The Green Machine
- Founded: 1976
- Ground: Norman Broaster Stadium; San Ignacio Town, Belize
- Capacity: 2,000
- Chairman: Ian Haylock
- Manager: Luis Valdés
- League: Premier League of Belize
- 2025–26: Champions (Closing season)
Home colours	Away colours

Verdes F.C. (previously Hankook Verdes) is a Belizean association football club which competes in the Premier League of Belize. They are currently based in Benque Viejo, Belize, a village situated in the district of Cayo, Belize. The club was established in 1976 as Real Verdes Football Club and changed their name to Hankook Verdes in 2004. They are now known only as Verdes F.C, locally being called only Verdes. The club is one of the oldest active professional football teams in Belize and has been in existence since the inception of the Football Federation of Belize. Their home games are played at Norman Broaster Stadium.

The club has established an excellent reputation for the development of many past and current members of the Belize national football team, despite not having won any club championships at the national level until 2008. Verdes F.C. had previously won the amateur Belize National Football Association championship in 1986. In 2004, Hankook Verdes F.C. announced that they would opt out of the Belize Premier Football League due to unprofessional conduct, including late arrivals by officials and the other team, prior to a match against Kulture Yabra. Verdes F.C.'s recent league championships include the opening season of the 2019–20 Premier League of Belize and both seasons of the 2021–22 FFB Top League, where they went undefeated. The club would later win the 2022–23 Closing season.

In 1985, Verdes F.C. was the first team to represent Belize in the CONCACAF Champions' Cup. They have appeared in eight editions of the competition and twice in its successor, the CONCACAF Champions League. Throughout the history of Belizean football, Verdes F.C. has represented its country more than any other club in Belize. The list of CONCACAF opponents includes professional teams such as Cruz Azul, UNAM, Santos Laguna, Querétaro (Mexico); Real España, Platense, Pumas UNAH (Honduras); Xelajú, Municipal, Comunicaciones, (Guatemala);San Francisco (Panama); and Luis Ángel Firpo (El Salvador);Arcahaie (Haiti). Verdes F.C. has the most UNCAF Club Tournament appearances of any Belize football club.

Verdes F.C. appeared in three consecutive editions of the CONCACAF League from 2020 to 2022 and were the second Belizean club to participate in the tournament. Their first attempt in 2020 was halted by a COVID-19 outbreak among the players and the need to quarantine in Panama rather than being able to transit to the CONCACAF League venue in Santo Domingo. Their preliminary round match was cancelled and their opponents, Haitian side Arcahaie FC, was awarded a 3–0 walkover victory. In 2022, they became the first Belizean club to win a competitive series in the competition.

Verdes' heaviest defeat occurred on 20 August 2025, when they lost 8–1 to Costa Rican side Cartaginés at the Estadio Fello Meza in Cartago, Costa Rica.

== Honours ==
- Belize Premier Football League/Premier League of Belize
  - Champions (10): 2007–08, 2014–15 Closing, 2017–18 Opening, 2019–20 Opening, 2021-22 Opening, 2021–22 Closing, 2022–23 Closing, 2024–25 Closing, 2025–26 Opening, 2025–26 Closing

== Performance in International competitions ==
=== CONCACAF Champions' Cup and Champions League ===
Season	Competition	Round	Club		Home	Away	Aggregate
1986	CONCACAF Champions' Cup	2R	(Bermuda)	Pembroke Hamilton Club	2–1	0–3	2–4
1987	CONCACAF Champions' Cup	1R	(Honduras)	Real España	0–2	1–6	1–8
1988	CONCACAF Champions' Cup	PR	(Mexico)	Cruz Azul	0–2	2–12	2–14
1991	CONCACAF Champions' Cup	1R	(Honduras)	Real España	0–1	0–5	0–6
1994	CONCACAF Champions' Cup	PR	(Guatemala)	Comunicaciones	1–3	1–2	2–5
1995	CONCACAF Champions' Cup	1R	(Guatemala)	Municipal	0–3	0–3	0–6
1997	CONCACAF Champions' Cup	1R	(Guatemala)	Xelajú MC	0–0	0–2	0–2
1998	CONCACAF Champions' Cup	Group North B	(Honduras)	Platense	0–0	0–6	4th
1998	CONCACAF Champions' Cup	Group North B	(Guatemala)	Aurora	1–2	3–2	4th
1998	CONCACAF Champions' Cup	Group North B	(El Salvador)	Luis Ángel Firpo	—N/a	1–4	4th
2008–09	CONCACAF Champions League	PR	(Mexico)	Cruz Azul	0–6	0–6	0–12
2015–16	CONCACAF Champions League	Group C	(Mexico)	Querétaro	0–0	0–8	3rd
2015–16	CONCACAF Champions League	Group C	(Panama)	San Francisco	2–1	0–8	3rd

=== CONCACAF League ===
Season	Competition	Round	Club		Home	Away	Aggregate
2020	CONCACAF League	PR	(Haiti)	Arcahaie	0–3 (w/o)		
2021	CONCACAF League	PR	(Costa Rica)	Santos de Guápiles	0–1	1–5	1–6
2022	CONCACAF League	PR	(El Salvador)	Platense	0–0	2–2	2–2 (a)
2022	CONCACAF League	R16	(El Salvador)	Alianza	0–2	1–5	1–7

- Copa Interclubes UNCAF: 4 appearances
  Best: First Round in 1995, 1999, 2006
  1993: Preliminary Round
  1994: Preliminary Round
  1995: First Round
  1999: First Round
  2006: First Round

=== CONCACAF Central American Cup ===
Season	Competition	Round	Club		Home	Away	Aggregate
2023	CONCACAF Central American Cup	Group D	(Honduras)	Motagua	0–5	—N/a	5th
2023	CONCACAF Central American Cup	Group D	(Costa Rica)	Alajuelense	0–3	—N/a	5th
2023	CONCACAF Central American Cup	Group D	(Panama)	Sporting San Miguelito	—N/a	0–4	5th
2023	CONCACAF Central American Cup	Group D	(Honduras)	Olancho	—N/a	2–3	5th
2025	CONCACAF Central American Cup	Group C	(Honduras)	Motagua	1–4	—N/a	5th
2025	CONCACAF Central American Cup	Group C	(Costa Rica)	Saprissa	1–2	—N/a	5th
2025	CONCACAF Central American Cup	Group C	(Panama)	Independiente	—N/a	1–3	5th
2025	CONCACAF Central American Cup	Group C	(Costa Rica)	Cartaginés	—N/a	1–8	5th

=== International level ===
- As of 21 August 2015

Opponent	First meeting	Last Meeting	Pld	W	D	L	GF	GA	GD
(Costa Rica) Alajuelense	1999 Copa Interclubes UNCAF	1999 Copa Interclubes UNCAF	2	0	0	2	1	9	−8
(Guatemala) Aurora	1999 Copa Interclubes UNCAF	1999 Copa Interclubes UNCAF	2	0	0	2	1	8	−7
(Mexico) Cruz Azul	Aug 26, 2008	Sept 9, 2008	2	0	0	2	0	12	−12
(El Salvador) FAS	1999 Copa Interclubes UNCAF	1999 Copa Interclubes UNCAF	2	0	0	2	1	5	−4
(Guatemala) Municipal	1995 CONCACAF Champions' Cup	1995 CONCACAF Champions' Cup	2	0	0	2	0	6	−6
(Honduras) Olimpia	1999 Copa Interclubes UNCAF	1999 Copa Interclubes UNCAF	2	0	0	2	0	3	−3
(Costa Rica) Puntarenas	Aug 22, 2006	Aug 31, 2006	2	0	1	1	1	6	−5
(Mexico) Querétaro	Aug 4, 2015	Sept 17, 2015	2	0	1	1	0	8	−8
(Panama) San Francisco	Sept 22, 2015	Oct 22, 2015	1	1	0	0	2	1	1
(Nicaragua) Walter Ferretti	1999 Copa Interclubes UNCAF	1999 Copa Interclubes UNCAF	1	0	0	1	0	1	−1
Totals			0	0	0	0	0	0	0

- Friendly matches not included.
- Games decided by penalty shootout are counted as ties.

As 6 June 2024

== Current squad ==
Note: Flags indicate national team as defined under FIFA eligibility rules; some limited exceptions apply. Players may hold more than one non-FIFA nationality.

No.	Pos.	Nation	Player
1	GK	BLZ	Dejion Mcfadzean
2	DF	BLZ	Jahyrl Smith
4	DF	BLZ	Brandon Jones
5	MF	BLZ	Glenford Gentle III
6	MF	MEX	Juan Leonel Guerrero Ocampo
7	MF	BLZ	Nahjib Guerra
8	FW	COL	Camilo Marquez
9	MF	URU	Nicolas Rocha
10	MF	BLZ	Jordy Polanco
11	DF	BLZ	Jahron Myvett
13	MF	COL	Jaylen Lennon
14	MF	BLZ	Darrel Myvett
15	FW	COL	Ronald Benavides
16	DF	BLZ	Alence Ayala
17	MF	BLZ	Félix Martínez

No.	Pos.	Nation	Player
18	MF	BLZ	Zion Ramos
19	MF	ARG	Zion Frazer
20	MF	COL	Miguel Medina
22	GK	ARG	Nahuel Paz
24	DF	MEX	Christian Ramírez
25	FW	BLZ	Krisean Lopez
26	MF	COL	Arles Balanta
27	GK	BLZ	Woodrow West
29	MF	BLZ	Trimayne Harris
35	DF	COL	José Cifuentes
41	DF	GUA	Ze Carlos Carrillo
77	FW	BLZ	Desmond Wade
80	DF	MEX	Gerardo Madrid
88	DF	MEX	Marco Zavala
99	DF	BLZ	Everal Trapp
-	FW	ESP	Mika Junco
-	DF	URU	Facundo Álvarez

== Notable former players ==
- Erwin Contreras (Captain, Belize national football team, 1990–93)
- Jorge García (Captain, Belize national football team, 1994–97)

== Managers ==
=== Real Verdes ===
- (Brazil) Antonio Carlos Vieira

=== Verdes Hancock ===
- Nayo Waight (2005)
- Ramon Cayoc (2008)

=== Verdes FC ===
- Alberto Rafael "Chapay" Contreras (1980s-1990s)
- Walter Salazar (2013)
- Pablo Cacho (2014–15)
- Walter Salazar (2015–2017)
- (Belize) Marvin Ottley (2017–)
- (Peru) Martín Dimas Dall'orso (2019–2021)
- (Spain) David Pérez Asensio (July 2021 – March 2023)
- (El Salvador) Angel Orellana (April 2023 - July 2023)
- (Spain) José Migallón (July 2023 - - Present)
