= Independence and Mango Creek =

Independence
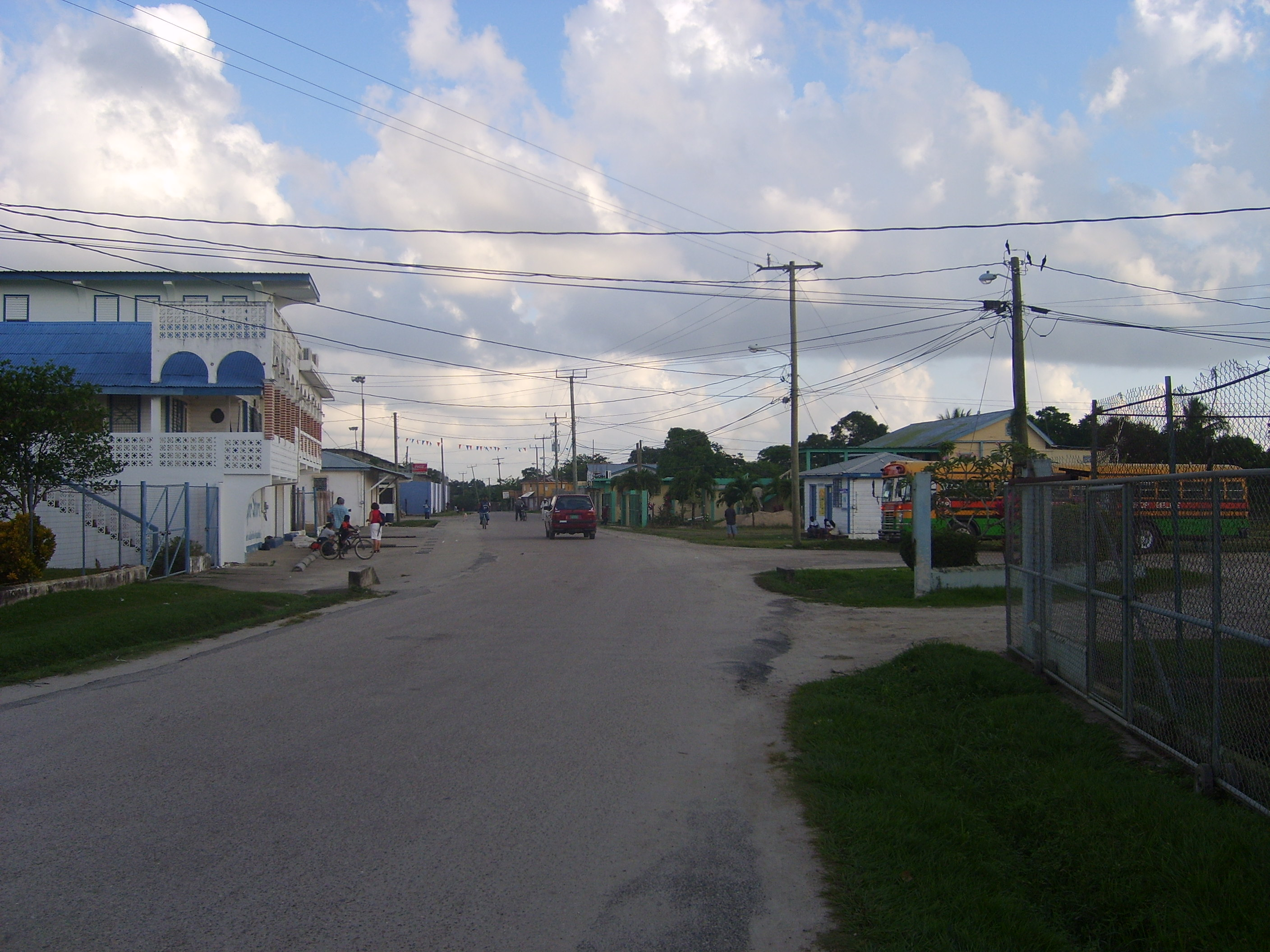
- Independence, Belize

- Location within Belize
- Coordinates: 16°32′N 88°25′W
- Country: Belize
- District: Stann Creek District
- Elevation: 9 m (30 ft)

Population (2010)
  - Total: 4,014
- Time zone: UTC-6 (Central)
- Climate: Am

Independence is a village in the Stann Creek District of Belize. In 2010, Independence had a population of 4,014 people. It is a relatively large village compared to its surrounding communities. It contains 2 primary schools, one secondary school and one college which hosts students from the surrounding communities, and provides access to the only mainland bay.

== History ==
The creek flowing past Independence is called Mangrove Creek, and on the banks of the creek was a large mango tree. When loggers and other tradesmen in the vicinity wanted to visit the area they would say they were going to the mango tree. Over time the village became known as Mango Creek, which is a distortion of Mangrove Creek and Mango. Later a new section of the village was built to the east of Amado Mena Avenue and it was called Independence because of the upcoming independence of Belize. Sometime in the 2010s it became exclusively known as Independence even though a lot of people still know it as Mango Creek today.

== Geography ==
Here's a list of area names in Independence

- Lester Richard Extension Area
- New Site
- Mango Creek

== Education ==
The Independence High School was constructed in 1999.
