= Isidoro Beaton Stadium =

Stadium in Belmopan, Belize

- Interactive map of Isidoro Beaton Stadium
- Location: Belmopan, Belize
- Coordinates: 17°15′5″N 88°45′47″W
- Capacity: 2,500
- Surface: GrassMaster

Construction
- Built: March 2016
- Opened: 15 March 2016; 10 years ago

Tenants
- Belmopan Bandits (2016-present); Belize national football team (2016-present)

Isidoro Beaton Stadium is a multi-purpose stadium in Belmopan, Belize. It is used mostly for football matches and is the home stadium of the Belizean football clubs Belmopan Blaze and Belmopan Bandits. The stadium is able to hold 2,500 people. It is also the most commonly used Belize national football team's home venue.
