= 2012–13 Premier League of Belize =

Premier League of Belize
- Season: 2012–13
- Dates: 25 August 2012 – 25 May 2013
- Champions: Opening: Belmopan Bandits; Closing: Police United
- Matches: 152
- Goals: 412 (2.71 per match)
- Top goalscorer: Opening: Daniel Jimenez (13); Closing: Jeromy James Deon McCaulay (9)
- Biggest home win: Placencia Assassins 5-1 Paradise/Freedom Fighters (11 November 2012); Belmopan Bandits 5-1 San Ignacio United (27 April 2013)
- Biggest away win: San Felipe Barcelona 0-8 FC Belize (2 December 2012)
- Highest scoring: San Felipe Barcelona 0-8 FC Belize (2 December 2012)
- Longest winning run: Police United (6)
- Longest unbeaten run: Belmopan Bandits (20)
- Longest winless run: San Ignacio United (15)
- Longest losing run: Juventus (18)

The 2012–13 Premier League of Belize was the second season of the highest competitive football league in Belize, after it was founded in 2011. There were two seasons which were spread over two years, the opening (which was played towards the end of 2012) and the closing (which was played at the beginning of 2013).

== Opening season ==
All but one of the 12 teams that competed in the 2012 Premier League of Belize continued to play in the opening season of 2012–13, with the exception of World FC who were replaced by R.G. City Boys United from Belize City.

The league is split into two zones; Zone A and Zone B. Each team will play teams in their zone twice, plus four out-of-zone games, meaning each team plays a total of 14 regular season games. Subsequently the top 2 teams from each zone advances to the playoffs. The opening season commenced on 25 August 2012.

The Round 10 game between Juventus and Belize Defence Force scheduled for 4 November 2012 was abandoned at half time due to rain, with Belize Defence Force leading 3-0. Juventus forfeited the game on 23 November 2012, giving the 3-0 victory to Belize Defence Force.

The Round 14 game between San Pedro Seadogs and Juventus scheduled for 2 December 2012 was forfeited by Juventus, giving the 3-0 victory to San Pedro Seadogs.

=== Teams ===
==== Zone A ====
Team	City	Stadium
Belize Defence Force	San Ignacio	Norman Broaster Stadium
Belmopan Bandits	Belmopan	Isidoro Beaton Stadium
FC Belize	Belize City	MCC Grounds
Juventus	Orange Walk Town	Louisiana Football Field
San Felipe Barcelona	San Felipe	San Felipe Football Field
San Pedro Seadogs	San Pedro	Ambergris Stadium & MCC Grounds

==== Zone B ====
Team	City	Stadium
Paradise/Freedom Fighters	Independence	Michael Ashcroft Stadium
Placencia Assassins	Placencia	Placencia Football Field
Police United	Belmopan	FFB Stadium & Isidoro Beaton Stadium
R.G. City Boys United	Belize City	MCC Grounds
San Ignacio United	San Ignacio	Norman Broaster Stadium
Verdes FC	Benque Viejo del Carmen	Marshalleck Stadium

=== League table ===
==== Zone A ====
Pos	Team	Pld	W	D	L	GF	GA	GD	Pts	Qualification
1	Belmopan Bandits	14	9	4	1	26	4	+22	31	Qualification to the Playoffs
2	Belize Defence Force	14	8	4	2	25	10	+15	28	Qualification to the Playoffs
3	FC Belize	14	8	4	2	22	7	+15	28	
4	San Pedro Seadogs	14	4	1	9	14	27	−13	13	
5	Juventus	14	3	0	11	7	35	−28	9	
6	San Felipe Barcelona	14	2	2	10	16	34	−18	8	

Source: Soccerway
Rules for classification: 1) points; 2) goal difference; 3) number of goals scored.

==== Zone B ====
Pos	Team	Pld	W	D	L	GF	GA	GD	Pts	Qualification
1	Police United	14	10	0	4	30	19	+11	30	Qualification to the Playoffs
2	Placencia Assassins	14	9	2	3	27	10	+17	29	Qualification to the Playoffs
3	Verdes FC	14	9	2	3	26	16	+10	29	
4	R.G. City Boys United	14	4	3	7	15	24	−9	15	
5	Paradise/Freedom Fighters	14	4	1	9	21	30	−9	13	
6	San Ignacio United	14	0	5	9	7	20	−13	5	

Source: Soccerway
Rules for classification: 1) points; 2) goal difference; 3) number of goals scored.

=== Results ===
==== Round 1 ====
Zone A

25 August 2012
19:30

Belmopan Bandits	0 – 1	FC Belize
		Leon Cadle 87'

Isidoro Beaton Stadium, Belmopan

26 August 2012
15:30

San Felipe Barcelona	1 – 3	San Pedro Seadogs
Eliazar Itza 54'		Francisco Noralez 7'; Everette Genus 63'; Jesse Smith 75'

San Felipe Football Field, San Felipe

26 August 2012
16:00

Belize Defence Force	2 – 0	Juventus
Vallan Symms 63'; Shane Flores 77'

Norman Broaster Stadium, San Ignacio

Zone B

25 August 2012
19:30

San Ignacio United	0 – 2	Verdes FC
		Julio Ayala 71'; Emmanuel Martinez 90+2'

Norman Broaster Stadium, San Ignacio

26 August 2012
16:00

Placencia Assassins	1 – 0	Police United
Luis Torres 72'

Placencia Football Field, Placencia

26 August 2012
16:00

R.G. City Boys United	0 – 1	Paradise/Freedom Fighters
		Dion Burgess 90+1'

MCC Grounds, Belize City

==== Round 2 ====
Zone A

2 September 2012
15:30

San Pedro Seadogs	0 – 0	FC Belize

MCC Grounds, Belize City

2 September 2012
16:00

Belize Defence Force	3 – 0	San Felipe Barcelona
Byron Usher 40'; Lisbey Castillo 61'; Shane Flores 90'

Norman Broaster Stadium, San Ignacio

2 September 2012
16:00

Juventus	0 – 6	Belmopan Bandits
		David Madrid 3', 5'; David Trapp 50'; Ernest Wiltshire 69', 79', 80'

Louisiana Football Field, Orange Walk Town

Zone B

1 September 2012
19:30

Paradise/Freedom Fighters	0 – 1	Placencia Assassins
		Dalton Eiley 28'

Michael Ashcroft Stadium, Independence

1 September 2012
19:30

Verdes FC	2 – 1	Police United
San Mendez 37'; Rodney Pacheco 62'		Evan Mariano 52'

Marshalleck Stadium, Benque Viejo del Carmen

5 September 2012
19:30

R.G. City Boys United	0 – 0	San Ignacio United

MCC Grounds, Belize City

==== Round 3 ====
Zone A

8 September 2012
19:30

Belmopan Bandits	1 – 0	San Felipe Barcelona
Jeromy James 41'

Isidoro Beaton Stadium, Belmopan

9 September 2012
16:00

Belize Defence Force	4 – 0	San Pedro Seadogs
Francisco Noralez O.G 4'; Marlon Meza 45'; Vallan Symms 80'; Byron Usher 90'

Norman Broaster Stadium, San Ignacio

9 September 2012
16:00

Juventus	0 – 2	FC Belize
		Cristobal Gilharry 75'; Lorenzo Diaz 89'

Louisiana Football Field, Orange Walk Town

Zone B

8 September 2012
19:30

Paradise/Freedom Fighters	1 – 1	San Ignacio United
Victor Franco 22'		Joel Guzman 40'

Michael Ashcroft Stadium, Independence

9 September 2012
16:00

Placencia Assassins	3 – 2	Verdes FC
Zerrick Torres 13'; Rollin Burgess 25'; Dalton Eiley 67' (pen.)		Miguel Aguilar 3'; Emmanuel Martinez 45'

Placencia Football Field, Placencia

9 September 2012
16:00

Police United	3 – 2	R.G. City Boys United
Lennox Castillo 22'; Evan Mariano 67'; Orlando Jimenez 90'		Delroy Andrews 15'; David McCaulay Jr. 72'

FFB Stadium, Belmopan

==== Round 4 ====
Zone A

15 September 2012
19:30

Belmopan Bandits	2 – 0	San Pedro Seadogs
Woodrow West 75' (pen.); Denmark Casey Jr. 85'

Isidoro Beaton Stadium, Belmopan

16 September 2012
15:30

San Felipe Barcelona	1 – 2	Juventus
Orvin Wade (x1)		Michael Whittaker (x2)

San Felipe Football Field, San Felipe

16 September 2012
16:00

Belize Defence Force	1 – 2	FC Belize
Lisbey Castillo (x1)		John King (x1); Michael Hernandez (x1)

Norman Broaster Stadium, San Ignacio

Zone B

15 September 2012
19:30

San Ignacio United	0 – 3	Placencia Assassins
		Ashley Torres 74', 89'; Luis Torres 85'

Norman Broaster Stadium, San Ignacio

16 September 2012
16:00

Police United	1 – 0	Paradise/Freedom Fighters
Daniel Jimenez (x1)

FFB Stadium, Belmopan

16 September 2012
16:00

R.G. City Boys United	0 – 3	Verdes FC
		Julian Maldonado (x2); Miguel Aguilar (x1)

MCC Grounds, Belize City

==== Round 5 ====
Zone A

23 September 2012
16:00

Belize Defence Force	1 – 1	Belmopan Bandits
Ralph Flores 34'		David Madrid 75'

Norman Broaster Stadium, San Ignacio

23 September 2012
16:00

FC Belize	0 – 0	San Felipe Barcelona

MCC Grounds, Belize City

23 September 2012
16:00

Juventus	1 – 0	San Pedro Seadogs
Michael Whittaker 21'

Louisiana Football Field, Orange Walk Town

Zone B

20 September 2012
19:30

San Ignacio United	0 – 1	Police United
		Gilbert Carrillo O.G 87'

Norman Broaster Stadium, San Ignacio

22 September 2012
19:30

Verdes FC	3 – 2	Paradise/Freedom Fighters
Humberto Requena Jr. 24'; Pedro Guerra 63'; Emmanuel Martinez 82'		Robert Muschamp 70'; Alexander Peters 87'

Marshalleck Stadium, Benque Viejo del Carmen

23 September 2012
16:00

Placencia Assassins	1 – 2	R.G. City Boys United
Collin Westby 89'		Dalton Cayetano 29'; David McCaulay Jr. 81'

Placencia Football Field, Placencia

==== Round 6 ====
Open Zone

29 September 2012
19:30

Belmopan Bandits	3 – 0	Paradise/Freedom Fighters
David Trapp 42'; David Madrid 51'; Gilbert Swaso 56'

Isidoro Beaton Stadium, Belmopan

29 September 2012
19:30

San Pedro Seadogs	1 – 3	Police United
Francisco Reyes 90+'		Evan Mariano 59'; Francis Budna 84'; Lennox Castillo 88'

MCC Grounds, Belize City

30 September 2012
15:30

San Felipe Barcelona	2 – 2	Placencia Assassins
Orvin Wade 53'; Oscar Acevedo 70'		Ashley Torres 84', 87'

San Felipe Football Field, San Felipe

30 September 2012
16:00

Belize Defence Force	0 – 0	Verdes FC

Norman Broaster Stadium, San Ignacio

30 September 2012
16:00

FC Belize	3 – 1	R.G. City Boys United
David Ramos 14'; Leon Cadle 45+'; John King 57'		Dalton Cayetano 5'

MCC Grounds, Belize City

30 September 2012
16:00

Juventus	2 – 1	San Ignacio United
Gilderado Cervantes 62'; Norman Nunez 84' (pen.)		Joel Guzman 28'

Louisiana Football Field, Orange Walk Town

==== Round 7 ====
Open Zone

6 October 2012
19:30

Paradise/Freedom Fighters	3 – 1	San Pedro Seadogs
Alexander Peters 41'; Victor Franco 43'; Onest Martinez 87'		Mario Chimal 90+'

Michael Ashcroft Stadium, Independence

6 October 2012
19:30

Police United	3 – 0	FC Belize
Daniel Jimenez 14', 77'; Evan Mariano 43'

Isidoro Beaton Stadium, Belmopan

6 October 2012
19:30

San Ignacio United	1 – 2	San Felipe Barcelona
Carlos Vasquez 15'		Oscar Acevedo 75', 78'

Norman Broaster Stadium, San Ignacio

6 October 2012
19:30

Verdes FC	0 – 2	Belmopan Bandits
		Jacinto Bermudez 85'; Edmund Pandy Jr. 87'

Marshalleck Stadium, Benque Viejo del Carmen

7 October 2012
16:00

Placencia Assassins	1 – 0	Belize Defence Force
Ashley Torres 90+'

Placencia Football Field, Placencia

7 October 2012
16:00

R.G. City Boys United	2 – 0	Juventus
Deon McCaulay 19', 62'

MCC Grounds, Belize City

==== Round 8 ====
Open Zone

13 October 2012
19:30

Paradise/Freedom Fighters	2 – 3	Belize Defence Force
Leonard Valdez 16'; Alexander Peters 45+'		Harrison Tasher 20'; Luis Mendez 64'; Richard Jimenez 82'

Michael Ashcroft Stadium, Independence

13 October 2012
19:30

Police United	3 – 1	San Felipe Barcelona
Amin August Jr. 24'; Evan Mariano 36'; Daniel Jimenez 50'		Josue Acevedo 15'

Isidoro Beaton Stadium, Belmopan

13 October 2012
19:30

San Ignacio United	1 – 2	Belmopan Bandits
Carlos Vasquez 68'		David Trapp 31'; Denmark Casey Jr. 47'

Norman Broaster Stadium, San Ignacio

13 October 2012
19:30

Verdes FC	1 – 0	FC Belize
Julian Maldonado 35'

Marshalleck Stadium, Benque Viejo del Carmen

14 October 2012
16:00

Placencia Assassins	2 – 0	Juventus
Dellon Torres 34'; Collin Westby 50'

Placencia Football Field, Placencia

14 October 2012
16:00

R.G. City Boys United	3 – 0	San Pedro Seadogs
Jason Young 7'; Deon McCaulay 31' (pen.), 38'

MCC Grounds, Belize City

==== Round 9 ====
Open Zone

27 October 2012
19:30

Belmopan Bandits	0 – 0	R.G. City Boys United

Isidoro Beaton Stadium, Belmopan

28 October 2012
14:30

San Pedro Seadogs	1 – 0	San Ignacio United
Angel Cantun 41'

Ambergris Stadium, San Pedro

28 October 2012
15:30

San Felipe Barcelona	3 – 4	Paradise/Freedom Fighters
Clifton West 5', 33'; Orvin Wade 18'		Vicente Acal 29'; Leonard Valdez 60', 66' (pen.), 78' (pen.)

San Felipe Football Field, San Felipe

28 October 2012
16:00

Belize Defence Force	3 – 1	Police United
Ralph Flores 33'; Vallan Symms 48' (pen.); Richard Jimenez 82'		Daniel Jimenez 45+'

Norman Broaster Stadium, San Ignacio

28 October 2012
16:00

FC Belize	1 – 0	Placencia Assassins
John King 32'

MCC Grounds, Belize City

28 October 2012
16:00

Juventus	1 – 4	Verdes FC
Michael Whittaker 50'		Miguel Aguilar 15', 80'; Rodney Pacheco 41' (pen.); Julio Ayala 72'

Louisiana Football Field, Orange Walk Town

==== Round 10 ====
Zone A

4 November 2012
14:30

San Pedro Seadogs	3 – 1	San Felipe Barcelona
Mario Chimal 55'; Angel Cantun 82'; Jesse Smith 85'		Oscar Acevedo 25'

Ambergris Stadium, San Pedro

4 November 2012
16:00

FC Belize	0 – 0	Belmopan Bandits

MCC Grounds, Belize City

4 November 2012
16:00

Juventus	0 – 3	Belize Defence Force

Louisiana Football Field, Orange Walk Town

Zone B

3 November 2012
19:30

Paradise/Freedom Fighters	2 – 3	R.G. City Boys United
Leonard Valdez 58' (pen.); Wilmer Garcia 89'		Jason Young 29'; Deon McCaulay 33'; Dalton Cayetano 37'

Michael Ashcroft Stadium, Independence

3 November 2012
19:30

Police United	2 – 1	Placencia Assassins
Orlando Jimenez 51' (pen.); Evan Mariano 83'		Garry Young 17'

Isidoro Beaton Stadium, Belmopan

3 November 2012
19:30

Verdes FC	0 – 0	San Ignacio United

Marshalleck Stadium, Benque Viejo del Carmen

==== Round 11 ====
Zone A

10 November 2012
19:30

Belmopan Bandits	3 – 0	Juventus
David Trapp 21'; Lincoln Wiltshire 46'; Floyd Jones 75'

Isidoro Beaton Stadium, Belmopan

11 November 2012
15:30

San Felipe Barcelona	1 – 2	Belize Defence Force
Jaziz Wicab 90+'		Luis Mendez 71'; Ryan Simpson 85'

San Felipe Football Field, San Felipe

11 November 2012
16:00

FC Belize	3 – 1	San Pedro Seadogs
Ryan Gill 45'; Avian Crawford 48', 74'		Linden Galvez 90+'

MCC Grounds, Belize City

Zone B

10 November 2012
19:30

San Ignacio United	1 – 1	R.G. City Boys United
Floyd Lemus 56'		Jason Young 70'

Norman Broaster Stadium, San Ignacio

11 November 2012
15:30

Police United	1 – 3	Verdes FC
Daniel Jimenez 62'		Julio Ayala 38', 78'; Rodney Pacheco 82'

FFB Stadium, Belmopan

11 November 2012
16:00

Placencia Assassins	5 – 1	Paradise/Freedom Fighters
Garry Young 36'; Bernard Linarez 39'; Dalton Eiley 48' (pen.); Ashley Torres 78' (pen.); Zerrick Torres 88'		Victor Franco 82'

Placencia Football Field, Placencia

==== Round 12 ====
Zone A

18 November 2012
14:30

San Pedro Seadogs	0 – 4	Belmopan Bandits
		Woodrow West 18' (pen.); Jacinto Bermudez 31', 75', 81'

Ambergris Stadium, San Pedro

18 November 2012
16:00

FC Belize	0 – 0	Belize Defence Force

MCC Grounds, Belize City

18 November 2012
16:00

Juventus	1 – 4	San Felipe Barcelona
Michael Whittaker 62'		Gian Teck O.G 1'; Josue Acevedo 61'; Gabriel Perez 75'; Clifton West 90'

Louisiana Football Field, Orange Walk Town

Zone B

17 November 2012
19:30

Paradise/Freedom Fighters	2 – 3	Police United
Alexander Peters 44'; Wilmer Garcia 90+'		Daniel Jimenez 37'; Lennox Castillo 63'; Evan Mariano 86'

Michael Ashcroft Stadium, Independence

17 November 2012
19:30

Verdes FC	3 – 0	R.G. City Boys United
Julian Maldonado 25', 73'; Emmanuel Martinez 46'

Marshalleck Stadium, Benque Viejo del Carmen

18 November 2012
16:00

Placencia Assassins	0 – 0	San Ignacio United

Placencia Football Field, Placencia

==== Round 13 ====
Zone A

25 November 2012
14:30

San Pedro Seadogs	1 – 2	Belize Defence Force
Angel Cantun 66'		Tyrone Pandy 44'; Justo Lewis 60'

Ambergris Stadium, San Pedro

25 November 2012
15:30

San Felipe Barcelona	0 – 1	Belmopan Bandits
		David Madrid 45'

San Felipe Football Field, San Felipe

25 November 2012
15:30

FC Belize	2 – 0	Juventus
Cristobal Gilharry 40'; Michael Hernandez 75'

MCC Grounds, Belize City

Zone B

24 November 2012
19:30

R.G. City Boys United	1 – 4	Police United
Deon McCaulay 29'		Evan Mariano 8'; Daniel Jimenez 34', 87', 90'

MCC Grounds, Belize City

24 November 2012
19:30

San Ignacio United	0 – 1	Paradise/Freedom Fighters
		Leonard Valdez 35'

Norman Broaster Stadium, San Ignacio

24 November 2012
19:30

Verdes FC	0 – 4	Placencia Assassins
		Ashley Torres 35'; Rollin Burgess 55'; Luis Torres 68'; Bernard Linarez 73'

Marshalleck Stadium, Benque Viejo del Carmen

==== Round 14 ====
Zone A

1 December 2012
19:30

Belmopan Bandits	1 – 1	Belize Defence Force
Jeromy James 44'		Victor Nunez 86'

Isidoro Beaton Stadium, Belmopan

2 December 2012
14:30

San Pedro Seadogs	3 – 0	Juventus

Ambergris Stadium, San Pedro

2 December 2012
15:30

San Felipe Barcelona	0 – 8	FC Belize
		John King 24', 37', 70', 76', 88'; Francisco Briceno 77'; David Ramos 80'; Christian Perez 82' (pen.)

San Felipe Football Field, San Felipe

Zone B

1 December 2012
19:30

Paradise/Freedom Fighters	2 – 3	Verdes FC
Eduardo Martinez 31'; Delroy Flores 90'		Julio Ayala 17'; Julian Maldonado 68'; Walter Chinchillas 88'

Michael Ashcroft Stadium, Independence

2 December 2012
16:00

Police United	4 – 2	San Ignacio United
Evan Mariano 12'; Daniel Jimenez 41', 79'; Lennox Castillo 90+'		Rosny Martinez 22'; Joel Guzman 87'

Isidoro Beaton Stadium, Belmopan

2 December 2012
16:00

R.G. City Boys United	0 – 3	Placencia Assassins
		Ernie Whyte 61'; Brent Whyte 72'; Dalton Eiley 76' (pen.)

MCC Grounds, Belize City

=== Playoffs ===
Semi-finals
A1	Belmopan Bandits	1	0	1
B2	Placencia Assassins	0	0	0
B1	Police United	2	0	2
A2	Belize Defence Force	1	0	1

Finals
A1	Belmopan Bandits	1	1	2
B1	Police United	1	0	1

==== Semi-finals ====
Game One

8 December 2012
19:30

Placencia Assassins	0 – 1	Belmopan Bandits
		Jeromy James 22'

Michael Ashcroft Stadium, Independence

9 December 2012
15:30

Belize Defence Force	1 – 2	Police United
Vallan Symms 11'		Evan Mariano 33'; Trevor Lennan 90+'

Norman Broaster Stadium, San Ignacio

Game Two

15 December 2012
19:30

Belmopan Bandits	0 – 0	Placencia Assassins

Isidoro Beaton Stadium, Belmopan

16 December 2012
15:00

Police United	0 – 0	Belize Defence Force

Isidoro Beaton Stadium, Belmopan

==== Finals ====
Game One

23 December 2012
15:30

Police United	1 – 1	Belmopan Bandits
Daniel Jimenez 24'		Dennis Serano 45'

Isidoro Beaton Stadium, Belmopan

Game Two

30 December 2012
15:30

Belmopan Bandits	1 – 0	Police United
Jacinto Bermudez 31'

FFB Stadium, Belmopan

2012–13 Opening season champions

1st title

=== Season statistics ===
==== Top scorers ====
Rank	Player	Team	Goals
1	(Belize) Daniel Jimenez	Police United	13
2	(Belize) Evan Mariano	Police United	10
3	(Belize) John King	FC Belize	8
4	(Belize) Ashley Torres	Placencia Assassins	7
5	(Belize) Julian Maldonado	Verdes FC	6
5	(Belize) Deon McCaulay	R.G. City Boys United	6
5	(Belize) Leonard Valdez	Paradise/Freedom Fighters	6
8	(Belize) Julio Ayala	Verdes FC	5
8	(Belize) Jacinto Bermudez	Belmopan Bandits	5
8	(Belize) David Madrid	Belmopan Bandits	5
8	(Belize) Michael Whittaker	Juventus	5

(*) Please note playoff goals are included.

==== Hat tricks ====
Player	For	Against	Result	Date
(Belize) Ernest Wiltshire	Belmopan Bandits	Juventus	6–0 (A)	2 September 2012
(Belize) Leonard Valdez	Paradise/Freedom Fighters	San Felipe Barcelona	4–3 (A)	28 October 2012
(Belize) Jacinto Bermudez	Belmopan Bandits	San Pedro Seadogs	4–0 (A)	18 November 2012
(Belize) Daniel Jimenez	Police United	R.G. City Boys United	4–1 (A)	24 November 2012
(Belize) John King^{5}	FC Belize	San Felipe Barcelona	8–0 (A)	2 December 2012

- ^{5} Player scored 5 goals

=== Awards ===
On 28 December 2012, the Premier League of Belize Commissioner, Myito Perdomo announced the 2012-13 opening season Individual Awards for the regular season.

Award	Recipient	Team
Most Goals	(Belize) Daniel Jimenez	Police United
MVP (Regular Season)	(Belize) Woodrow West	Belmopan Bandits
MVP (Playoff)	(Belize) Jacinto Bermudez	Belmopan Bandits
Best Forward	(Belize) Evan Mariano	Police United
Best Midfielder	(Belize) David Trapp	Belmopan Bandits
Best Defender	(Belize) Dalton Eiley	Placencia Assassins
Best Goalkeeper	(Belize) Woodrow West	Belmopan Bandits
Rookie	(Belize) Eduardo Gongora	Verdes FC
Coach	(Belize) Edmund Pandy Sr.	Belmopan Bandits

== Closing season ==
Only 8 of the 12 teams competing in the opening season continued to play in the closing season. Juventus, Paradise/Freedom Fighters, R.G. City Boys United and San Pedro Seadogs were the absentees.

Instead of being split into two groups, like the opening season, there would be one league consisting of 8 teams. The closing season commenced on 9 February 2013.

The Round 8 game between Police United and Placencia Assassins played on 28 March 2013 which was originally won by Placencia 3-0 was overturned after a successful protest by Police United, meaning the latter were awarded the 3-0 victory by default.

=== Teams ===
Team	City	Stadium
Belize Defence Force	San Ignacio	Norman Broaster Stadium
Belmopan Bandits	Belmopan	Isidoro Beaton Stadium
FC Belize	Belize City	MCC Grounds
Placencia Assassins	Placencia	Placencia Football Field
Police United	Belize City	MCC Grounds
San Felipe Barcelona	Orange Walk Town	People's Stadium
San Ignacio United	San Ignacio	Norman Broaster Stadium
Verdes FC	Benque Viejo del Carmen	Marshalleck Stadium

=== League table ===
Pos	Team	Pld	W	D	L	GF	GA	GD	Pts	Qualification
1	Belmopan Bandits	14	10	2	2	31	11	+20	32	Qualification to the Playoffs
2	Belize Defence Force	14	9	2	3	27	13	+14	29	Qualification to the Playoffs
3	Police United	14	6	2	6	24	20	+4	20	Qualification to the Playoffs
4	FC Belize	14	6	2	6	14	13	+1	20	Qualification to the Playoffs
5	Placencia Assassins	14	5	2	7	18	22	−4	17	
6	Verdes FC	14	5	1	8	15	21	−6	16	
7	San Ignacio United	14	3	4	7	15	28	−13	13	
8	San Felipe Barcelona	14	3	3	8	14	30	−16	12	

Source: Soccerway
Rules for classification: 1) points; 2) goal difference; 3) number of goals scored.

=== Results ===
==== Round 1 ====
9 February 2013
19:30

Belmopan Bandits	4 – 0	Verdes FC
Jeromy James 1', 69'; David Madrid 19'; Brandon Peyrefitte 33'

Isidoro Beaton Stadium, Belmopan

10 February 2013
15:30

Placencia Assassins	1 – 3	Police United
Ernie Whyte 33'		Jermmy Bermudez 21'; Evan Mariano 66'; Lennox Castillo 90+'

Placencia Football Field, Placencia

10 February 2013
15:30

San Ignacio United	2 – 3	Belize Defence Force
Leonard Valdez 41'; Felix Miranda 90+'		Paul Nunez 9', 32'; Harrison Tasher 80'

Norman Broaster Stadium, San Ignacio

10 February 2013
16:00

FC Belize	0 – 2	San Felipe Barcelona
		Clifton West 46'; Deris Benavides 77'

MCC Grounds, Belize City

==== Round 2 ====
16 February 2013
19:30

Belmopan Bandits	2 – 0	San Felipe Barcelona
David Trapp 27' (pen.); Ian Gaynair 89'

Isidoro Beaton Stadium, Belmopan

16 February 2013
19:30

Verdes FC	0 – 1	San Ignacio United
		Leonard Valdez 48'

Marshalleck Stadium, Benque Viejo del Carmen

17 February 2013
15:30

Belize Defence Force	2 – 1	Placencia Assassins
Paul Nunez 42'; Shane Flores 90+'		Luis Torres 56'

Norman Broaster Stadium, San Ignacio

17 February 2013
16:00

Police United	0 – 1	FC Belize
		Michael Hernandez 30'

MCC Grounds, Belize City

==== Round 3 ====
23 February 2013
19:30

Belmopan Bandits	3 – 2	Police United
Jeromy James 40'; Jacinto Bermudez 75'; David Trapp 82'		Amin August Jr. 25'; Daniel Jimenez 50'

Isidoro Beaton Stadium, Belmopan

24 February 2013
15:30

Placencia Assassins	2 – 1	Verdes FC
Zerrick Torres 12'; Alexander Peters 24'		Wilmer Garcia 76'

Placencia Football Field, Placencia

24 February 2013
15:30

San Ignacio United	0 – 2	San Felipe Barcelona
		Osmar Duran 12'; Clifton West 20'

Norman Broaster Stadium, San Ignacio

24 February 2013
16:00

FC Belize	1 – 0	Belize Defence Force
Norman Nunez 77'

MCC Grounds, Belize City

==== Round 4 ====
2 March 2013
19:30

Police United	1 – 1	San Ignacio United
Daniel Jimenez 50'		Rosny Martinez 33'

MCC Grounds, Belize City

2 March 2013
19:30

Verdes FC	2 – 1	FC Belize
Julian Maldonado 23'; Julio Ayala 90+'		Norman Nunez 36'

Marshalleck Stadium, Benque Viejo del Carmen

3 March 2013
15:30

Belize Defence Force	2 – 0	Belmopan Bandits
Richard Jimenez 8'; Khalil Velasquez 58'

Norman Broaster Stadium, San Ignacio

3 March 2013
15:30

San Felipe Barcelona	2 – 3	Placencia Assassins
Deris Benavides 45', 48'		Kareem Haylock 38'; Kenny Canul O.G 65'; Alexander Peters 90+'

People's Stadium, Orange Walk Town

==== Round 5 ====
9 March 2013
19:30

Verdes FC	0 – 1	Police United
		Evan Mariano 65'

Marshalleck Stadium, Benque Viejo del Carmen

10 March 2013
15:30

Belize Defence Force	3 – 1	San Felipe Barcelona
Byron Usher 36'; Vallan Symms 69' (pen.); Shane Flores 87'		Oscar Acevedo 90'

Norman Broaster Stadium, San Ignacio

10 March 2013
15:30

Placencia Assassins	1 – 1	San Ignacio United
Ashley Torres 17'		Carlos Vasquez 70'

Placencia Football Field, Placencia

10 March 2013
16:00

FC Belize	0 – 0	Belmopan Bandits

MCC Grounds, Belize City

==== Round 6 ====
16 March 2013
19:30

Belmopan Bandits	2 – 1	Placencia Assassins
Jeromy James 78'; David Madrid 86'		Ashley Torres 31'

Isidoro Beaton Stadium, Belmopan

17 March 2013
15:30

San Felipe Barcelona	1 – 1	Verdes FC
Deris Benavides 39'		Julian Maldonado 90+'

People's Stadium, Orange Walk Town

17 March 2013
15:30

San Ignacio United	1 – 0	FC Belize
Garret Bermudez 15'

Norman Broaster Stadium, San Ignacio

17 March 2013
16:00

Police United	0 – 2	Belize Defence Force
		Vallan Symms 17' (pen.), 90+'

MCC Grounds, Belize City

==== Round 7 ====
21 March 2013
19:30

San Ignacio United	1 – 1	Belmopan Bandits
Rosny Martinez 44'		Darren Myers 81'

Norman Broaster Stadium, San Ignacio

21 March 2013
19:30

Verdes FC	2 – 0	Belize Defence Force
Julio Ayala 28', 33'

Marshalleck Stadium, Benque Viejo del Carmen

24 March 2013
16:00

FC Belize	1 – 0	Placencia Assassins
Cristobal Gilharry 75' (pen.)

MCC Grounds, Belize City

10 April 2013
19:30

San Felipe Barcelona	1 – 6	Police United
Oscar Acevedo 62'		Daniel Jimenez 11', 15'; Lennox Castillo 27'; Andres Makin Jr. 37'; Highking Roberts 40'; Jermmy Bermudez 73'

People's Stadium, Orange Walk Town

==== Round 8 ====
27 March 2013
19:30

Belize Defence Force	1 – 0	San Ignacio United
Harrison Tasher 53'

Norman Broaster Stadium, San Ignacio

27 March 2013
19:30

Verdes FC	1 – 3	Belmopan Bandits
Julian Maldonado 88'		Deon McCaulay 24', 61'; Jeromy James 82'

Marshalleck Stadium, Benque Viejo del Carmen

28 March 2013
19:30

Police United	3 – 0	Placencia Assassins

MCC Grounds, Belize City

28 March 2013
19:30

San Felipe Barcelona	1 – 2	FC Belize
Deris Benavides 54'		John King 43'; Cristobal Gilharry 59'

People's Stadium, Orange Walk Town

==== Round 9 ====
30 March 2013
16:00

Placencia Assassins	1 – 1	Belize Defence Force
Dellon Torres 90+'		Byron Usher 26'

Placencia Football Field, Placencia

30 March 2013
19:30

FC Belize	2 – 0	Police United
Leon Jones 20'; Michael Hernandez 75'

MCC Grounds, Belize City

31 March 2013
15:30

San Felipe Barcelona	0 – 3	Belmopan Bandits
		Deon McCaulay 15', 33'; David Trapp 44'

People's Stadium, Orange Walk Town

31 March 2013
15:30

San Ignacio United	3 – 2	Verdes FC
Seannon Defour 26'; Leonard Valdez 39'; Garret Bermudez 60'		Nahjib Guerra 47'; Emmanuel Martinez 78'

Norman Broaster Stadium, San Ignacio

==== Round 10 ====
3 April 2013
19:30

Police United	0 – 4	Belmopan Bandits
		Jeromy James 17'; Deon McCaulay 56', 68', 85'

MCC Grounds, Belize City

3 April 2013
19:30

Verdes FC	2 – 0	Placencia Assassins
Humberto Requena Jr. 11'; Rodney Pacheco 65'

Marshalleck Stadium, Benque Viejo del Carmen

4 April 2013
19:30

Belize Defence Force	1 – 1	FC Belize
Marlon Meza 90+'		Leon Jones 39'

Norman Broaster Stadium, San Ignacio

4 April 2013
19:30

San Felipe Barcelona	1 – 1	San Ignacio United
Clifton West 70'		Rosny Martinez 20'

People's Stadium, Orange Walk Town

==== Round 11 ====
6 April 2013
19:30

Belmopan Bandits	2 – 1	Belize Defence Force
Denmark Casey Jr. 30'; Deon McCaulay 85'		Harrison Tasher 78'

Isidoro Beaton Stadium, Belmopan

7 April 2013
15:30

Placencia Assassins	0 – 1	San Felipe Barcelona
		Clifton West 56'

Placencia Football Field, Placencia

7 April 2013
15:30

San Ignacio United	1 – 4	Police United
Garret Bermudez 90+'		Amin August Jr. 16'; Lennox Castillo 17'; Orlando Jimenez 33'; Bernel Valdez 74'

Norman Broaster Stadium, San Ignacio

7 April 2013
16:00

FC Belize	1 – 2	Verdes FC
Cristobal Gilharry 63'		Gilroy Thurton 3', 48'

MCC Grounds, Belize City

==== Round 12 ====
13 April 2013
19:30

Belmopan Bandits	1 – 0	FC Belize
Deon McCaulay 61'

Isidoro Beaton Stadium, Belmopan

14 April 2013
15:30

San Felipe Barcelona	0 – 6	Belize Defence Force
		Shane Flores 45'; Harrison Tasher 61', 79', 90+'; Jeremy Gentle 77'; Carlton Thomas 85'

People's Stadium, Orange Walk Town

14 April 2013
15:30

San Ignacio United	2 – 3	Placencia Assassins
Joel Guzman 4'; Carlos Vasquez 22'		Felix Miranda O.G 69'; Dellon Torres 80'; Ashley Torres 90+'

Norman Broaster Stadium, San Ignacio

14 April 2013
16:00

Police United	1 – 0	Verdes FC
Devon Makin 34'

MCC Grounds, Belize City

==== Round 13 ====
20 April 2013
19:30

Verdes FC	1 – 0	San Felipe Barcelona
Julio Ayala 76'

Marshalleck Stadium, Benque Viejo del Carmen

21 April 2013
15:30

Belize Defence Force	2 – 1	Police United
Shane Flores 31', 55'		Trevor Lennan 88'

Norman Broaster Stadium, San Ignacio

21 April 2013
15:30

Placencia Assassins	2 – 1	Belmopan Bandits
Ashley Torres 44'; Kareem Haylock 71'		Jeromy James 89'

Placencia Football Field, Placencia

21 April 2013
16:00

FC Belize	4 – 0	San Ignacio United
Stephen Baizer 25', 31', 57'; Avian Crawford 68'

MCC Grounds, Belize City

==== Round 14 ====
27 April 2013
19:30

Belmopan Bandits	5 – 1	San Ignacio United
Dennis Serano 2'; Brandon Peyrefitte 5', 54'; Jeromy James 47', 90+'		Carlos Vasquez 90'

Isidoro Beaton Stadium, Belmopan

27 April 2013
19:30

Police United	2 – 2	San Felipe Barcelona
Daniel Jimenez 45+'; Evan Mariano 52'		Deris Benavides 17' (pen.), 29' (pen.)

MCC Grounds, Belize City

28 April 2013
15:30

Belize Defence Force	3 – 1	Verdes FC
Tyrone Pandy 53', 71'; Harrison Tasher 56'		Emmanuel Martinez 85'

Norman Broaster Stadium, San Ignacio

28 April 2013
15:30

Placencia Assassins	3 – 0	FC Belize
Ashley Torres 14'; Alexander Peters 51'; Bernard Linarez 80'

Placencia Football Field, Placencia

=== Playoffs ===
Semi-finals
1	Belmopan Bandits	0	0	0
4	FC Belize	1	0	1
2	Belize Defence Force	1	1	2
3	Police United	3	2	5

Finals
4	FC Belize	0	1	1
3	Police United	1	1	2

==== Semi-finals ====
Game One

4 May 2013
19:30

Police United	3 – 1	Belize Defence Force
Amin August Jr. 4', 90+'; Trevor Lennan 90+'		Tyrone Pandy 11'

FFB Stadium, Belmopan

5 May 2013
16:00

FC Belize	1 – 0	Belmopan Bandits
Avian Crawford 2'

MCC Grounds, Belize City

Game Two

11 May 2013
19:30

Belmopan Bandits	0 – 0	FC Belize

Isidoro Beaton Stadium, Belmopan

12 May 2013
15:30

Belize Defence Force	1 – 2	Police United
Byron Usher 60'		Daniel Jimenez 50', 88'

Norman Broaster Stadium, San Ignacio

==== Finals ====
Game One

19 May 2013
16:00

FC Belize	0 – 1	Police United
		Andres Makin Jr. 62'

MCC Grounds, Belize City

Game Two

25 May 2013
20:00

Police United	1 – 1	FC Belize
Daniel Jimenez 73'		Michael Hernandez 3'

FFB Stadium, Belmopan

2012–13 closing season champions

1st title

=== Season statistics ===
==== Top scorers ====
Rank	Player	Team	Goals
1	(Belize) Jeromy James	Belmopan Bandits	9
1	(Belize) Deon McCaulay	Belmopan Bandits	9
3	(Belize) Daniel Jimenez	Police United	8
4	(Belize) Deris Benavides	San Felipe Barcelona	7
4	(Belize) Harrison Tasher	Belize Defence Force	7
6	(Belize) Shane Flores	Belize Defence Force	5
6	(Belize) Ashley Torres	Placencia Assassins	5
8	(Belize) Amin August Jr.	Police United	4
8	(Belize) Julio Ayala	Verdes FC	4
8	(Belize) Clifton West	San Felipe Barcelona	4

(*) Please note playoff goals are included.

==== Hat tricks ====
Player	For	Against	Result	Date
(Belize) Deon McCaulay	Belmopan Bandits	Police United	4–0 (A)	3 April 2013
(Belize) Harrison Tasher	Belize Defence Force	San Felipe Barcelona	6–0 (A)	14 April 2013
(Belize) Stephen Baizer	FC Belize	San Ignacio United	4–0 (H)	21 April 2013

=== Awards ===
In the post-game ceremonies of the final game of the season, the Football Federation of Belize President, Ruperto Vicente and the Premier League of Belize Commissioner, Myito Perdomoto delivered the trophies and individual awards for both regular season and the playoffs for the 2012-13 closing season.

Award	Recipient	Team
Most Goals	(Belize) Jeromy James	Belmopan Bandits
Most Goals	(Belize) Deon McCaulay	Belmopan Bandits
MVP (Regular Season)	(Belize) Glenford Chimilio	FC Belize
MVP (Playoff)	(Belize) Daniel Jimenez	Police United
Best Forward	(Belize) Deon McCaulay	Belmopan Bandits
Best Midfielder	(Belize) Denmark Casey Jr.	Belmopan Bandits
Best Defender	(Belize) Leon Cadle	FC Belize
Best Goalkeeper	(Belize) Glenford Chimilio	FC Belize
Rookie	(Belize) Carlton Thomas	FC Belize
Manager	(Belize) Alford Grinage	Police United
Coach	(Belize) Marvin Ottley	FC Belize
