= 2012 Premier League of Belize =

Premier League of Belize
- Season: 2012
- Dates: 11 February 2012 – 12 May 2012
- Champions: Placencia Assassins
- Matches: 66
- Goals: 191 (2.89 per match)
- Top goalscorer: Jesse Smith (8)
- Biggest home win: Belize Defence Force 7-0 World FC (11 March 2012)
- Biggest away win: World FC 0-5 Belize Defence Force (14 April 2012)
- Highest scoring: Hankook Verdes 7-1 Paradise/Freedom Fighters (5 April 2012)
- Longest winning run: Belize Defence Force & Police United (6)
- Longest unbeaten run: Police United (12)
- Longest winless run: World FC (10)
- Longest losing run: World FC (6)

The 2012 Premier League of Belize was the first season of the highest competitive football league in Belize, after it was founded in 2011. The season commenced on 11 February 2012.

== League formation ==
In October 2011 teams were invited to apply for membership for the new Premier League of Belize. In early January 2012 it was announced that there will be 12 teams competing in the inaugural season. There were 6 teams from the North Zone and 6 teams from the South Zone. Each team played teams in their zone twice, with the top 2 teams from each zone advancing to the playoffs.

== Teams ==
=== North Zone ===
Team	City	Stadium
Belize Defence Force	San Ignacio	Norman Broaster Stadium
FC Belize	Belize City	MCC Grounds
Juventus	Orange Walk Town	People's Stadium
San Felipe Barcelona	San Felipe	San Felipe Football Field
San Pedro Seadogs	San Pedro	San Pedro Municipal Stadium & MCC Grounds
World FC	San Ignacio	Norman Broaster Stadium

=== South Zone ===
Team	City	Stadium
Belmopan Bandits	Belmopan	Isidoro Beaton Stadium
Hankook Verdes	Benque Viejo del Carmen	Marshalleck Stadium
Paradise/Freedom Fighters	Punta Gorda	Toledo Union Field
Placencia Assassins	Placencia	Placencia Football Field
Police United	Belize City	MCC Grounds
San Ignacio United	San Ignacio	Norman Broaster Stadium

== League table ==
=== North Zone ===
Pos	Team	Pld	W	D	L	GF	GA	GD	Pts	Qualification
1	Belize Defence Force	10	7	2	1	24	5	+19	23	Qualification to the Playoffs
2	FC Belize	10	5	4	1	12	5	+7	19	Qualification to the Playoffs
3	San Pedro Seadogs	10	4	3	3	20	15	+5	15	
4	San Felipe Barcelona	10	4	3	3	14	16	−2	15	
5	Juventus	10	3	1	6	14	18	−4	10	
6	World FC	10	0	1	9	9	34	−25	1	

Source: Soccerway
Rules for classification: 1) points; 2) goal difference; 3) number of goals scored.

=== South Zone ===
Pos	Team	Pld	W	D	L	GF	GA	GD	Pts	Qualification
1	Police United	10	9	1	0	23	3	+20	28	Qualification to the Playoffs
2	Placencia Assassins	10	6	2	2	20	8	+12	20	Qualification to the Playoffs
3	San Ignacio United	10	3	4	3	11	12	−1	13	
4	Paradise/Freedom Fighters	10	2	3	5	13	20	−7	9	
5	Belmopan Bandits	10	1	4	5	6	13	−7	7	
6	Hankook Verdes	10	2	0	8	11	28	−17	6	

Source: Soccerway
Rules for classification: 1) points; 2) goal difference; 3) number of goals scored.

== Results ==
=== Round 1 ===
North Zone

11 February 2012
19:30

Belize Defence Force	2 – 2	San Pedro Seadogs
Byron Usher 43'; Harrison Tasher 90+2'		Jesse Smith 10'; Kenny Witzel 23'

Norman Broaster Stadium, San Ignacio

12 February 2012
14:30

San Felipe Barcelona	2 – 2	Juventus
Oscar Acevedo 75'; Christopher Hendricks 90+2'		Osmar Duran 40', 85'

San Felipe Football Field, San Felipe

12 February 2012
16:00

FC Belize	1 – 0	World FC
Jeromy James 24'

MCC Grounds, Belize City

South Zone

11 February 2012
19:30

Police United	1 – 0	Placencia Assassins
Orlando Jimenez 48'

MCC Grounds, Belize City

12 February 2012
16:00

Hankook Verdes	0 – 1	Belmopan Bandits
		Alden Coleman 39'

Marshalleck Stadium, Benque Viejo del Carmen

12 February 2012
16:00

San Ignacio United	1 – 0	Paradise/Freedom Fighters
Amin August Jr. 32'

Norman Broaster Stadium, San Ignacio

=== Round 2 ===
North Zone

18 February 2012
19:30

Belize Defence Force	2 – 0	Juventus
Marlon Meza 85'; Richard Jimenez 87'

Norman Broaster Stadium, San Ignacio

19 February 2012
15:30

San Felipe Barcelona	1 – 1	FC Belize
Oscar Acevedo 62'		Jeromy James 66'

San Felipe Football Field, San Felipe

19 February 2012
15:30

San Pedro Seadogs	4 – 2	World FC
Kenny Witzel 49' (pen.), 57'; Francisco Mejia 73'; Jesse Smith 90+2'		Onri Meza 71'; Carlos Vasquez 85'

MCC Grounds, Belize City

South Zone

19 February 2012
16:00

Paradise/Freedom Fighters	0 – 2	Police United
		Lennox Castillo 28'; Orlando Jimenez 73'

Toledo Union Field, Punta Gorda

19 February 2012
16:00

Placencia Assassins	4 – 0	Hankook Verdes
Zerrick Torres 7'; Ernie Whyte 18'; Luis Torres 70', 90'

Placencia Football Field, Placencia

19 February 2012
16:00

San Ignacio United	1 – 1	Belmopan Bandits
Seannon Defour 63'		Woodrow West 57' (pen.)

Norman Broaster Stadium, San Ignacio

=== Round 3 ===
North Zone

25 February 2012
19:30

World FC	0 – 3	Juventus
		Osmar Duran 23', 50', 58'

Norman Broaster Stadium, San Ignacio

26 February 2012
15:30

San Felipe Barcelona	1 – 0	Belize Defence Force
Gabriel Perez 50'

San Felipe Football Field, San Felipe

26 February 2012
16:00

FC Belize	0 – 0	San Pedro Seadogs

MCC Grounds, Belize City

South Zone

25 February 2012
19:30

Belmopan Bandits	0 – 1	Police United
		Devon Makin 79'

Isidoro Beaton Stadium, Belmopan

25 February 2012
19:30

Hankook Verdes	1 – 2	San Ignacio United
Julian Maldonado 90+4'		Victor Morales 6', 76'

Marshalleck Stadium, Benque Viejo del Carmen

26 February 2012
16:00

Placencia Assassins	5 – 1	Paradise/Freedom Fighters
Elias Donaire 13'; Ashley Torres 20'; Dennis Serano 34'; Zerrick Torres 47'; Rollin Burgess 82'		Wilmer Garcia 90+4'

Placencia Football Field, Placencia

=== Round 4 ===
North Zone

3 March 2012
19:30

World FC	3 – 3	San Felipe Barcelona
Belhem Guzman 15'; Joel Guzman 23'; Joshua Richards 80'		Deris Benavides 39', 45+' (pen.); Eliazar Itza 49'

Norman Broaster Stadium, San Ignacio

4 March 2012
16:00

FC Belize	1 – 1	Belize Defence Force
David Ramos 19'		Erwin Flores 79'

MCC Grounds, Belize City

4 March 2012
16:00

Juventus	4 – 0	San Pedro Seadogs
Freddy Tun 57'; Andrew Allen 72'; Orvin Wade 86'; Oliver Hendricks 88'

People's Stadium, Orange Walk Town

South Zone

3 March 2012
19:30

Belmopan Bandits	0 – 0	Placencia Assassins

Isidoro Beaton Stadium, Belmopan

3 March 2012
19:30

Police United	0 – 0	San Ignacio United

MCC Grounds, Belize City

4 March 2012
16:00

Paradise/Freedom Fighters	6 – 0	Hankook Verdes
Alexander Peters 34', 39', 41', 55'; Elio Ramirez 23', 54'

Toledo Union Field, Punta Gorda

=== Round 5 ===
North Zone

11 March 2012
15:30

San Felipe Barcelona	2 – 1	San Pedro Seadogs
Harvey Cruz 71'; Oscar Acevedo 84'		Jesse Smith 21'

San Felipe Football Field, San Felipe

11 March 2012
16:00

Belize Defence Force	7 – 0	World FC
Paul Nunez 13'; Denmark Casey Jr. 42'; David Trapp 48', 82'; Daniel Jimenez 55', 89'; Harrison Tasher 59'

Norman Broaster Stadium, San Ignacio

11 March 2012
16:00

FC Belize	2 – 0	Juventus
Jeromy James 27'; Dalton Cayetano 73'

MCC Grounds, Belize City

South Zone

10 March 2012
19:30

Hankook Verdes	0 – 3	Police United
		Orlando Jimenez 42'; Devon Makin 56'; Evan Mariano 68'

Marshalleck Stadium, Benque Viejo del Carmen

10 March 2012
19:30

San Ignacio United	1 – 2	Placencia Assassins
Felix Miranda 9'		Ashley Torres 69', 79' (pen.)

Norman Broaster Stadium, San Ignacio

11 March 2012
16:00

Paradise/Freedom Fighters	1 – 1	Belmopan Bandits
Lisbey Castillo 15'		Jacinto Bermudez 37'

Toledo Union Field, Punta Gorda

=== Round 6 ===
North Zone

17 March 2012
19:30

World FC	0 – 2	FC Belize
		Jeromy James 57'; David Ramos 80'

Norman Broaster Stadium, San Ignacio

18 March 2012
15:30

San Pedro Seadogs	0 – 3	Belize Defence Force
		Richard Jimenez 43'; Harrison Tasher 64', 77'

MCC Grounds, Belize City

18 March 2012
16:00

Juventus	0 – 1	San Felipe Barcelona
		Eliazar Itza 5' (pen.)

People's Stadium, Orange Walk Town

South Zone

17 March 2012
19:30

Hankook Verdes	2 – 1	Belmopan Bandits
Julian Maldonado 80'; Jamie Lozano 82'		Floyd Jones 20'

Marshalleck Stadium, Benque Viejo del Carmen

18 March 2012
16:00

Paradise/Freedom Fighters	1 – 1	San Ignacio United
Ralph Flores 9'		Ismael Thompson 22'

Toledo Union Field, Punta Gorda

18 March 2012
16:00

Placencia Assassins	1 – 2	Police United
Ashley Torres 37'		Lennox Castillo 42'; Evan Mariano 51'

Placencia Football Field, Placencia

=== Round 7 ===
North Zone

24 March 2012
19:30

World FC	2 – 3	San Pedro Seadogs
Carlos Vasquez 35'; Richard Carrillo 68'		Kent Gabourel 39'; Francisco Mejia 45+', 70'

Norman Broaster Stadium, San Ignacio

25 March 2012
16:00

FC Belize	1 – 0	San Felipe Barcelona
Jermmy Bermudez 90+'

MCC Grounds, Belize City

25 March 2012
16:00

Juventus	0 – 1	Belize Defence Force
		Richard Jimenez 65'

People's Stadium, Orange Walk Town

South Zone

24 March 2012
19:30

Belmopan Bandits	1 – 1	San Ignacio United
Jacinto Bermudez 40'		Amin August Jr. 41' (pen.)

Isidoro Beaton Stadium, Belmopan

24 March 2012
19:30

Hankook Verdes	0 – 2	Placencia Assassins
		Gary Young 50'; Rollin Burgess 57'

Marshalleck Stadium, Benque Viejo del Carmen

24 March 2012
19:30

Police United	2 – 1	Paradise/Freedom Fighters
Evan Mariano 45', 62'		Delroy Flores 30'

MCC Grounds, Belize City

=== Round 8 ===
North Zone

31 March 2012
19:30

Belize Defence Force	2 – 1	San Felipe Barcelona
David Trapp 48' (pen.); Erwin Flores 90'		Jaziz Wicab 4'

Norman Broaster Stadium, San Ignacio

1 April 2012
15:30

San Pedro Seadogs	0 – 0	FC Belize

San Pedro Municipal Stadium, San Pedro

1 April 2012
16:00

Juventus	3 – 0	World FC
Freddy Tun 57'; Ernell Pott 83'; Dean Flowers 86'

People's Stadium, Orange Walk Town

South Zone

31 March 2012
19:30

Police United	3 – 0	Belmopan Bandits
Lennox Castillo 6'; Trevor Lennan 53', 89'

MCC Grounds, Belize City

1 April 2012
16:00

Paradise/Freedom Fighters	1 – 1	Placencia Assassins
Tarrel Flores 78'		Rollin Burgess 10'

Toledo Union Field, Punta Gorda

1 April 2012
16:00

San Ignacio United	2 – 1	Hankook Verdes
Victor Morales 39'; Ismael Thompson 59'		Miguel Aguilar 77'

Norman Broaster Stadium, San Ignacio

=== Round 9 ===
North Zone

8 April 2012
15:30

San Felipe Barcelona	3 – 2	World FC
Eliazar Itza 3'; Christopher Hendricks 29'; Javier Habet O.G 42'		Carlos Vasquez 21'; Javier Habet 63'

San Felipe Football Field, San Felipe

8 April 2012
15:30

San Pedro Seadogs	6 – 0	Juventus
Jesse Smith 2', 12', 31'; Francisco Mejia 16'; Ethnie Figueroa 21'; Kenny Witzel 89'

San Pedro Municipal Stadium, San Pedro

8 April 2012
16:00

Belize Defence Force	1 – 0	FC Belize
Deon McCaulay 49'

Norman Broaster Stadium, San Ignacio

South Zone

5 April 2012
19:00

Hankook Verdes	7 – 1	Paradise/Freedom Fighters
Julio Ayala 5', 32'; Julian Maldonado 10', 20', 68', 90+3'; Jose Monroy 25'		Leonard Valdez 54'

Marshalleck Stadium, Benque Viejo del Carmen

7 April 2012
19:30

Placencia Assassins	3 – 1	Belmopan Bandits
Luis Torres 57'; Ernie Whyte 63'; Ashley Torres 72'		Ronaldo Alvarez 88'

Placencia Football Field, Placencia

7 April 2012
19:30

San Ignacio United	1 – 3	Police United
Victor Morales 2'		Andres Makin Jr. 45'; Trevor Lennan 63'; Lennox Castillo 72'

Norman Broaster Stadium, San Ignacio

=== Round 10 ===
North Zone

14 April 2012
19:30

World FC	0 – 5	Belize Defence Force
		Marlon Meza 22', 84'; Richard Jimenez 51'; Harrison Tasher 66'; Michael Martinez 70'

Norman Broaster Stadium, San Ignacio

15 April 2012
15:30

San Pedro Seadogs	4 – 0	San Felipe Barcelona
Jesse Smith 27', 78'; Francisco Mejia 61'; Ethnie Figueroa 84'

San Pedro Municipal Stadium, San Pedro

15 April 2012
16:00

Juventus	2 – 4	FC Belize
Clifton West 2'; Osmar Duran 65' (pen.)		Jermmy Bermudez 56'; Francisco Briceno 60'; Jeromy James 70'; Carlton Rogers 90+6'

People's Stadium, Orange Walk Town

South Zone

14 April 2012
19:30

Belmopan Bandits	0 – 1	Paradise/Freedom Fighters
		Ralph Flores 34'

Isidoro Beaton Stadium, Belmopan

14 April 2012
19:30

Police United	6 – 0	Hankook Verdes
Oswald Young 7', 45'; Lennox Castillo 10', 57'; Trevor Lennan 42'; Sean Mas 65'

MCC Grounds, Belize City

15 April 2012
16:00

Placencia Assassins	2 – 1	San Ignacio United
Seannon Defour O.G 48'; Leomar Leslie 68'		Evral Trapp 90+2'

Placencia Football Field, Placencia

== Playoffs ==
Semi-Finals
N1	Belize Defence Force	0	2 (2)	2
S2	Placencia Assassins	0	2 (4)	2
S1	Police United	2	1	3
N2	FC Belize	2	0	2

Finals
S2	Placencia Assassins	2	1	3
S1	Police United	1	1	2

=== Semi-finals ===
Game One

22 April 2012
16:00

FC Belize	2 – 2	Police United
Jeromy James 1'; Cristobal Gilharry 60' (pen.)		Bernard Linarez 23'; Ivor Arriola O.G 29'

MCC Grounds, Belize City

22 April 2012
16:00

Placencia Assassins	0 – 0	Belize Defence Force

Placencia Football Field, Placencia

Game Two

28 April 2012
16:00

Belize Defence Force	2 – 2 (a.e.t.)	Placencia Assassins
Daniel Jimenez 80'; Marlon Meza 111'		Dellon Torres 14'; Zerrick Torres 97'
Penalties
Marlon Meza (penalty scored); Daniel Jimenez (penalty missed); Harrison Tasher (penalty scored); Khalil Velasquez (penalty missed)	2 – 4	(penalty scored) Zerrick Torres; (penalty scored) Luis Torres; (penalty scored) Rollin Burgess; (penalty scored) Ashley Torres

Norman Broaster Stadium, San Ignacio

28 April 2012
19:30

Police United	1 – 0	FC Belize
Trevor Lennan 37'

FFB Stadium, Belmopan

=== Finals ===
Game One

5 May 2012
19:30

Placencia Assassins	2 – 1	Police United
Luis Torres 35'; Ashley Torres 43'		Evan Mariano 84'

Michael Ashcroft Stadium, Independence

Game Two

12 May 2012
19:30

Police United	1 – 1	Placencia Assassins
Evan Mariano 90+2'		Elias Donaire 12'

FFB Stadium, Belmopan

2012 champions

1st title

== Season statistics ==
=== Top scorers ===
Rank	Player	Team	Goals
1	(Belize) Jesse Smith	San Pedro Seadogs	8
2	(Belize) Lennox Castillo	Police United	6
2	(Belize) Osmar Duran	Juventus	6
2	(Belize) Jeromy James	FC Belize	6
2	(Belize) Julian Maldonado	Hankook Verdes	6
2	(Belize) Evan Mariano	Police United	6
2	(Belize) Ashley Torres	Placencia Assassins	6
8	(Belize) Trevor Lennan	Police United	5
8	(Honduras) Francisco Mejia	San Pedro Seadogs	5
8	(Belize) Harrison Tasher	Belize Defence Force	5

(*) Please note playoff goals are included.

=== Hat-tricks ===
Player	For	Against	Result	Date
(Belize) Osmar Duran	Juventus	World FC	3–0 (A)	25 February 2012
(Belize) Alexander Peters^{4}	Paradise/Freedom Fighters	Hankook Verdes	6–0 (H)	4 March 2012
(Belize) Julian Maldonado^{4}	Hankook Verdes	Paradise/Freedom Fighters	7–1 (H)	5 April 2012
(Belize) Jesse Smith	San Pedro Seadogs	Juventus	6–0 (H)	8 April 2012

- ^{4} Player scored 4 goals
