= List of Premier League of Belize stadiums =

The following is a list of Premier League of Belize stadiums that have hosted a Premier League match since its inception in 2012.

Following the 2012 Premier League, there have been a total of eleven stadiums that have hosted a Premier League match.

== Stadiums ==
Key
**Bold**	Hosted a match during the 2011–12 season
Italics	Stadium has been demolished

Stadium	Club(s)	Location	Opened	Closed	Capacity
FFB Field	TBD	Belmopan City	2011	N/A	3,000
Isidoro Beaton Stadium	Belmopan Bandits	Belmopan City	TBD	N/A	2,500
Marshalleck Stadium	Hankook Verdes	Benque Viejo del Carmen	TBD	N/A	2,000
MCC Grounds	FC Belize	Belize City	TBD	N/A	
Michael Ashcroft Stadium	TBD	Independence	TBD	N/A	2,000
Norman Broaster Stadium	San Ignacio United	San Ignacio Cayo	TBD	N/A	2,000
People's Stadium	Juventus (Belize)	Orange Walk	TBD	N/A	
Placencia Football Field	Placencia Assassin	Placencia	TBD	N/A	
San Felipe Football Field	San Felipe Barcelona	San Felipe		N/A	
San Pedro Municipal Stadium	San Pedro Seadogs	San Pedro	TBD	N/A	
Toledo Union Field	Paradise/Freedom Fighters	Punta Gorda	TBD	N/A	
