= 2007–08 Belize Premier Football League =

The 2007–08 season of the Belize Premier Football League, otherwise known as the RFG Insurance Cup, began on September 30, 2007 and concluded in April 2008. FC Belize of Belize City entered as defending champions.

Hankook Verdes won the title and qualified for the 2008–09 CONCACAF Champions League.

== League tables ==
=== Regular season ===
Pos	Team	Pld	W	D	L	GF	GA	GD	Pts
1	Hankook Verdes United (San Ignacio)	16	7	6	3	26	17	+9	27
2	FC Belize (Belize City)	16	8	3	5	29	22	+7	27
3	Wagiya (Dangriga)	16	7	5	4	29	24	+5	26
4	Defence Force (Belize City)	16	6	8	2	18	14	+4	26
5	San Pedro Dolphins (San Pedro Town)	16	6	6	4	20	18	+2	24
6	Georgetown Ibayani (Independence)	16	5	4	7	28	32	−4	19
7	Juventus (Orange Walk)	16	5	2	9	31	32	−1	17
8	Revolutionary Conquerors (Dangriga)	16	3	6	7	25	32	−7	15
9	Santel's (Santa Elena)	16	4	2	10	16	31	−15	14

=== Semifinal round ===
Pos	Team	Pld	W	D	L	GF	GA	GD	Pts
1	Hankook Verdes United (San Ignacio)	6	4	1	1	8	5	+3	13
2	Defence Force (Belize City)	6	3	2	1	8	5	+3	11
3	FC Belize (Belize City)	6	3	1	2	8	5	+3	10
4	Wagiya (Dangriga)	6	0	0	6	4	13	−9	0

== Results/fixtures ==
=== Week 1 ===
September 30:

- MCC Grounds: FC Belize 1-2 Santel's SC
- Carl Ramos Stadium: Revolutionary Conquerors 1-1 San Pedro Dolphins
- Norman Broaster Stadium: Hankook Verdes United 1-2 Wagiya

October 4:

- Orange Walk People's Stadium: Juventus 0-1 Defence Force (rescheduled from September 30 after call-off due to rain)

Georgetown Ibayani: bye

=== Week 2 ===
October 6:

- MCC: Defence Force 0-2 FC Belize

October 7:

- Norman Broaster: Santel's 1-2 Juventus
- Ambergris: San Pedro 0-1 Verdes
- Carl Ramos: Wagiya 3-1 Georgetown

Revolutionary Conquerors: bye

=== Week 3 ===
October 13:

- Georgetown 1-1 San Pedro
- FC Belize 1-1 Wagiya

October 14:

- Verdes 0-0 Defence Force
- Conquerors 1-2 Santel's

Juventus: bye

=== Week 4 ===
- Defence Force 1-1 Conquerors
- Santels 2-1 Ibayani
- San Pedro 1-1 FC Belize
- Juventus 5-1 Wagiya

Verdes: bye

=== Week 5 ===
October 27:

- Michael Ashcroft: Ibayani 2-1 Verdes
- People's Stadium: Juventus 0-1 San Pedro

October 28:

- Carl Ramos: Conquerors 4-1 FC Belize
- MCC: Defence Force 1-0 Santels

Wagiya: bye

=== Week 6 ===
November 3:

- Michael Ashcroft: Georgetown 0-2 Conquerors

November 4:

- Norman Broaster: Santel's 0-2 Verdes
- Carl Ramos: Wagiya 0-0 Defence Force
- MCC: FC Belize 2-0 Juventus

San Pedro: bye

=== Week 7 ===
- Norman Broaster, November 10: Santel's 1-4 Wagiya. Frazier 71'-Tasher 31', 63'; Castillo 65', Archer 89'.
- People's Stadium, November 11: Juventus 2-2 Georgetown. O. Hendricks 31', F. Tun 57'-I. Castillo 51', B. Burgess 89'.
- Carl Ramos, November 11: Conquerors 2-3 Verdes. E. Kuylen 18', K. Haylock 43'-D. Jimenez 3', 24', 75'.
- MCC, November 11: Defence Force 1-1 San Pedro. D. McCaulay 41'-R.G. Hicks 62'.
- FC Belize: bye

=== Week 8 ===
November 17:

- Michael Ashcroft: Ibayani 0-1 FC Belize

November 18:

- Ambergris Stadium: Dolphins 2-0 Santels'
- Norman Broaster: Verdes 2-1 Juventus
- Carl Ramos: Conquerors 2-2 Wagiya
- Defence Force: bye

=== Week 9 ===
November 24:

- Michael Ashcroft: Ibayani 2-3 Defence Force

November 25:

- Ambergris Stadium: Dolphins 0-0 Wagiya
- Carl Ramos: Conquerors 2-3 Juventus
- MCC: FC Belize 2-2 Verdes
- Santel's: bye

=== Week 10 ===
December 1:

- Norman Broaster: Santel's 5-1 Conquerors

December 2:

- People's Stadium: Juventus 1-0 FC Belize
- Carl Ramos: Wagiya 2-4 Verdes
- MCC: BDF 1-1 Georgetown

Bye: San Pedro Dolphins

=== Week 11 ===
December 9:

- Ambergris Stadium: San Pedro 4-2 Juventus
- Norman Broaster: Verdes 2-2 Georgetown
- Carl Ramos: Wagiya 0-0 Santel's
- MCC: FC Belize 2-1 Defence Force
- Bye: Revolutionary Conquerors

=== Week 12 ===
December 15:

- Santel's vs F.C. Belize, Norman Broaster, 7:30 pm
- George Town Ibayani vs Wagiya, Michael Ashcroft, 7:30 pm

December 16:

- San Pedro Dolphins vs Revolutionary Conquerors, Ambergris Stad., 2:30 pm
- Belize Defense Force vs Hankook Verdes, MCC Grounds, 4:00 pm

Resting: Suga Boys Juventus Note: These games were postponed. Updated results will be posted.

=== Week 13 ===
December 22:

- George Town Ibayani 3-2 Santel's

December 23:

- Suga Boys Juventus 2-5 Wagiya
- Revolutionary Conquerors 2-2 Belize Defence Force
- F.C. Belize 5-1 San Pedro Dolphins

Resting: Hankook Verdes

=== Week 14 ===
December 30:

- San Pedro Dolphins 1-2 George Town Ibayani
- Hankook Verdes 1-1 Revolutionary Conquerors
- Wagiya 3-2 F.C. Belize
- Belize Defence Force 3-2 Suga Boys Juventus

Resting: Santel's

=== Week 15 ===
January 5, 2008:

- Santel's vs San Pedro Dolphins, Norman Broaster, 7:30 pm

(RAINED OUT; postponed to Jan. 10, 2008) January 6, 2008:

- Suga Boys Juventus 0-3 Hankook Verdes
- Revolutionary Conquerors 0-2 Wagiya
- F.C. Belize 3-4 George Town Ibayani

== Upcoming Fixtures ==
=== Week 16 ===
January 12, 2008:

- Santel's vs Hankook Verdes, Norman Broaster, 7:30 pm'THE WESTERN DERBY'
- Georgetown Ibayani vs Suga Boys Juventus, Michael Ashcroft, 7:30 pm

January 13, 2008:

- San Pedro Dolphins vs Belize Defence Force, Ambergris, 2:30 pm
- FC Belize vs. Revolutionary Conquerors, MCC, 4:00 pm

== Goalscorers ==
Rank	Player	Team	Goals
1	(Belize) Daniel Jimenez	Verdes	19
2	(Belize) Jerome James	FC Belize	11
3	(Belize) Aaron McLaughlin	Wagiya	8
3	(Belize) Oliver Hendricks	Juventus	8
5	(Belize) Deon McCaulay	Defence Force	7
6	(Belize) Bent Burgess	Georgetown	5
6	(Belize) Lennox Mejia	Conquerors	5
6	(Belize) Anthony Gonzalez	Santel's	5
6	(Belize) Erwin Flores	Defence Force	5
6	(Belize) Ricardo Jimenez	Verdes	5
6	(Belize) Germaine Zuniga	FC Belize	5
6	(Belize) Harrison Tasher	Wagiya	5

- 4: David Trapp, Conquerors; Ramon Hicks, San Pedro.
- 10 players have three goals apiece.
- 11 players have two goals apiece.
- 33 players with one goal each.

== Teams ==
Team name	Established	Home stadium
FC Belize (defending champions)	2004	MCC Grounds
Defence Force	2007	MCC Grounds
Georgetown Ibayani	2007	Michael Ashcroft Stadium, Independence, Belize
Hankook Verdes United	1976	Norman Broaster Stadium, San Ignacio
Suga Boys Juventus	1978	Orange Walk People's Stadium, Orange Walk
Revolutionary Conquerors	2005	Carl Ramos Stadium, Dangriga
Santel's	2006	Norman Broaster Stadium, San Ignacio
San Pedro Dolphins	1997	Ambergris Stadium, San Pedro
Wagiya	2005	Carl Ramos Stadium, Dangriga
