= List of foreign Premier League of Belize players =

This is a list of foreign players in the Premier League of Belize, which began league play in 2002. The following players must meet the following criteria:

1. Have played at least one Premier League game. Players who were signed by Premier League clubs, but only played in lower league, cup and/or international matches, or did not play in any competitive games at all, are not included.
2. Are considered foreign, i.e., outside Belize, if he is not eligible to play for the national team.

More specifically,

- If a player has been capped on international level, the national team is used; if he has been capped by more than one country, the highest level (or the most recent) team is used. These include Belize players with dual citizenship.
- If a player has not been capped on international level, his country of birth is used, except those who were born abroad from Belizeo parents or moved to Belize at a young age, and those who clearly indicated to have switched his nationality to another nation.

Clubs listed are those the player has played at least one Premier League game for. Seasons listed are those the player has played at least one Premier League game in.

In bold: players who have played at least one Premier League game in the current season (), and the clubs they've played for. They include players who have subsequently left the club.

== Brazil ==
- Danilo Marcilo – Belmopan Bandits – 2012–

== El Salvador ==
- Israel Hercules – Belmopan Bandits – 2012–
- Jose Monge – FC Belize – 2012–

== Guatemala ==
- Jamie Brooks – World FC (Belize) – 2012–
- Yorvani Chavez – San Pedro Seadogs – 2012–
- Elio Ramirez – Paradise/Freedom Fighters – 2012–

== France ==
- George Worst – Police United, Belize – 2012–

== Honduras ==
- Ivor Arriola – FC Belize – 2012–
- Oscar Banegas – San Ignacio United – 2012–
- Elias Donaire – Placencia Assassins – 2012–
- Jorge Estrada – FC Belize – 2012–
- Tarrell Flores – Paradise/Freedom Fighters – 2012–
- Edi Giron – San Ignacio United – 2012–
- Francisco Mejia – San Pedro Seadogs – 2012–
- Eric Rodriguez – San Ignacio United – 2012–
- Georgie Welcome - Belmopan Bandits – 2017-2021

== Nigeria ==
- Christian Okonkwo - FC Belize – 2010–
- Rilwan Salawu – Belmopan Bandits – 2017–2018

== Panama ==
- Juan Ramón Solís – Belize Defense Force FC – 2010
