= 2009–10 Belize Premier Football League =

The 2009-10 Belize Premier Football League is the highest competitive football league in Belize, which was founded in 1991. There are two seasons spread over two years, the opening and the closing.

== Closing season ==
Belize Premier Football League
- Season: 2009-10 Closing
- Champions: Belize Defence Force
- Matches: 63
- Goals: 164 (2.6 per match)
- Biggest home win: Belize Defence Force 8-0 Shanaiah Corozal (18 April 2010)
- Biggest away win: Shanaiah Corozal 0-15 Hankook Verdes United (2 May 2010)
- Highest scoring: Shanaiah Corozal 0-15 Hankook Verdes United (2 May 2010)

The closing season started on 13 February 2010 and concluded on 30 May 2010.

=== Regular stage ===
Pos	Team	Pld	W	D	L	GF	GA	GD	Pts	Result
1	Belize Defence Force	14	10	2	2	31	11	+20	32	Final champion
2	Hankook Verdes United	14	8	2	4	33	9	+24	26	
3	Paradise Freedom Fighters	14	8	1	5	24	19	+5	25	
4	FC Belize	14	7	3	4	24	14	+10	24	
5	San Pedro Sea Dogs	13	5	4	4	17	10	+7	19	
6	Georgetown Ibayani	13	5	2	6	18	20	−2	17	Final runner-up
7	BRC Blaze	14	3	1	10	9	24	−15	10	
8	Shanaiah Corozal	14	1	1	12	8	57	−49	4	

The San Pedro Sea Dogs and Georgetown Ibayani game scheduled for 17 March 2010 was not played, therefore that is why only both teams played 13 games.

=== Playoff stage ===
Quarter-finals

Teams ranked 3-6 played a one-off game to gain a place in the Semi-finals, in order to play the top 2 ranked teams from the regular stage.

- Paradise Freedom Fighters lost to Georgetown Ibayani

There is no score available for this game

- FC Belize 1-1 San Pedro Sea Dogs

FC Belize win 4-3 on penalties

Semi-finals

Georgetown Ibayani and FC Belize advanced from the Quarter-finals to play the top 2 ranked teams from the regular stage, Belize Defence Force and Hankook Verdes United.

First Legs:

- Georgetown Ibayani 2-1 Hankook Verdes United
- FC Belize 0-1 Belize Defence Force

Second Legs:

- Hankook Verdes United 2-2 Georgetown Ibayani

Georgetown Ibayani win 4-3 on aggregate

- Belize Defence Force 3-0 FC Belize - FC Belize walked off at 0-0 and therefore lost 3–0

Belize Defence Force win 4-0 on aggregate

Final

The winners of the Caribbean Motors Cup 2010 Spring Season was determined by a 2 legged match between Georgetown Ibayani and Belize Defence Force.

First Leg:

- Georgetown Ibayani 1-2 Belize Defence Force

Second Leg:

- Belize Defence Force 2-0 Georgetown Ibayani

Belize Defence Force win 4-1 on aggregate and subsequently win the league

All stats from the Caribbean Motors Cup 2010 (Closing Season) were found here.
