= Deon McCaulay =

Belizean footballer (born 1987)

Personal information
- Full name: Deon McCaulay
- Date of birth: 20 September 1987 (age 39)
- Place of birth: Belize City, Belize
- Position: Forward

Team information
- Current team: Rome Gladiators
- Number: 9

Senior career*
Years	Team	Apps	(Gls)
2005–2006	Kremandala		
2006–2007	FC Belize		
2007–2009	Belize Defence Force		
2008	Puntarenas		
2008–2009	FC Belize		
2009	Belize Defence Force		
2009–2011	Deportes Savio	25	(4)
2011–2012	R.G. City Boys United		
2013–2014	Belmopan Bandits		
2014	Atlanta Silverbacks	17	(3)
2015–2017	Verdes FC		
2017	Atlanta Silverbacks	1	(2)
2018–2019	Georgia Revolution FC	10	(1)
2021–	Atletico Atlanta		
2021–	Rome Gladiators (indoor)	2	(0)

International career^{‡}
2007–2022	Belize	63	(28)
- * Club domestic league appearances and goals as of 31 March 2022 ‡ National team caps and goals as of 23:51, 14 June 2022 (UTC)

Deon McCaulay (born 20 September 1987) is a Belizean professional footballer who plays as a forward for Atletico Atlanta of the United Premier Soccer League, the Rome Gladiators of the National Indoor Soccer League, and the Belize national team.

== Club career ==
McCaulay has played in Belize for Kremandala, FC Belize and Belize Defence Force; in Costa Rica he had a trial with Puntarenas; he played in Honduras for Deportes Savio from 2009 to 2011. He has also played for Belmopan Bandits in the Premier League of Belize.

In February 2013 he had a trial with the Portland Timbers of Major League Soccer.

In March 2014 he joined the Atlanta Silverbacks of North American Soccer League.

After a two-year spell back in Belize with Verdes FC, McCaulay rejoined the Atlanta Silverbacks in March 2017.

In April 2018, he signed with the Georgia Revolution FC of the National Premier Soccer League.

In November 2020 he signed for Ginga Atlanta. McCaulay was recognized as UPSL national player of the week on 27 November 2020, and on 5 February 2021.

== International career ==
McCaulay made his international debut for Belize in 2007. He was a member of Belize's FIFA World Cup qualifying campaign for the 2010, 2014, 2018 and 2022 editions, and he scored the first goal and first hat-trick of the 2014 FIFA World Cup qualifying campaign. He is Belize's all-time top scorer, with eighteen goals in FIFA World Cup qualifying, as well as two goals at the 2007 UNCAF Nations Cup and one goal at the 2013 Copa Centroamericana. He was also the worldwide top goalscorer in 2014 FIFA World Cup qualification along with Luis Suárez and Robin van Persie with eleven goals. He scored a hat-trick of those eleven in a 5–2 rout of Montserrat in June 2011.

== Career statistics ==
=== International ===
Appearances and goals by national team and year
National team	Year	Apps	Goals
Belize	2007	3	2
Belize	2008	6	2
Belize	2011	11	11
Belize	2013	9	1
Belize	2014	3	1
Belize	2015	4	4
Belize	2016	1	0
Belize	2017	5	1
Belize	2018	4	1
Belize	2019	7	3
Belize	2021	3	1
Belize	2022	7	1
Total		63	28

Scores and results list Belize's goal tally first, score column indicates score after each McCaulay goal.

List of international goals scored by Deon McCaulay
No.	Date	Venue	Opponent	Score	Result	Competition
1	12 February 2007	Estadio Cuscatlán, San Salvador, El Salvador	Nicaragua	1–2	2–4	2007 UNCAF Nations Cup
2	12 February 2007	Estadio Cuscatlán, San Salvador, El Salvador	Nicaragua	2–3	2–4	2007 UNCAF Nations Cup
3	6 February 2008	Estadio Mateo Flores, Guatemala City, Guatemala	Saint Kitts and Nevis	1–0	3–1	2010 FIFA World Cup qualification
4	6 February 2008	Estadio Mateo Flores, Guatemala City, Guatemala	Saint Kitts and Nevis	3–1	3–1	2010 FIFA World Cup qualification
5	15 June 2011	Ato Boldon Stadium, Couva, Trinidad and Tobago	Montserrat	1–0	5–2	2014 FIFA World Cup qualification
6	15 June 2011	Ato Boldon Stadium, Couva, Trinidad and Tobago	Montserrat	4–1	5–2	2014 FIFA World Cup qualification
7	15 June 2011	Ato Boldon Stadium, Couva, Trinidad and Tobago	Montserrat	5–1	5–2	2014 FIFA World Cup qualification
8	17 July 2011	Estadio Olímpico, San Pedro Sula, Honduras	Montserrat	2–1	3–1	2014 FIFA World Cup qualification
9	2 September 2011	Grenada National Stadium, St. Georges, Grenada	Grenada	1–0	3–0	2014 FIFA World Cup qualification
10	2 September 2011	Grenada National Stadium, St. Georges, Grenada	Grenada	3–0	3–0	2014 FIFA World Cup qualification
11	6 September 2011	FFB Field, Belmopan, Belize	Guatemala	1–2	1–2	2014 FIFA World Cup qualification
12	11 October 2011	Estadio Mateo Flores, Guatemala City, Guatemala	Guatemala	1–1	1–3	2014 FIFA World Cup qualification
13	11 November 2011	FFB Field, Belmopan, Belize	Saint Vincent and the Grenadines	1–1	1–1	2014 FIFA World Cup qualification
14	15 November 2011	Arnos Vale Stadium, Kingstown, Saint Vincent and the Grenadines	Saint Vincent and the Grenadines	1–0	2–0	2014 FIFA World Cup qualification
15	15 November 2011	Arnos Vale Stadium, Kingstown, Saint Vincent and the Grenadines	Saint Vincent and the Grenadines	2–0	2–0	2014 FIFA World Cup qualification
16	22 January 2013	Estadio Nacional, San José, Costa Rica	Nicaragua	2–1	2–1	2013 Copa Centroamericana
17	7 September 2014	Cotton Bowl, Dallas, United States	Guatemala	1–2	1–2	2014 Copa Centroamericana
18	11 June 2015	Estadio Olímpico Félix Sánchez, Santo Domingo, Dominican Republic	Dominican Republic	1–0	2–1	2018 FIFA World Cup qualification
19	11 June 2015	Estadio Olímpico Félix Sánchez, Santo Domingo, Dominican Republic	Dominican Republic	2–1	2–1	2018 FIFA World Cup qualification
20	14 June 2015	FFB Stadium, Belmopan, Belize	Dominican Republic	3–0	3–0	2018 FIFA World Cup qualification
21	8 September 2015	FFB Stadium, Belmopan, Belize	Canada	1–1	1–1	2018 FIFA World Cup qualification
22	17 January 2017	Estadio Rommel Fernández, Panama City, Panama	El Salvador	1–3	1–3	2017 Copa Centroamericana
23	7 September 2018	Isidoro Beaton Stadium, Belmopan, Belize	Bahamas	1–0	4–0	2019–20 CONCACAF Nations League qualification
24	1 September 2019	Isidoro Beaton Stadium, Belmopan, Belize	Saint Vincent and the Grenadines	1–0	1–0	Friendly
25	8 September 2019	Isidoro Beaton Stadium, Belmopan, Belize	Grenada	1–0	1–2	2019–20 CONCACAF Nations League B
26	14 November 2019	Isidoro Beaton Stadium, Belmopan, Belize	French Guiana	2–0	2–0	2019–20 CONCACAF Nations League B
27	30 March 2021	Estadio Panamericano, San Cristóbal, Dominican Republic	Turks and Caicos Islands	5–0	5–0	2022 FIFA World Cup qualification
28	1 February 2022	Estadio Nacional, Managua, Nicaragua	Nicaragua	1–1	1–1	Friendly
