= 2012–13 Premier League (disambiguation) =

2012–13 Premier League may refer to a number of professional sports league seasons:

Association football

- 2012–13 Armenian Premier League
- 2012–13 Azerbaijan Premier League
- 2012–13 Premier League of Belize
- 2012–13 Premier League of Bosnia and Herzegovina
- 2012–13 Egyptian Premier League
- 2012–13 Premier League (England)
- 2012–13 Israeli Premier League
- 2012–13 Kuwaiti Premier League
- 2012–13 Lebanese Premier League
- 2012–13 Maltese Premier League
- 2012–13 National Premier League (Jamaica)
- 2012–13 Premier Soccer League (South Africa)
- 2012–13 Russian Premier League
- 2012–13 Scottish Premier League
- 2012–13 Syrian Premier League
- 2012–13 Ukrainian Premier League
- 2012–13 Welsh Premier League
