= San Felipe, Belize =

San Felipe, Belize, may refer to several places:

- San Felipe, Orange Walk
- San Felipe, Toledo, a municipality in Belize
