= Battle of Orange Walk =

1872 battle

- Part of the Caste War of Yucatán
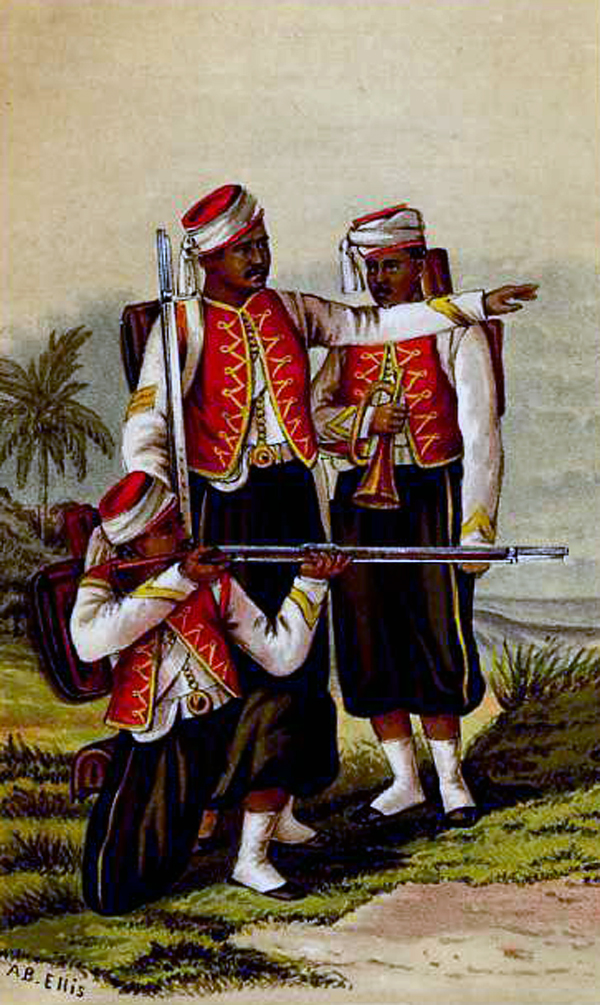
- Soldiers of the British West India Regiment.
Date	1 September 1872
Location	Orange Walk Town, British Honduras
Result	British victory

Belligerents
United Kingdom: British Honduras	Icaiche Maya people

Commanders and leaders
Lieutenant Joseph Graham Smith (WIA); Assistant Surgeon John Dallas Edge	Marcus Canul †

Strength
39 men of the West India Regiment	150–180 men

Casualties and losses
Reportedly 2 killed, 14 severely wounded	Reportedly 30–50 killed

The Battle of Orange Walk took place on 1 September 1872 when a force of Icaiche Maya led by Marcus Canul attacked the town of Orange Walk in Belize. Canul had previously been involved in conflict with the British authorities over infringements of his people's land rights and non-payment of rent and one motive for the raid may have been to seize the district magistrate for ransom. Canul and his men crossed the border from Mexico the day before the battle and were able to reach the town undetected by the British. They launched a surprise attack that caught the small garrison unaware – the British commanders were in the bath at the time the battle started. The British forces – a small detachment of the West India Regiment – successfully defended their barracks building for a number of hours, inflicting heavy casualties on the Maya and fatally wounding Canul. The Maya then withdrew into Mexico.

== Background ==
Marcus Canul was a chief of the Icaiche Maya. The Icaiche were on friendly terms with the government of neighbouring Mexico but had a history of conflict with the colony of British Honduras; Mexico itself had a disputed claim over land in the colony. Canul had fought the British in 1866, capturing for ransom a number of woodcutters working for the British Honduras Company in the Rio Bravo region. Canul and his men routed a detachment of British troops on December 21, 1866, at the Battle of San Pedro Yalbac. In 1867 the British mounted a counter-offensive, equipped with newly-arrived Congreve rockets. This counter-offensive burned down the villages of San Pedro, Santa Teresa, San José, Naranjal, Cerro, Santa Cruz, and Chunbalche. A small force of Icaiche Maya advanced into British Honduras again in 1868 and made demands for rent on land over which they claimed ownership; however Canul disavowed the actions of this force.

Orange Walk Town located around 10 miles (16 km) from the Mexican border in northern British Honduras had its origin as a logging camp on the New River. In 1872 the town had a population of around 1,200 – largely mixed race Native American or mixed race European-Native American workers and a small British garrison.

== Battle ==
On 31 August or early 1 September 1872 Canul led a force of the Maya across the Rio Hondo from Mexico; this has been described as being 150–180 strong with around 100 non-combatant camp followers. On 1 September he launched an attack on Orange Walk, to further his aim of collecting rent payments and returning lands he claimed were seized from his people. A British press report of the time stated that Canul had intended to seize the town's magistrate with the intention of collecting a ransom.

British forces comprised Lieutenant Joseph Graham Smith and 37 men of the West India Regiment, together with the unit's Assistant Surgeon John Dallas Edge. At around 8 am Canul led about 180 armed Maya against the garrison's barracks, a 30-foot (9.1 m) wide and 60-foot (18 m) long structure built from 3" wooden stakes and roofed in palm leaves, that was situated midway between the town and the river. The Maya forces were able to approach the town undetected, a fact which led the British to suspect they had sympathisers in the local population. Canul split his force into three equal portions: one that attacked and looted the town and two that converged upon the barracks. Edge and Smith were out of the barracks bathing at the time of the attack and upon hearing the first shots had to make a desperate rush over the 60 yards (55 m) from their bathtubs to the building. Edge was completely naked and Smith clothed only in his drawers.

Details of the subsequent battle are recorded in the West India regimental history published in 1885, an 1872 report in the Spectator and also in the personal correspondence of Edge; there are differences in some details. According to the Spectator, Smith was shot in the back during the run from his bath. The bullet is said to have struck near both his heart and spinal column and both he and Edge thought the wound to be fatal. Edge states that Smith was incapacitated and that he subsequently took over command of the garrison. The regimental history records instead that Smith and Sergeant Belizario made a dash back to his quarters, braving the Maya cross fire to retrieve the key for the garrison magazine. Belizario then retrieved the portable magazine from an adjoining room and passed the contents through the wall to the garrison, all the while under heavy fire. Smith is then said to have taken up a position in the door of the barracks and returned fire against the Maya when he was struck by a bullet. By Edge's account he ordered the defenders to reinforce the walls of the barracks with their mattresses – which apparently were sufficient to stop bullets; in the regimental history this action is attributed to Smith.

One of the garrison, Private Bidwell, had been on detachment at a commissariat store in the town when the attack occurred. He took position in a compound overlooking the barracks and fired off his ten rounds of ammunition at the Maya. He then ran for the barracks to rejoin his comrades but was mortally wounded in doing so.

The garrison kept up a defence of the structure for some four to six hours, during which time the Maya set fire to the town. At one point two American settlers – Price and Brudrow – joined the battle. Arriving from an outlying ranch they found themselves to the rear of the Maya; by opening fire they were able to cause enough confusion to ride over to the barracks. The Americans advocated a retreat over the river. Edge disagreed, stating that the act would kill Smith and endanger the men – though he would permit the Americans to try on their own. Both Price and Brudrow decided to remain in the barracks. A number of civilian refugees from the town also joined Edge and his men. Many of the others including all the European women and children escaped from the town by boat to nearby San Estevan.

Eventually Canul was mortally wounded and the Maya defeated, reportedly suffering some 30 to 50 men killed and an unknown number of wounded. The survivors escaped into Mexico. British losses were reportedly two men killed and 14 severely wounded. More than 300 bullet holes were recorded in the walls of the barracks.

The morning after the attack a rumour spread that another force of Maya was forming to resume the assault. A British patrol was sent out which found only a scattered few in the bush. Edge claims to have spent the next three days in leading patrols to secure the town and extracting more than 26 bullets from the defenders. A 20-man British relief force arrived on the third day with a more substantial reinforcement arriving on the fourth day.

== Aftermath ==
The battle was the last conflict involving the Maya in British Honduras and also the last serious attack on the colony. The Icaiche Maya thereafter maintained an uneasy peace with the British authorities. The garrison was reinforced by a further 50 men of the West India Regiment from Jamaica on 25 September as a direct result of the attack. In 1874 the British colonial government constructed a fort on the site on the battle.

Lieutenant Smith recovered from his wound and was promoted to command a company of the 97th Regiment. Assistant Surgeon Edge was promoted to Staff Surgeon on 3 December 1872 for his role in the battle and later became a major-general in the Royal Army Medical Corps. Belizario was awarded the Distinguished Conduct Medal.
