= Louisiana Football Field =

Football stadium in Belize

Coordinates: 18.07316°N 88.56188°W

- Interactive map of Louisiana Football Field
- Location: Orange Walk, Belize
- Current use: Association football matches

Louisiana Football Field is a football stadium based in Orange Walk Town, Orange Walk District, Belize. It is home to Juventus F.C., who compete in the Premier League of Belize. Before 2012, the home stadium of the team was Orange Walk People's Stadium.
