= Georgetown Ibayani FC =

Belizean football club

Georgetown Ibayani
- Full name: Georgetown Ibayani Football Club
- Nickname(s): Ibayani
- Founded: 2007
- Ground: Michael Ashcroft Stadium; Independence, Belize
- Capacity: 2,000
- League: Belize Premier Football League
Home colours	Away colours

Georgetown Ibayani is a Belizean football team which currently competes in the Belize Premier Football League (BPFL) of the Football Federation of Belize.

The team is based in the Cayo District.
