= R.G. City Boys United =

Belizean football club

- Full name: Raymond Gentle-City Boys United
- Ground: MCC Grounds; Belize City, Belize

Raymond Gentle-City Boys United is a Belizean football team which currently competes in the Premier League of Belize.

The team is based in Belize City. Their home stadium is MCC Grounds.
