= World FC (Belize) =

Belizean football club

- Full name: World Football Club
- Ground: Norman Broaster Stadium; San Ignacio, Belize

World FC is a Belizean football team which currently competes in the Premier League of Belize.

The team is based in San Ignacio. Their home stadium is Norman Broaster Stadium.

== Current squad ==
Note: Flags indicate national team as defined under FIFA eligibility rules; some limited exceptions apply. Players may hold more than one non-FIFA nationality.

No.	Pos.	Nation	Player
1	GK	(Belize) BLZ	Dustin Juan
2	DF	(Belize) BLZ	Jamaal Smillin
3	DF	(Belize) BLZ	Theodore Lennon
4	FW	(Belize) BLZ	Bader Hegar
5	FW	(Belize) BLZ	Belhem Guzman
6	DF	(Belize) BLZ	Helmut Lemoth
7	DF	(Belize) BLZ	Regis Morris
8	MF	(Belize) BLZ	Joseph Waight (captain)
9	FW	(Belize) BLZ	Richard Carrillo
10	MF	(Belize) BLZ	Carlos Vasquez
11	FW	(Belize) BLZ	Onri Meza
12	MF	(Belize) BLZ	Albert Velasquez
13	MF	(Belize) BLZ	Joshua Richards
14	MF	(Belize) BLZ	Ian Price

No.	Pos.	Nation	Player
15	FW	(Belize) BLZ	Brandon Peyrefitte
16	DF	(Belize) BLZ	Luis Avalos
17	MF	(Belize) BLZ	Dudley Smith
19	MF	(Belize) BLZ	Ricardo Ayala
20	DF	(Belize) BLZ	Gilbert Carrillo
21	MF	(Belize) BLZ	Jerome Beslisle
23	DF	(Belize) BLZ	Javier Habet
24	DF	(Belize) BLZ	Jason Trapp
25	FW	(Belize) BLZ	Joel Guzman
26	MF	(Belize) BLZ	Israel Manzanero
27	FW	(Belize) BLZ	Sanjay Casey
28	DF	(Belize) BLZ	Anthony Morgan
29	DF	(Belize) BLZ	Nigel Cabral
30	GK	(Guatemala) GUA	Jamie Brooks
