= Benque Viejo del Carmen =

Benque Viejo
- Town
- Benque Viejo del Carmen
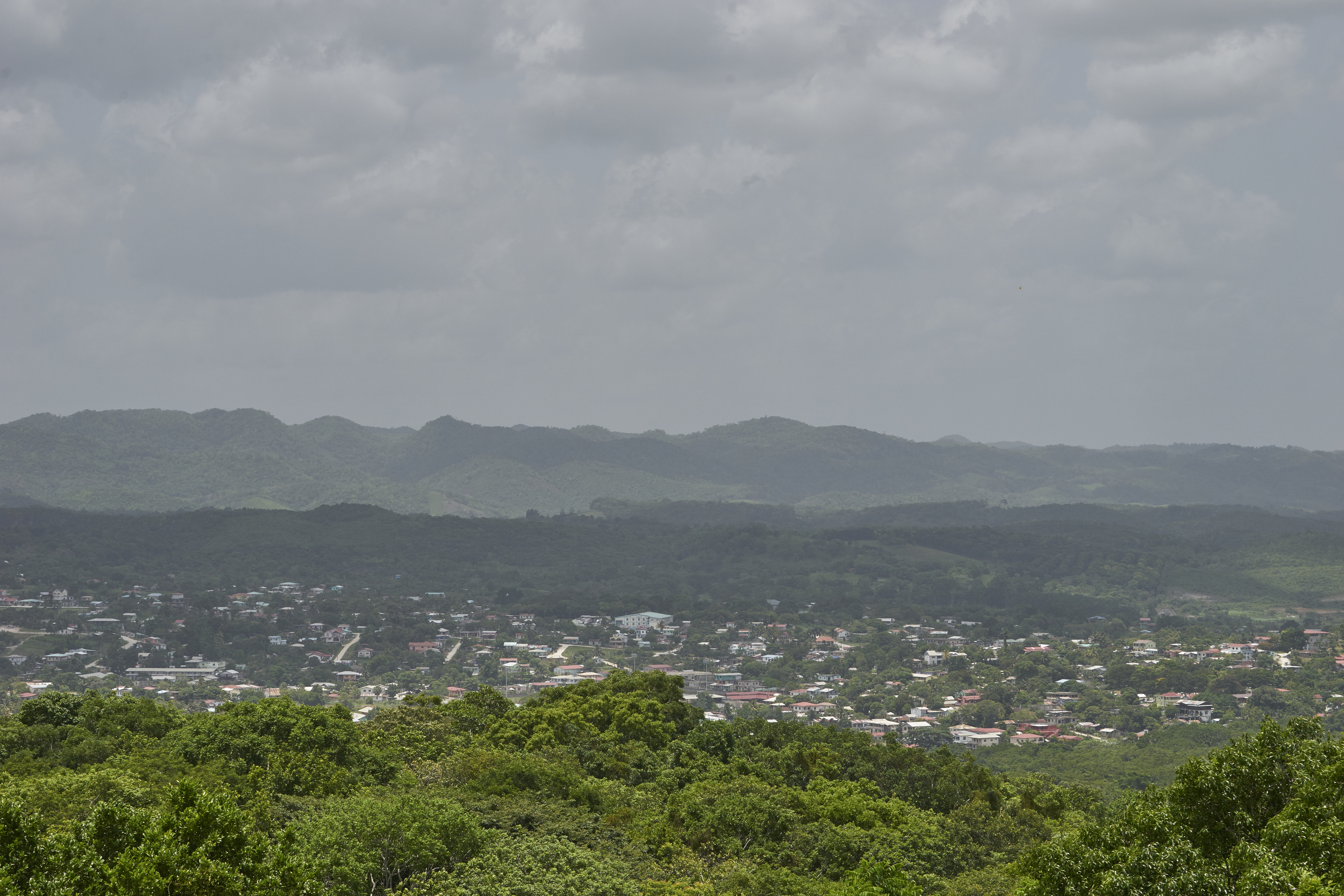
- Benque Viejo del Carmen from north
- Nickname: Benque
- Location within Belize
- Coordinates: 17°04′N 89°08′W
- Country: Belize
- District: Cayo District
- Constituency: Cayo West

Government
  - Mayor: Jorge Antonio Rosales (PUP)
- Elevation: 129 m (423 ft)

Population (2022)
  - Total: 7,020
  - Estimate (2022): 7,020
- Demonym: Benqueño(a)
- Time zone: UTC-6 (Central)
- Climate: Aw
- Website: Official website

Benque Viejo del Carmen, usually shortened to Benque or Benque Viejo, is the westernmost town in Belize. It is located right on the Guatemalan border, across from the Guatemalan town of Melchor de Mencos, and is located 130 km (81 mi) by road west and south of Belize City. The nearby Cayo cities of San Ignacio and Belmopan lie 13 km and 50 km to the east respectively. The Mopan River runs along the town's north and west edges.

== Early development ==
Pre-Colonial & Maya Influence: before the arrival of Spanish-speaking settlers, the Maya civilization had already been present in the area for centuries. The nearby Xunantunich ruins, just a few kilometres from Benque, suggest that this region was part of a thriving Maya trade and ceremonial hub. The Mopan and Yucatec Maya likely lived in scattered settlements along the Mopan River, using the fertile land for farming.

== Arrival of Mestizo and Maya refugees (mid- to late-1800s) ==
The modern town of Benque Viejo del Carmen was established in the mid-to-late 19th century by Mestizo and Maya refugees fleeing the Caste War of Yucatán (1847–1901). This war was a violent conflict in Mexico's Yucatán Peninsula, where the indigenous Maya rebelled against Spanish and Mestizo rule. Many Yucatec Maya and Mestizo families sought safety in British Honduras (now Belize), settling in areas like San Ignacio, Corozal, Orange Walk, and Benque Viejo del Carmen.

During the same period, some Mopan Maya were also fleeing forced labour and military conscription in Guatemala. They crossed into western Belize, where the British colonial government gave them temporary protection, allowing them to settle along the Mopan River.

== Early economy and growth ==
The early settlers of Benque primarily engaged in agriculture, logging, and trade. Chicle tapping (harvesting sap from sapodilla trees for chewing gum production) became a major industry in the late 19th and early 20th centuries. Many men from Benque worked as chicleros, tapping trees in the dense forests of western Belize.

The Mopan River played a key role in trade, providing a natural route for transporting goods such as maize, beans, livestock, and timber. Benque's location near the Guatemalan border also encouraged cross-border trade, a tradition that continues today.

== Religious and cultural influence ==
As the town grew, so did its Catholic identity. The settlers built the Our Lady of Mount Carmel Church, which became the centre of religious and social life. The church was named after the Virgin of Mount Carmel, the town's patron saint. The annual Fiesta de la Virgen del Carmen, celebrated every July, remains one of Benque's most important cultural events.

Traditional marimba music, dances, and festivals became an essential part of Benque's cultural heritage, heavily influenced by Mestizo and Guatemalan traditions.

== Formal recognition and growth in the 20th Century ==
By the early 1900s, Benque had become a well-established town with schools, churches, and local businesses. It was officially recognized as a town in 1904, solidifying its place in Belize's history. The town continued to develop, and its economy remained tied to agriculture, forestry, and cross-border commerce.

== Benque today ==
Despite its small-town charm, Benque has grown into a lively border community with a strong Belizean-Guatemalan cultural blend. The Mopan River, once a key trade route, is now a scenic spot for visitors and locals. The town is still known for its Catholic traditions, marimba music, and historical importance in Belize's western region.

== Historical background ==
Benque was first settled by Maya from Flores, El Petén, Guatemala. It grew as a lumber camp on the Mopan River that flowed into the Belize River, to the coast at Belize Town. The Mayas had been catechized by Spanish Catholic missionaries, leading to the predominance of the Catholic church in Benque, which holds the earliest Baptismal records in Cayo District from Jesuit Fr. Bavastro in May 1865. In 1877 the town was served by Manuel Ignacio Santa Cruz Loidi, a Basque priest and military leader in the unsuccessful effort to defeat the liberals in Spain's Third Carlist War. During the 1880s Fr. Jose Maria Pinelo, a refugee from Petén during the presidency of Manuel Barillas, visited Benque, remaining from 1887 to 1889. In the 1890s the population was about 500. In 1904 a permanent Catholic residency was established by Jesuit Fr. William "Buck" Stanton.

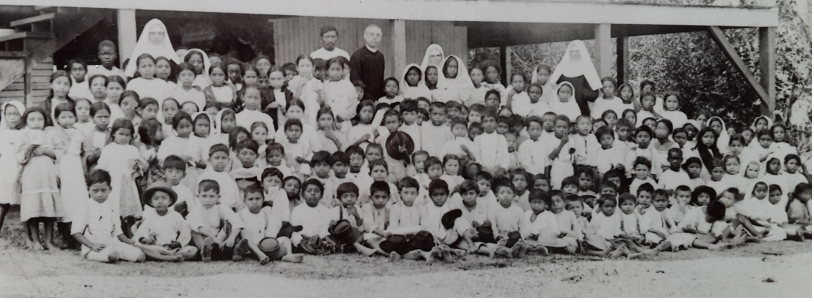
Benque Communion class with Pallottines & Fr. Versavel, c. 1920

Then in 1913, at the persuasion of Jesuit Fr. Versavel, the Pallottine sisters came from Germany and served first in Benque. Mother (Saint) Katharine Drexel subsidized their convent from her inheritance. On the night of 16 November 1937 a fire destroyed the Church of Our Lady of Mt. Carmel and Fr. Kuenzel undertook to build the new church. In 1950, Kuenzel persuaded the Town Board to name the new football field after Corporal Marchalleck through whose "self-sacrificing interest and persevering efforts [the] football campus came as if by magic out of what was hitherto useless tropical bush". St. Joseph Convent on the street of that name was completed in 1952. On 18 January 1961 Fr. Sontag, Jesuit pastor in Benque, was found murdered at his desk in the rectory, with a machete the likely weapon. The perpetrator and motive remain a mystery. In 1963 a Catholic primary school building of reinforced concrete was built. The next year the Jesuits handed the parish over to the diocesan clergy, with Fr. Herbert Panton its first native pastor. The Catholic community SOLT increased its presence in Belize from the early 1990s, beginning in Benque. Deacon Cal Cathers of SOLT founded BRC printing in Benque to improve the quality of primary school textbooks in Belize, with his grandson Daryl Rene Calvin Cathers to implement and encourage further development for the humble town.

== Demographics ==
At the time of the 2010 census, Benque Viejo del Carmen had a population of 6,148. Of these, 93.4% were Mestizo, 2.4% Mixed, 1.5% Creole, 0.7% Asian, 0.5% Garifuna, 0.4% Mennonite, 0.3% Caucasian, 0.3% Mopan Maya, 0.2% Yucatec Maya, 0.1% Ketchi Maya and 0.1% African.

During the first years of the 21st century Benque experienced a rapid boom in population. In 2010 its population, mostly of Maya or Mestizo descent, was 5,824 (2,906 males and 2,918 females); households numbered 1,415 with average size 4.1.

In terms of languages spoken (multiple answers allowed), 97.0% spoke Spanish, 69.9% English, 7.4% Creole, 0.6% Mandarin or Cantonese, 0.5% Garifuna, 0.3% Yucatec Maya, 0.2% Ketchi Maya, 0.2% Mopan Maya, 0.1% German and 0.3% other languages; 0.1% could not speak.

Benque has long been the place where tourists and merchants cross to Melchor and purchase Maya textiles. Now Guatemalan youth cross the border each day to receive a secondary education in English. Benque offers primary and secondary education, supermarkets, an annual fiesta, and is home to a Belize Premier Football League team.

The ancient Maya ruins of Xunantunich are nearby. Film director Caleb Botton used the town as the backdrop for 7 Days in Carmel which featured Benque's Holy Week processions.

As of May 2015, the mayor is Heraldo "Rancha" Ramcharan Jr. of the United Democratic Party, which also controls the town council.
