= Orange Walk People's Stadium =

Multi-purpose stadium in Belize

Coordinates: 18°04′59″N 88°34′13″W

- Interactive map of Orange Walk People's Stadium
- Location: Orange Walk, Belize
- Capacity: 4,500
- Current use: football matches

Orange Walk People's Stadium is a multi-purpose stadium in Orange Walk, Belize. It is primarily used for football matches and was the home stadium for Juventus in the Belize Premier Football League of the Football Federation of Belize before they moved to Louisiana Football Field. It has also hosted horse racing events. Prior to 2011, it served as the home stadium for San Felipe Barcelona, also in the BPFL.

The stadium holds 4,500 people.

In 2022, the stadium began hosting games for Progresso FC.
