= Marshalleck Stadium =

Football stadium in Benque Viejo, Belize

Coordinates: 17.072602°N 89.138239°W

The Marshalleck Stadium is a football stadium which is located in Benque Viejo Town, Belize. The name derives from Corporal Marshalleck who was largely responsible for clearing the tropical bush to create the stadium in 1950.

It is the home stadium of the Belize Premier Football League (BPFL) team, Hankook Verdes United.

It has a capacity of 2,000 people.
