= San Felipe, Orange Walk =

San Felipe
- Location within Belize
- Coordinates: 17.8667°N 88.7667°W
- Country: Belize
- District: Orange Walk District
- Constituency: Orange Walk South

Population (2010)
  - Total: 1,499
- Time zone: UTC-6 (Central)
- Climate: Am

San Felipe is a village in Orange Walk District, Belize. According to the 2010 census, San Felipe has a population of 1,499 people in 332 households. The village is home to the Premier League of Belize football team San Felipe Barcelona who play at San Felipe Football Field.
