= Juventus F.C. (Belize) =

Belizean football club

Juventus FC
- Full name: Juventus Football Club
- Nickname: Suga Boys
- Founded: 1978
- Ground: Orange Walk People's Stadium; Orange Walk, Belize
- Capacity: 3,000
- League: Premier League of Belize
Home colours	Away colours

Juventus F.C. (not to be confused with Juventus FC from Serie A) was a Belizean football team, based in Orange Walk, which currently competes in the Belize Premier Football League (BPFL) of the Football Federation of Belize. Their home stadium is Orange Walk People's Stadium.

== Achievements ==
The "Suga Boys" were one of the greatest football teams in Belize. They have won 5 league trophies. They were the only team to win continental CONCACAF matches for Belize. Their last continental victory was 4–1 over Olimpia.

- Belize Premier League: 5
  1995–96, 1996–97, 1997–98, 1998–99, 2005

== Performance in CONCACAF competitions ==
- CONCACAF Cup Winners Cup 2 appearances

1996 – Qualifying stage (Central Zone)
1996 – Qualifying stage (Central Zone)

== Current squad ==
Note: Flags indicate national team as defined under FIFA eligibility rules; some limited exceptions apply. Players may hold more than one non-FIFA nationality.

No.	Pos.	Nation	Player
1	GK	BLZ	Howard West
2	DF	BLZ	Rudolpho Perez
3	MF	BLZ	Josamir Grahales
4	MF	BLZ	Dean Flowers
5	DF	BLZ	Roduel Dominguez
6	MF	BLZ	Edwin Gillett
7	MF	BLZ	Erwin Pott
8	FW	BLZ	Brian Chan
9	FW	BLZ	Oliver Hendricks
10	FW	BLZ	Osmar Duran
11	MF	BLZ	Orvin Wade
12	DF	BLZ	Aaron Allen
13	MF	BLZ	Steven Audinett

No.	Pos.	Nation	Player
14	FW	BLZ	Ernell Pott
15	DF	BLZ	Andrew Allen
16	FW	BLZ	Michael Whittaker
17	DF	BLZ	Enrique Castillo
18	GK	BLZ	Colville Richards
19	DF	BLZ	Isaac Gillett
20	MF	BLZ	Freddy Tun
21	DF	BLZ	Dennis Peralta
22	MF	BLZ	Adair Duran
23	FW	BLZ	Clifton West
25	MF	BLZ	Ritchel Dominguez
40	GK	BLZ	Jeffery Waight

== Former players ==
- (Iraq) Mohammed Yousif Rahim
