= San Ignacio United FC =

Belizean football club

San Ignacio United
- Full name: San Ignacio United FC
- Nickname(s): Medina's
- Founded: 2011
- Ground: Norman Broaster Stadium
- Capacity: 2,000
- Manager: Primitivo Medina
- Coach: Johnny Medina
- League: Premier League of Belize
Home colours

San Ignacio United. is a Belizean football club. It was founded and is owned by: Primitivo Medina, Johnny Medina and Mark Medina in August 2011 and competed in the Belize first division under the Cayo Football Association. The Club currently has 25 registered members consisting of players and the managing Staff, the players are a mixture of professional players from the Belize national selection and talented upcoming youths. The club is currently registered to play in the PLB(Premier League of Belize). The Premier League of Belize is the countries newest, biggest and only major league Football in Belize, and is played in a national level under The Belize Sport Council, Football Federation of Belize. and FIFA.

The team is based in San Ignacio. Their home stadium is Norman Broaster Stadium.

== Current squad ==
Note: Flags indicate national team as defined under FIFA eligibility rules; some limited exceptions apply. Players may hold more than one non-FIFA nationality.

No.	Pos.	Nation	Player
1	GK	(Belize) BLZ	Ryan Saravia
3	MF	(Belize) BLZ	Everal Gabourel (captain)
4	DF	(Belize) BLZ	Nigel Carbajal
5	MF	(Belize) BLZ	Anthony Gonzalez
6	MF	(Belize) BLZ	Larry Simon
7	FW	(Belize) BLZ	Windell Trapp
8	MF	(Belize) BLZ	Garrett Bermudez
9	FW	(Belize) BLZ	Jason Trapp
10	FW	(Peru) PER	Carlos Vasquez
11	MF	(Belize) BLZ	Roy Cano

No.	Pos.	Nation	Player
12		(Belize) BLZ	Rudolph Moody
13	FW	(Belize) BLZ	Joel Guzman
14	MF	(Belize) BLZ	Eric Guzman
15	DF	(Belize) BLZ	Reggis Morris
15		(Belize) BLZ	Liston Augustine
18	DF	(Belize) BLZ	Felix Miranda
19		(Belize) BLZ	Byrone Jones
22		(Belize) BLZ	Tevin Gamboa
—	MF	(Belize) BLZ	Victor Morales
