= San Felipe Barcelona FC =

Belizean football club

San Felipe Barcelona
- Full name: San Felipe Barcelona Football Club
- Nickname: Palmeros
- Founded: 2006
- Ground: San Felipe Football Field; San Felipe, Belize
- League: Premier League of Belize
Home colours	Away colours

San Felipe Barcelona is a Belizean football team, currently playing in the Premier League of Belize.

The team is based in San Felipe, Orange Walk District. Their home stadium is San Felipe Football Field.

== History ==
The team was founded in 2006 as Alpha Glitters Football Club, was renamed Alpha Barcelona in the summer of 2007 and changed its name before the 2008/2009 season to its current name.

== Current squad ==
Note: Flags indicate national team as defined under FIFA eligibility rules; some limited exceptions apply. Players may hold more than one non-FIFA nationality.

No.	Pos.	Nation	Player
1	GK	BLZ	Luis Cocom
2	MF	BLZ	Randy Cassanova
3	DF	BLZ	Joel Padron
4	FW	BLZ	Josue Acebedo
5	MF	BLZ	Jacobo Cawich
6	MF	BLZ	Eduardo Morales (captain)
7	MF	BLZ	Irvin Magana
8	MF	BLZ	Harvey Cruz
9	FW	BLZ	Oscar Acevedo
10	DF	BLZ	Camilo Cruz
11	FW	BLZ	Christopher Hendricks
12	GK	BLZ	Bryan Hernandez
13	DF	BLZ	Noly Magana
14	MF	BLZ	Noel Velasquez

No.	Pos.	Nation	Player
15	DF	BLZ	Luis Acevedo
16	DF	BLZ	Geraldo Padron
18	DF	BLZ	Elsten Allen
19	MF	BLZ	Jaziz Wicab
20	MF	BLZ	Deris Benavides
22	FW	BLZ	Eliazar Itza
24	MF	BLZ	Eliceo Garcia
25	DF	BLZ	Roamir Kenny Canul
27	DF	BLZ	Cesario Rosales
28	DF	BLZ	David Rosales
30	GK	BLZ	Darell Novelo
35	FW	BLZ	Adonis Novelo
39	MF	BLZ	Abner Santos
70	DF	BLZ	Gabriel Perez
