= FC Belize =

Belizean football club

F.C. Belize
- Full name: Football Club Belize
- Nickname: FC
- Founded: 2005
- Dissolved: 2015
- Ground: MCC Grounds; Belize City, Belize
- Capacity: 5,000
- Manager: Dean Flowers / Ken Vasquez
- League: Premier League of Belize
- 2013–14: 6th
Home colours	Away colours

FC Belize was a Belizean football team which competed in the Premier League of Belize (PLB) of the Football Federation of Belize. They were based in Belize City and last competed in 2015 before financial issues and the death of owner Lionel Welch forced them to withdraw. Their home stadium, the MCC Grounds, was closed in June 2014 by the Belize National Sports Council and FC Belize was relocated to Louisiana Football Field in Orange Walk Town.

== Achievements ==
- Belize Premier Football League: 2

2006, 2007

== 2014–15 squad ==
Note: Flags indicate national team as defined under FIFA eligibility rules; some limited exceptions apply. Players may hold more than one non-FIFA nationality.

No.	Pos.	Nation	Player
1	GK	BLZ	Rodrigo Vasques
3	DF	HON	Andrew Estell
4	DF	HON	Jorge Alliman
8	DF	BLZ	Hector Martinez
9	FW	BLZ	Harlan Cassanova
10	MF	BLZ	Russel Cassanova
11	MF	BLZ	Avian Crawford
12	DF	BLZ	Jordy Lopez
15	DF	BLZ	Shannon Flowers
15	DF	BLZ	Mark Grant
16	FW	BLZ	Devaun Zuniga

No.	Pos.	Nation	Player
17	FW	BLZ	Travis Eiley
20	MF	BLZ	Kevin Lino
21	MF	BLZ	Denzel Co
22	FW	BLZ	Leon Jones
25	FW	BLZ	Stephen Baizer
27	FW	BLZ	Kadeem Myers
29	MF	BLZ	Mark Leslie
31	MF	BLZ	Dmitri Fabro
56	GK	BLZ	Marcus Lewis
71	MF	BLZ	Jason Young

== Managers ==
- (Belize) Marvin Ottley (2005–2007)
- (Belize) Eian Henry (2007–2013)
- (Honduras) Jorge Nunez (2014–2015)
