= Belize Defence Force FC =

Belizean football club

- Full name: Belize Defence Force Football Club
- Nickname(s): BDF
- Founded: 2007
- Ground: MCC Grounds; Belize City, Belize
- Capacity: 5,000
- Manager: unknown
- League: unknown
Home colours	Away colours

Belize Defence Force Football Club is a Belizean football team based in Belize City which currently competes in the Premier League of Belize of the Football Federation of Belize. It is sponsored by the country's national army of the same name. The Belize Defence Force F.C (or "Military Football Machine" as they are known at the national level) have won the Belize Premier Football League National Championship three times; the 2009–2010 Opening season, the 2009–10 Closing season, and the 2010–11 Opening season.

The team is based in Belize. Their home stadium is MCC Grounds.

== Current squad ==
Note: Flags indicate national team as defined under FIFA eligibility rules; some limited exceptions apply. Players may hold more than one non-FIFA nationality.

No.	Pos.	Nation	Player
2	DF	(Belize) BLZ	Victor Nunez (captain)
3	DF	(Belize) BLZ	Vallan Symms
5	DF	(Belize) BLZ	Phillip Lewis
6	MF	(Belize) BLZ	Stephen Martinez
7	MF	(Belize) BLZ	Ean Lewis
8	MF	(Belize) BLZ	John King
9	FW	(Belize) BLZ	Harrison Tasher
10	FW	(Belize) BLZ	Shane Flores
11	DF	(Belize) BLZ	Khalil Velasquez
12	MF	(Belize) BLZ	Leron Thomas

No.	Pos.	Nation	Player
13	DF	(Belize) BLZ	Edward Lawrence
15	DF	(Belize) BLZ	Ricky Ricketts
16	MF	(Belize) BLZ	Abraham Chavez
17	FW	(Belize) BLZ	Desmond Wade
20	FW	(Belize) BLZ	Leonard Valdez
21	MF	(Belize) BLZ	Paul Nunez
22	DF	(Honduras) HON	Tarrel Flores
25	MF	(Belize) BLZ	Ambrose Thomas
30	GK	(Belize) BLZ	Zacary Chedin
32	GK	(El Salvador) SLV	Nicolas Bello

== List of Coaches ==
- (Guatemala) José Salas (2009–2010)
- (Belize) Gregory Cantun (2010–2015)
- (Belize) Jerome Serrano (2016)

== List of Club Presidents ==
- (Belize) Ret. Col Javier Castellanos (2009–2011)
- (Belize) Ret. Maj Lionel Cutkelvin (2010–2012)
- (Belize) Maj Elryn Reyes (2013)
- (Belize) Capt Victor Brecenio (2014)
- (Belize) Capt Rogelio Pop (2015)
- (Belize) Capt Kenrick Lincoln Martinez Sr. (2016)
