= FFB Stadium =

Stadium in Belmopan City, Belize

FFB Field
- FFB Field
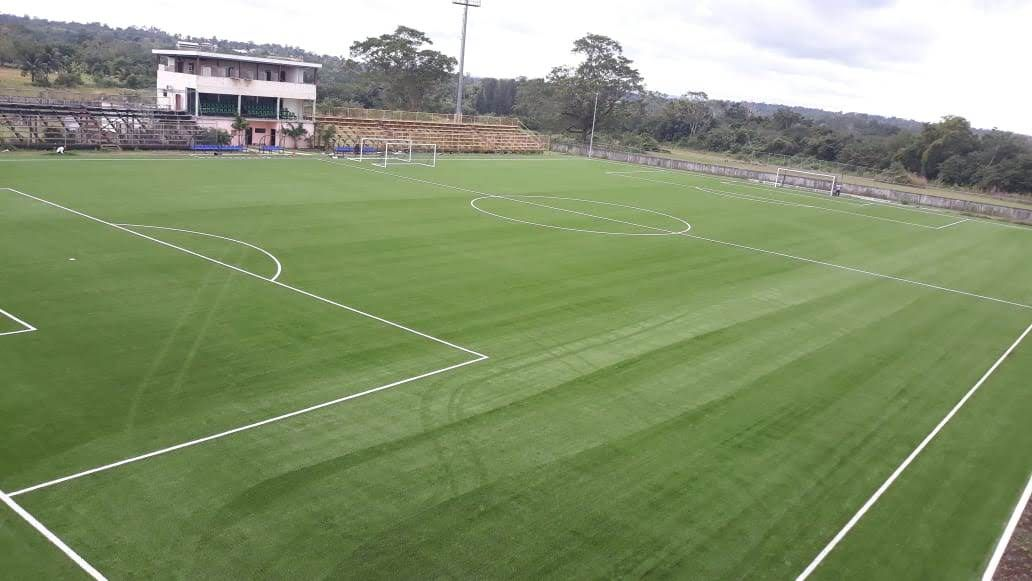
- Interactive map of FFB Field
- Location: Belmopan, Belize
- Coordinates: 17°15′8″N 88°47′11″W
- Capacity: 5,000
- Surface: Synthetic Turf

Construction
- Opened: 2014; 12 years ago

Tenants
- Belize national football team (2011–present); Police United

FFB Stadium is a football stadium in Belmopan, Belize. It has a capacity of 5,000 spectators. It is the home stadium for the Belize national football team, and is also used by the Premier League of Belize team Police United.

Between April and July 2014, FFB stadium received an upgrade to meet CONCACAF standards to hold international and club games. These upgrades which included installation of 1100 – 1600 lux stadium lights, a FIFA certified field with certified bleachers and sanitary facilities with team lockers, as well as a complete enhancement of existing buildings. These upgrades were possible thanks to two million dollar donation by FIFA. However, in August 2014, CONCACAF ruled that the stadium did not meet standards to host matches in the 2014–15 CONCACAF Champions League.
