= San Pedro Seadogs FC =

Belizean football club

San Pedro Sea Dogs
- Full name: San Pedro Seadogs Football Club
- Founded: 1997
- Ground: Ambergris Stadium; San Pedro, Belize
- Capacity: 3,500
- Manager: Hugo Pineda
- League: Premier League of Belize
Home colours

San Pedro Seadogs is a Belizean football team which currently competes in the Premier League of Belize of the Football Federation of Belize.

The team is based in San Pedro. They play their home games at the Ambergris Stadium.

== Current squad ==
Note: Flags indicate national team as defined under FIFA eligibility rules; some limited exceptions apply. Players may hold more than one non-FIFA nationality.

No.	Pos.	Nation	Player
2	DF	(Belize) BLZ	Thomas Baptist
3	DF	(Belize) BLZ	Jerome Gillett
4	DF	(Belize) BLZ	Michael Rowland
5	DF	(Belize) BLZ	Alex Garcia
6	MF	(Belize) BLZ	Melvin Almendariz
7	FW	(Belize) BLZ	Demor Valladarez
8	DF	(Belize) BLZ	Jacinto Pinelo
9	MF	(Belize) BLZ	Ethnie Figueroa
10	FW	(Belize) BLZ	Kenny Witzel
11	FW	(Belize) BLZ	Angel Cantun
12	DF	(Guatemala) GUA	Yorvani Chavez
13	DF	(Belize) BLZ	Kent Gabourel (captain)
14	MF	(Honduras) HON	Francisco Mejia

No.	Pos.	Nation	Player
15	FW	(Belize) BLZ	Mario Chimal
16	MF	(Belize) BLZ	Kaedell Middleton
17	FW	(Belize) BLZ	Jesse Smith
18	MF	(Peru) PER	Jesus Lozano
19	MF	(Belize) BLZ	Giovanni Reyes
20	FW	(Belize) BLZ	Tyrone Young
21	DF	(Belize) BLZ	Andy Albeno
22	GK	(Belize) BLZ	Rugerri Trejo
23	MF	(Belize) BLZ	Isani Guzman
24	MF	(Belize) BLZ	Daniel Caliz
26	DF	(Belize) BLZ	Cleon Henry
36	GK	(Belize) BLZ	Alden Augustine
