= MCC Grounds (stadium) =

Stadium in Belize City, Belize

The Marylebone Cricket Club Grounds
- MCC Grounds
- Interactive map of The Marylebone Cricket Club Grounds
- Full name: The Marylebone Cricket Club Grounds
- Location: Belize City, Belize
- Coordinates: 17°30′16″N 88°11′21″W
- Capacity: 2,000
- Surface: Grass

Construction
- Opened: 1950; 76 years ago

Tenant
- Belize Defence Force FC (present)

The Marylebone Cricket Club Grounds (MCC Grounds for short) is a Belizean football stadium, located on the Northside of Belize City, Belize.

== Football ==
It has traditionally been the homefield of all Belize City clubs that participate in national and international competitions. It is currently being occupied by FC Belize of the Premier League of Belize (PLB).

It also plays host to primary school and high school football competitions.

== History ==
The Grounds opened in the 1950s on the site known as the Barracks and was named after an English cricket team (Belize was a British colony). The MCC has since played host to numerous matches between City teams and visitors in the Belize Premier Football League, now the Premier League of Belize, and competitions sponsored by UNCAF and CONCACAF.

The MCC Grounds is a multi-purpose stadium located in Belize City, Belize. Originally established for cricket by the Marylebone Cricket Club, the venue transitioned into the primary football stadium for the city during the 20th century. It currently serves as the home field for the Belize Defense Force FC and has previously hosted matches for FC Belize and the Belize national football team.

The stadium is noted for its proximity to the Caribbean Sea, which often subjects the playing surface to salt-air erosion and drainage challenges. In 2021, the Belize City Council and the National Sports Council initiated a series of infrastructure upgrades, including improvements to the perimeter fencing, locker rooms, and the pitch surface to meet the standards required for the Premier League of Belize.
