= Orange Walk Town =

- Town
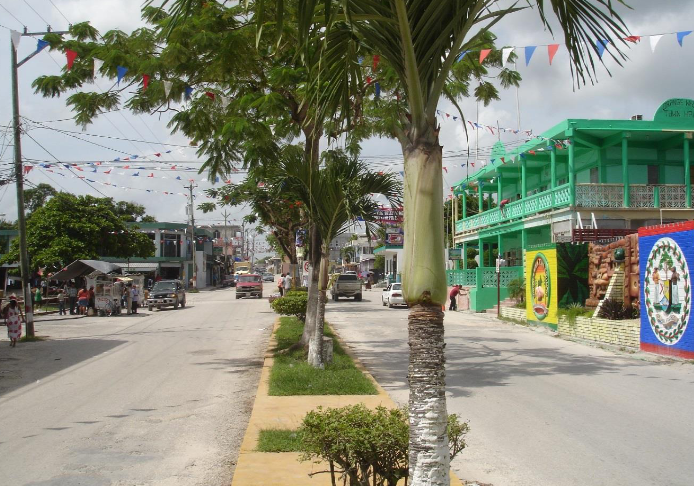
- Orange Walk Town
- Nickname: Sugar City
- Location within Belize
- Coordinates: 18°04′30″N 88°33′30″W
- Country: Belize
- District: Orange Walk
- Municipality: Orange Walk Town

Government
  - Mayor: Ladrick Shepherd (PUP)

Area
  - Urban: 18.9 km^{2} (7.28 sq mi)
  - Metro: 15 km^{2} (5.8 sq mi)
- Elevation: 33 m (108 ft)

Population (2010)
  - Town: 13,708
  - Estimate (2016): 13,683
  - Rank: 3rd
  - Urban: 13,750
  - Metro: 25,767
- Demonym: Orange Walkeño(a)
- Time zone: UTC-6 (Central)
- Climate: Aw
- Website: Official website

Orange Walk is the fourth largest town in Belize, with a population of about 13,400 (Official Release of the Main Findings of the 2010 Population and Housing Census). It is the capital of the Orange Walk District. Orange Walk Town is located on the west bank of the New River, 53 miles (85 km) north of Belize City and 30 miles (48 km) south of Corozal Town. Despite the English name of the city, its residents are primarily Spanish-speaking mestizos.

== History ==
In the days of the Maya civilization, the area was known as Holpatin. The district is home to the largest Maya temple of the pre-classic period. The Maya of the area came in contact with the Europeans in the 1530s, after which the two groups fought over land. In 1848, there was a massive influx of Maya and Mestizos from Mexico, fleeing the Caste War of Yucatán (1847–1901). This caused a rapid growth of population. In 1872, it was the site of the Battle of Orange Walk. Lamanai (meaning "submerged crocodile" in Mayan dialect) and Cuello ("neck" in Spanish) are two very early Mayan ruins located in Orange Walk. Cuello is in fact the oldest Mayan settlement in Belize, dating back to around 2000 BC.

In the nineteenth century, Orange Walk was a small township located mostly on the western banks of the New River, consisting mainly of thatched and wooden dwellings. The town had grown from a stop on the New River by logwood, mahogany and chicle workers who used the New River as a transport system and stopped on their way to the sea with their products at the logging camp known as Orange Walk. With time the settlement continued growing, especially after the Caste War in neighbouring Mexico brought many migrants escaping the war and who settled in town or in villages around the town. In 1963 a sugar mill was started that brought another influx of migrant workers from other districts and surrounding countries, looking for work and land. Population in Orange Walk Town grew as a result.

== Economy ==
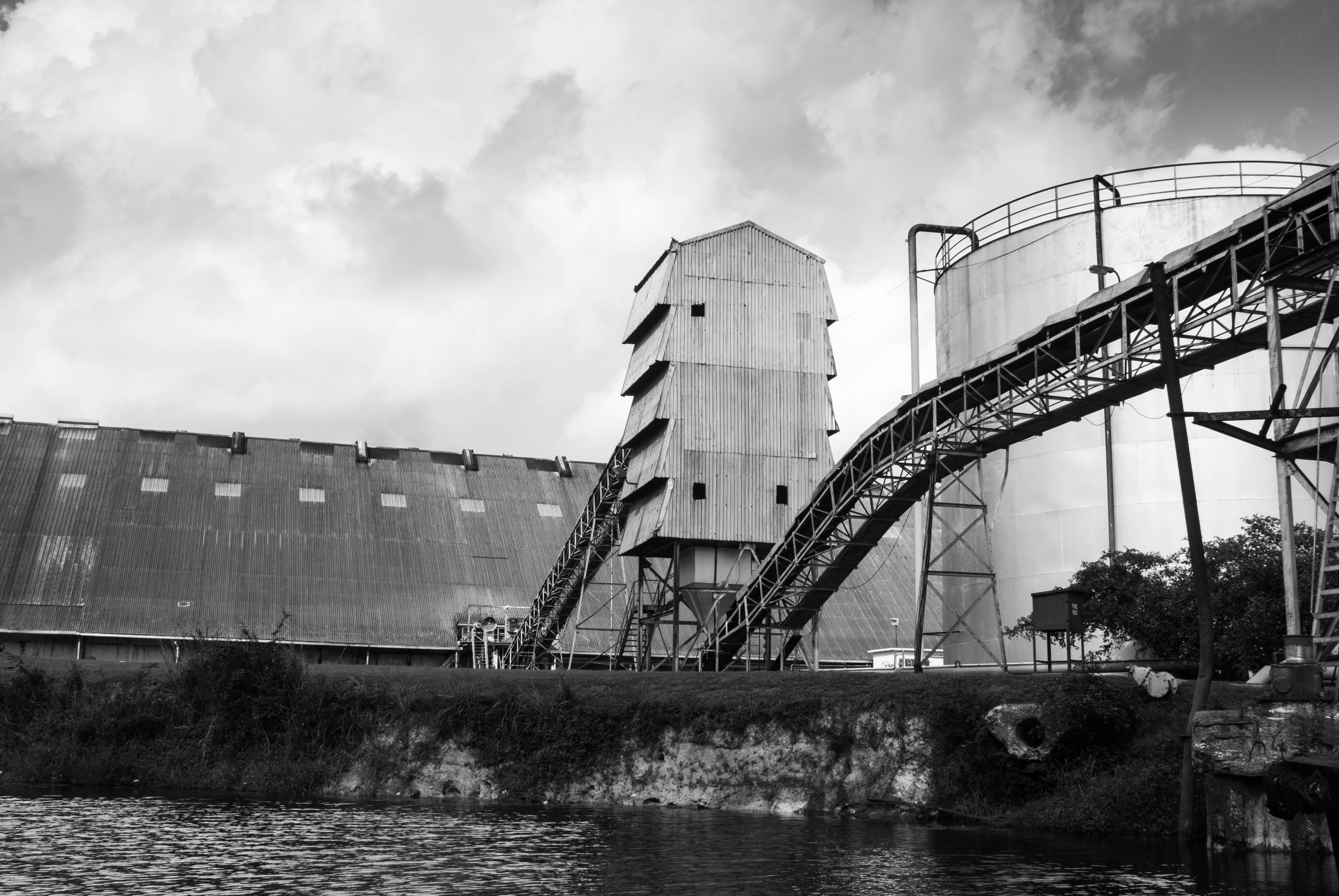
Orange Walk Town Sugar Cane Processing Plant

With the Maya and Mestizos came their many traditions that today abound in the region. One such thing that they brought was sugar cane, which in the years to come became the basis of one of Belize's leading industries. Today, this industry continues to thrive in the region, and Orange Walk Town is nicknamed "Sugar City". The local Tower Hill Sugar Factory (Belize Sugar Industries) handles all of the country's sugar cane output. Rum is also made from the local cane by refineries such as Cuello Refinery Ltd, Caribbean Refinery and Old Master Rum. It is then mostly consumed nationally and not customarily exported. The farming of other crops, and tourism, also play a role in the economy. Overall, Orange Walk has one of Belize's strongest and most productive economies. The poverty rate in Orange Walk is 24.9%, the second-lowest in the country. The quality of life is also comparatively high due to the strong economy. The median income adjusted for Purchasing Power Parity (PPP) is about US$12,000.

Tourism in Orange Walk is mostly ecotourism.

== Government and governmental services ==
=== Orange Walk government ===
Orange Walk Town is in the Orange Walk District, and has a People's United Party (PUP) town council. The PUP is a left-center party and one of the two major parties in the country.

=== Governmental and public services ===
==== General ====
Healthcare - the Northern Regional Hospital is the public hospital of the Orange Walk area. It has a total of 57 beds and has 11 outlying health centers and 16 outlying health posts. There are also several private clinics that offer mostly primary and secondary health care.

Education - There are seven primary schools, four high schools and a junior college in Orange Walk Town.

The National Fire Service has a branch in Orange Walk.

Orange Walk is home to seven financial institutions, including Atlantic Bank, Belize Bank, and Heritage Bank.

==== Internet ====
Belize Telemedia Limited and Smart, the two largest telephony and internet service providers in Belize, have offices in Orange Walk. So does Centaur Cable Network, a cable television and internet provider unique to Orange Walk.

==== Radio stations ====
- Kairos Belize Radio 89.7
- Sugar City Radio Station (Orange Walk) (103.1 FM) SCRS.bz
  - Home station of the UDP in Orange Walk.
- Fiesta FM (Orange Walk) (106.7 FM)
  - See Centaur Cable Network.
- Power FM 95.5
- East Radio 104.9 FM
- KREM Radio 91.1
- Estereo Amor 95.9
- Love FM Orange Walk Repeater 98.1
- More FM 107.1
- Estereo Tu y Yo 98.5
- Universal Radio

== Climate ==
Climate data for Orange Walk Town (BSI Tower Hill) 1991–2020
| Month | Jan | Feb | Mar | Apr | May | Jun | Jul | Aug | Sep | Oct | Nov | Dec | Year |
|---|---|---|---|---|---|---|---|---|---|---|---|---|---|
| Mean daily maximum °C (°F) | 29.5 (85.1) | 30.6 (87.1) | 31.9 (89.4) | 33.5 (92.3) | 33.9 (93.0) | 33.4 (92.1) | 32.9 (91.2) | 33.5 (92.3) | 33.5 (92.3) | 32.2 (90.0) | 30.6 (87.1) | 29.8 (85.6) | 32.1 (89.8) |
| Daily mean °C (°F) | 23.6 (74.5) | 24.4 (75.9) | 25.4 (77.7) | 27.1 (80.8) | 28.2 (82.8) | 28.6 (83.5) | 28.0 (82.4) | 28.4 (83.1) | 28.4 (83.1) | 27.2 (81.0) | 25.4 (77.7) | 24.2 (75.6) | 26.6 (79.9) |
| Mean daily minimum °C (°F) | 17.8 (64.0) | 18.1 (64.6) | 18.8 (65.8) | 20.8 (69.4) | 22.4 (72.3) | 23.7 (74.7) | 23.1 (73.6) | 23.2 (73.8) | 23.3 (73.9) | 22.1 (71.8) | 20.2 (68.4) | 18.7 (65.7) | 21.0 (69.8) |
| Average rainfall mm (inches) | 65.1 (2.56) | 34.6 (1.36) | 25.0 (0.98) | 40.9 (1.61) | 123.3 (4.85) | 197.3 (7.77) | 141.9 (5.59) | 184.8 (7.28) | 176.4 (6.94) | 205.2 (8.08) | 124.0 (4.88) | 75.2 (2.96) | 1,393.7 (54.86) |
| Average rainy days (≥ 1.0 mm) | 8 | 4 | 3 | 3 | 6 | 12 | 12 | 12 | 13 | 13 | 10 | 9 | 105 |
Source: National Meteorological Service of Belize

The climate in Orange Walk is generally dry and relatively warm compared with other regions. Rainstorms are usually brief when they do occur.

== Ethnic and Racial Demographics ==
The region is highly populated by Mestizo, Yucatec Maya, Kriols, Mennonites, Chinese, Taiwanese, Indians, and other people from Central America. Approximately 78% of the population identifies as Indigenous Latino (Indigenous), 11.1% identify as Mennonite, Maya make up 1.7% of the populace, Garifuna 0.8%, East Indian 0.7%, Creole 7.2%, White 0.3%, and Asian 0.8%. As a whole, Orange Walk is the least ethnically diverse city in Belize, with a mainly Hispanic population.

== Religion ==
Religion is important to most in Orange Walk, to some more than others. There is a large Catholic presence, although many Evangelicals can also be found preaching in the streets and proselytizing. There are many churches and ministries in Orange Walk. About 65% of Orange Walk residents are Roman Catholic, Protestants make up 22%, Jehovah's Witnesses 2%, and Hindu, Buddhist, Islam, Mormons, and Salvation Army make up about 1% each.

There are about fifty registered churches in the Orange Walk region. The following are some of the ministries and churches located in the greater Orange Walk area:

- Iglesia de Dios Pentecostes "Lirio de los Valles"
- Harvest Bible Chapel
- Orange Walk Church of the Nazarene
- Lighthouse Mennonite Church
- Immaculate Conception Catholic Church
- Betel Evangelical Church
- Iglesia Cristiana Josue AD
- Full Gospel Church of God (IDEC)
- La Inmaculada Roman Catholic Church
- Koinonia Ministries
- Jesus Deaf Church
- Hall of Jehovah's Witnesses OW
- Awakening Ministries
- St Michael Catholic Church
- Alfa y Omega Church
- Maranatha Seventh Day Adventist Church
- Carmelita Baptist Chapel
- Mision Internacional Vida Abundante
- Temple Missionary Baptist Church
- United in Christ Evangelical Church
- Shalom Mennonite Church
- World Wide Missionary Movement Church
- Rio Hondo Mennonite Church

== Language ==
The most used language in Orange Walk Town is English, but Spanish is also very common and almost everyone speaks it to some extent. The official statistics as of 2010 report that 0.7% speak Chinese, 16.8% speak Kriol, 62.2% speak English, 0.5% speak Garifuna, 10% speak German (Low German or "Plattdeutsch"), 2.3% speak Maya/Indigenous tongues, 85.6% speak Spanish, and 0.6% speak other languages.

== Population and housing ==
2010 Population and Housing Census lists Orange Walk Town's total population as 13,400 residents. Of this 6,642 are males and 6,758 are females. The total number of households is 3,361 and the average household size is 4.4. 88.1% of these Orange Walk residents live in a full private house, 5.9% in part of a private house, 1.3% in an apartment, and 4.5% in other. About 14% of Orange Walkeños rent a dwelling, whereas about 59.4% own houses mortgage free. Most of the buildings in the city were built from 1990 to 1999. Of these, over half are made of cement blocks, and a quarter of wood. About three-fourths of all roofs are made of sheet metal. Homes and buildings in Orange Walk are the best kept, with the lowest rate of necessary repair in the country.

According to some official town council sources, Orange Walk is becoming more congested and densely populated, and is moving toward apartment flats as an alternative to traditional houses. However, up to 1,200 plots of land are abandoned or have dilapidated, derelict housing.

== Education ==
The quality of education in Orange Walk is among the highest in Belize. Students from Orange Walk frequently score well on standardized examinations within and without the country.

The literacy rate of Orange Walk is 72.6%, which is the second-lowest rate in the country after Punta Gorda. .

The school attendance figure is about 55% of males and 45% of females for primary school, 50%-50% for high schools, and 40% of males versus 60% of females attend college.

In Orange Walk about a quarter of all students surpass 70% on their standardized exams, compared with only 15% doing so in Stann Creek District. Orange Walk has the highest rate of trained teachers in the country, second only to Corozal.

Despite the high quality of education, Orange Walk has the second-highest rate of children aged 5–13 outside of school in the country, at 24.1%.

Orange Walk has one of the lowest student budgets in the country, less than half that of Belize City. Most Orange Walk residents pay for education out of their own pockets, spending 12% of their total budgets on it. This is almost double the 7.4% that Toledo residents spend on education.

=== Primary schools ===
Primary schools include:

- Louisiana Government School
- Chapel School
- New Life Presbyterian Primary School
- Solomon's SDA School
- La Inmaculada Primary School
- St Peter's Anglican School
- Carmelita Government School

=== High schools ===
High schools in the Orange Walk metropolitan area include:

- Orange Walk Technical High School
- New Hope High School
- Bishop Martin High School
- Muffles High School
- San Juan Bautista High School

=== Tertiary schools and colleges ===
The following are the tertiary institutions/universities located in Orange Walk:

- Orange Walk ITVET
- Muffles College
- University of Belize Orange Walk Campus
- Galen University

== Parks and public spaces ==
Orange Walk has many parks, public spaces, and green areas. There are large, ancient, sprawling trees scattered throughout the city.

=== Parks ===
The Town Council in Orange Walk has done well in creating many parks in the area. They are mostly clean and family-friendly. They include:

- Queen Elizabeth Park and Market Area
- Union Town Park
- Louisiana Nature Park
- San Lorenzo Site Park
- Trial Farm Park
- Orange Walk Central Park
- Independence Park

=== Public spaces ===
- Multipurpose Complex
- East Sports Center
- People's Stadium
- Trial Farm Basketball and Sports Area

=== Monuments and historical sites ===
- Marcos Canul Monument adjacent to the Town Barracks
- La Inmaculada Church and Monolith
- Unnamed Soldier World War 2 Statue in Independence Park
- Trenches constructed to protect the colonial settlement in 1876
- Fort Mundy
- Colonial Anglican Church and many other British-style colonial edifices
- Ancient standard colonial water tower downtown represents centuries of British influence
- The police station sits atop a buried Mayan Pyramid - it was known as Dzuluinicob, or “land of foreigners." in the Pre-Columbian era.
- Statue of Yucatec Maya woman breastfeeding in Queen Victoria Park

== Transportation ==
The locality is served by the Orange Walk Airport (IATA: ORZ). Local bus service to and from Belize City to the south and Corozal Town to the north operates approximately every half-hour. Taxis and minibuses are also available for transportation within the city and to surrounding villages and towns. The town is a mid-stop point between Belize City and Chetumal, Mexico, and for this reason many large tour buses pass through on a regular basis. The Orange Walk District in general, and Orange Walk Town in particular, are drug-trafficking centers due to their close proximity to Mexico.

The streets in Orange Walk town are very well paved in most areas, with almost no potholes. There are some speed bumps throughout the town, as well as traffic lights at main intersections (which are a rarity in Belize).

=== Statistics ===
In accordance with the Orange Walk Transport Authority, there are about twenty daily buses coming into Orange Walk from the surrounding areas. About fifty buses leave Orange Walk to surrounding towns, villages, and to Quintana Roo, Mexico.

== Social issues ==
Orange Walk is generally a safe city. Only about 0.5 people per 1,000 are homeless. Orange Walk has a very low internet access rate at 22.3%, compared with 38.2% in Belize City.

Orange Walk has the second-highest marriage rate in the country at 43.7% of all persons.

A relatively low number of foreign-born persons live in the city (10.8%, as opposed to 14.5% national average).

== Healthcare ==
The town is served by the Northern Regional Hospital, formerly called the Orange Walk Hospital, and a second major private hospital named Northern Medical Specialist Plaza. Orange Walk has a very good quality of healthcare. The infant mortality rate is 8.5 per 1,000 live births, and the crude death rate was 4.2 per 1,000 persons in 2010. Several clinics are available in Orange Walk, including, but not limited to:

- La Asuncion Radio-Diagnostic Center & Medical Lab on Asuncion Street
- Sonoscan Ultrasound Care on Baker's Street
- Eve's Specialty Clinic on Ketz Lagoon Street
- Davila's Ultrasound on Corozal Street
- Sugar City Medical Center
- Polaris Medical Clinic on Cinderella Street
- Genesis Medical Clinic on San Antonio Road
- Brigido's Medical and Dental Clinic
- Osorio's Family Health Clinic on Queen Victoria Street
- The Dental Clinic of Dr Silvia Rios on Otro Benque Street
- Dialisis de Belice (Belize-Corozal Road)

There are also many pharmacies:

- Alex Pharmacy (Alex Lopez) (157 Belize Corozal Rd)
- De La Fuente Pharmacy (16 Main St)
- Pharmacy Lucille (Beytias St)
- De La Fuente Pharmacy - Holy Trinity Branch (Holy Trinity St)
- Prisma's Pharmacy (San Antonio Rd)
- MediGreen Pharmacy (28 Belize-Corozal Road)
- DR's Pharmacy Ltd. (Santa Ana St.)
- Selene's Pharmacy (Progress Street)
- RAD's Pharmacy (San Antonio Road)
- DKNN's Pharmacy (Main Street)
- 123 Supermarket (Liberty Avenue)
