= Football Federation of Belize =

Governing body of association football in Belize

CONCACAF
- Short name: FFB
- Founded: 1980; 46 years ago
- Headquarters: Belmopan
- FIFA affiliation: 1986
- CONCACAF affiliation: 1986
- President: Sergio Chuc
- Website: footballfederationbelize.com

The Football Federation of Belize (FFB), formerly known as the Belize National Football Association (BNFA) and founded in 1980, is the governing body of football in Belize. It is a member of Fédération Internationale de Football Association (FIFA), CONCACAF, and Union Centroamericana de Fútbol (UNCAF).

== Founding and executive bodies ==
Founding Fathers of the FFB were Mr. Delhart Courtney J.P, Sir George Brown (retired Chief Justice of Belize), Mr. Hubert Bradley and Mr. Daniel Edmund. Courtney served as the first President and retired in 1996. Other Presidents include Mr. Rafael Cal and Mr. Nick Pollard Jr.

Marlon Kuylen was the Acting President of the FFB until 2017 when a President should have been elected at the 2017 Ordinary Congress. The FFB comprises three main bodies: Executive Committee, General Council and General Meeting.

The FFB is organized into several regional affiliates and leagues, which serve as a farm system for the Premier League of Belize.

The Premier League of Belize is the top football league in Belize. It is sanctioned by the professional division of the FFB and its teams are eligible for international competition.

On June 17, 2019, Belize national football team signed a one-year contract with Vincenzo Alberto Annese an Italian football coach.

=== Association staff ===
Name	Position	Source
(Belize) Sergio Chuc	President	
(Belize) Cruz Gamez	Vice President	
(Belize) Marlon Kuylen	2nd Vice President	
(Belize) Earl Jones	General Secretary	
n/a	Treasurer	
(Belize) Philip Marin	Technical Director	
(Uruguay) Daniel Bartolotta	Team Coach (Men's)	
(Belize) Wayne Casimiro	Team Coach (Women's)	
(Belize) John Palacio	Media/Communications Manager	
(Belize) Earl Trapp	Futsal Coordinator	
(Belize) Omario Contreras	Referee Coordinator	

=== Regional Affiliates and Football Leagues ===
- Premier League of Belize
- Corozal Football Association
- Orange Walk Football Association
- Belize District Football Association.
- Belmopan Football Association
- Cayo Football Association
- Stann Creek Football Association
- Toledo Football Association

== June 2011 suspension by FIFA ==
On 15 June 2011, Belize kicked off the Road to Brazil (2014 FIFA World Cup qualification) against Montserrat, winning 2–5 away in a match played in the Ato Boldon Stadium in Couva, Trinidad. However, the return which was scheduled for 19 June was postponed by FIFA when they suspended the FFB due to governmental interference. The FFB filed suit against Belize's Minister for Sports John Saldivar over the suspension; they were represented by Elson Kaseke.
