= 2013 Copa Centroamericana squads =

The 2013 Copa Centroamericana was the twelfth edition of the Copa Centroamericana competition. Costa Rica was the host nation. The competition began on 18 January, and concluded with the final on 27 January 2013. Every national team's squad consisted of 21 players with three goalkeepers included.

== Group A ==
=== Belize ===
Head coach: (Costa Rica) Leroy Sherrier Lewis

No.	Pos.	Player	Date of birth (age)	Caps	Goals	Club
	GK	Frank Lopez	3 March 1989 (aged 23)			(Football Federation of Belize) Belize Defence Force
	GK	Woodrow West	19 September 1985 (aged 27)	4	0	(Football Federation of Belize) Belmopan Bandits
	DF	Dalton Eiley (captain)	10 December 1983 (aged 29)	12	0	(Football Federation of Belize) Placencia Assassins
	DF	Shannon Flowers	24 July 1985 (aged 27)			(Football Federation of Belize) Police United
	DF	Ian Gaynair	26 February 1986 (aged 26)	12	0	(Football Federation of Belize) Belmopan Bandits
	DF	Cristobal Gilharry	2 September 1980 (aged 32)			(Football Federation of Belize) FC Belize
	DF	San Leobardo Mendez	21 September 1994 (aged 18)			(Football Federation of Belize) Verdes FC
	DF	Tyrone Pandy	14 January 1986 (aged 27)			(Football Federation of Belize) Belize Defence Force
	DF	Everal Trapp	22 January 1987 (aged 25)	5	0	(Football Federation of Belize) Verdes FC
	MF	Jeromy James	11 April 1981 (aged 31)			(Football Federation of Belize) Belmopan Bandits
	MF	Trevor Lennan	5 June 1983 (aged 29)	6	0	(Football Federation of Belize) Police United
	MF	Andres Makin Jr.	11 April 1992 (aged 20)			(Football Federation of Belize) Police United
	MF	Devon Makin	11 November 1990 (aged 22)			(Football Federation of Belize) Police United
	MF	Elroy Smith (captain)	30 November 1981 (aged 31)	16	2	(National Autonomous Federation of Football of Honduras) Deportes Savio
	MF	Dellon Torres	14 June 1994 (aged 18)			(Football Federation of Belize) Placencia Assassins
	FW	Russel Cassanova	4 April 1991 (aged 21)			(Football Federation of Belize) San Antonio FC
	FW	Evan Mariano	20 January 1988 (aged 24)	3	0	(Football Federation of Belize) Police United
	FW	Deon McCaulay	20 September 1987 (aged 25)	20	15	(Football Federation of Belize) R.G. City Boys United
	MF	Harrison Roches	29 November 1983 (aged 29)	15	3	(National Autonomous Federation of Football of Honduras) Marathón
	FW	Ashley Torres	15 September 1985 (aged 27)			(Football Federation of Belize) Placencia Assassins

=== Costa Rica ===
Head coach: (Colombia) Jorge Luis Pinto

No.	Pos.	Player	Date of birth (age)	Caps	Goals	Club
	GK	Patrick Pemberton	May 24, 1982 (aged 30)	5	0	(Costa Rican Football Federation) Alajuelense
	GK	Daniel Cambronero	January 8, 1986 (aged 27)	2	0	(Costa Rican Football Federation) Herediano
	GK	Jorge Jara	March 3, 1996 (aged 16)	0	0	(Costa Rican Football Federation) Saprissa
	DF	Michael Umaña	July 16, 1982 (aged 30)	50	0	(National Football Federation of Guatemala) Comunicaciones
	DF	José Salvatierra	October 10, 1989 (aged 23)	20	0	(Costa Rican Football Federation) Alajuelense
	DF	Giancarlo González	February 8, 1988 (aged 24)	14	1	(Norwegian Football Federation) Valerenga
	DF	Christopher Meneses	May 2, 1990 (aged 22)	4	0	(Costa Rican Football Federation) Alajuelense
	DF	Pablo Salazar	November 21, 1982 (aged 30)	1	0	(Costa Rican Football Federation) Herediano
	DF	Juan Diego Madrigal	May 21, 1987 (aged 25)	0	0	(Costa Rican Football Federation) Santos de Guápiles
	DF	Waylon Francis	September 25, 1988 (aged 24)	0	0	(Costa Rican Football Federation) Herediano
	MF	Celso Borges	May 27, 1988 (aged 24)	40	10	(Swedish Football Association) AIK
	MF	Rodney Wallace	June 17, 1988 (aged 24)	9	2	(United States Soccer Federation) Portland Timbers
	MF	Yeltsin Tejeda	March 17, 1992 (aged 20)	8	0	(Costa Rican Football Federation) Saprissa
	MF	Luis Miguel Valle	May 11, 1989 (aged 23)	2	0	(Costa Rican Football Federation) Alajuelense
	MF	Ariel Rodríguez	April 22, 1986 (aged 26)	0	0	(Costa Rican Football Federation) Pérez Zeledón
	MF	Osvaldo Rodríguez	December 17, 1990 (aged 22)	0	0	(Costa Rican Football Federation) Santos de Guápiles
	MF	Delberth Cameron	September 25, 1981 (aged 31)	0	0	(Costa Rican Football Federation) Limón
	FW	Álvaro Saborío	March 22, 1982 (aged 30)	76	29	(United States Soccer Federation) Real Salt Lake
	FW	Randall Brenes	August 13, 1983 (aged 29)	27	7	(Costa Rican Football Federation) Cartaginés
	FW	Jairo Arrieta	August 25, 1983 (aged 29)	4	0	(United States Soccer Federation) Columbus Crew
	FW	Cristian Lagos	August 17, 1984 (aged 28)	1	0	(Costa Rican Football Federation) Saprissa

=== Guatemala ===
Head coach: (Paraguay) Ever Hugo Almeida

No.	Pos.	Player	Date of birth (age)	Caps	Goals	Club
	GK	Paulo César Motta	March 29, 1982 (aged 30)	12	0	(National Football Federation of Guatemala) Antigua
	GK	Cristian Álvarez	May 21, 1982 (aged 29)	2	0	(National Football Federation of Guatemala) Municipal
	GK	Jaime Carbajal	February 7, 1986 (aged 26)	1	0	(National Football Federation of Guatemala) USAC
	DF	Claudio Albizuris	June 1, 1981 (aged 31)	36	1	(National Football Federation of Guatemala) Municipal
	DF	Cristian Noriega	March 20, 1987 (aged 24)	29	0	(National Football Federation of Guatemala) Municipal
	DF	Elías Vásquez	June 18, 1992 (aged 20)	11	0	(National Football Federation of Guatemala) Comunicaciones
	DF	Rubén Morales	June 4, 1987 (aged 25)	4	0	(National Football Federation of Guatemala) Cobán Imperial
	MF	Hector Moreira	December 27, 1987 (aged 25)	1	0	(National Football Federation of Guatemala) USAC
	MF	José Manuel Contreras	January 19, 1986 (aged 26)	41	2	(National Football Federation of Guatemala) Comunicaciones
	MF	Jonathan López	May 10, 1988 (aged 24)	27	0	(National Football Federation of Guatemala) Marquense
	MF	Wilfred Velásquez	September 10, 1985 (aged 27)	27	0	(National Football Federation of Guatemala) Suchitepéquez
	MF	Marco Ciani	March 7, 1987 (aged 25)	12	0	(National Football Federation of Guatemala) C.S.D. Municipal
	MF	Nelson Miranda	December 21, 1990 (aged 22)	2	0	(National Football Federation of Guatemala) Heredia
	MF	Sergio Trujillo	November 19, 1987 (aged 25)	2	0	(National Football Federation of Guatemala) Municipal
	MF	David Espinoza	August 17, 1980 (aged 32)	1	0	(National Football Federation of Guatemala) Heredia
	FW	Minor López	February 1, 1987 (aged 25)	22	5	(National Football Federation of Guatemala) Deportivo Marquense
	FW	Jairo Arreola	September 20, 1985 (aged 27)	14	0	(National Football Federation of Guatemala) Comunicaciones
	FW	Robin Bethancourt	November 25, 1991 (aged 21)	1	0	(National Football Federation of Guatemala) Heredia
	MF	Kevin Arriola	August 3, 1991 (aged 21)	1	0	(National Football Federation of Guatemala) Xelajú
	FW	Kendel Herrarte	April 6, 1992 (aged 20)	0	0	(National Football Federation of Guatemala) Comunicaciones
	FW	Edward Santeliz	June 18, 1987 (aged 25)	0	0	(National Football Federation of Guatemala) Malacateco

=== Nicaragua ===
Head coach: (Spain) Enrique Llena

No.	Pos.	Player	Date of birth (age)	Caps	Goals	Club
1	GK	Denis Espinoza	25 August 1983 (aged 29)	22	1	(Nicaraguan Football Federation) Deportivo Walter Ferretti
12	GK	Justo Lorente	27 February 1984 (aged 28)			(Nicaraguan Football Federation) Real Esteli
22	GK	Josimar Narváez				(Nicaraguan Football Federation) Diriangén
3	DF	Josue Quijano	10 March 1991 (aged 21)	8	0	(Nicaraguan Football Federation) Deportivo Walter Ferretti
7	DF	Donald Parrales	28 November 1989 (aged 23)	4	0	(Nicaraguan Football Federation) Deportivo Walter Ferretti
2	DF	Maximo Gamez	28 November 1989 (aged 23)	1	0	(Nicaraguan Football Federation) Managua
23	DF	Marlon Medina	March 6, 1985 (aged 27)	1	0	(Nicaraguan Football Federation) Real Estelí
19	DF	Salvador García Acuña	March 13, 1982 (aged 30)	1	0	(Nicaraguan Football Federation) Real Estelí
6	DF	Alejandro Tapia	March 28, 1993 (aged 19)	1	0	(Nicaraguan Football Federation) Diriangén
20	DF	Nasser Ivan Valverde Baltodano	January 4, 1993 (aged 20)	0	0	(Nicaraguan Football Federation) Diriangén
17	MF	Felix Zeledón	24 November 1983 (aged 29)	16	1	(Nicaraguan Football Federation) Deportivo Walter Ferretti
21	MF	Félix Rodríguez	27 April 1984 (aged 28)	10	2	(Nicaraguan Football Federation) Real Estelí
10	MF	David Solorzano	5 November 1980 (aged 32)	18	1	(Nicaraguan Football Federation) Diriangén
13	MF	Elvis Pinel	22 March 1992 (aged 20)	1	0	(Nicaraguan Football Federation) Real Estelí
8	MF	Manuel Rosas	10 August 1986 (aged 26)	0	0	(Nicaraguan Football Federation) Real Estelí
18	MF	Axel Villanueva	10 August 1989 (aged 23)	8	2	(Nicaraguan Football Federation) Deportivo Walter Ferretti
4	FW	Samuel Wilson	4 April 1983 (aged 29)	20	4	(Nicaraguan Football Federation) Real Estelí
11	FW	Daniel Reyes	21 July 1990 (aged 22)	4	2	(Brazilian Football Confederation) Esporte Clube Tigres do Brasil
14	FW	Henry Garcia	21 July 1990 (aged 22)	2	0	(Nicaraguan Football Federation) Juventus Managua
16	FW	Raúl Leguías	9 October 1982 (aged 30)	7	2	(Angolan Football Federation) Bravos do Maquis
19	FW	Carlos Chavarría	9 October 1993 (aged 19)	0	0	(Nicaraguan Football Federation) Real Estelí F.C.

== Group B ==
=== El Salvador ===
Head coach: (Peru) Agustín Castillo

No.	Pos.	Player	Date of birth (age)	Caps	Goals	Club
	GK	Dagoberto Portillo	November 16, 1979 (aged 33)	22	0	(Salvadoran Football Federation) Luis Angel Firpo
	GK	Derby Carrillo	September 19, 1987 (aged 25)	0	0	(Salvadoran Football Federation) Santa Tecla
	GK	Luis Contreras	October 27, 1982 (aged 30)	0	0	(Salvadoran Football Federation) FAS
	DF	Xavier Garcia	June 26, 1990 (aged 22)	29	1	(Salvadoran Football Federation) Luis Ángel Firpo
	DF	José Henríquez	May 24, 1987 (aged 25)	25	0	(Salvadoran Football Federation) Águila
	DF	Carlos Monteagudo	April 29, 1985 (aged 27)	22	1	(Salvadoran Football Federation) Luis Ángel Firpo
	DF	Milton Molina	February 2, 1989 (aged 23)	5	0	(Salvadoran Football Federation) Isidro Metapán
	DF	Alexander Larin	June 27, 1992 (aged 20)	4	0	(Salvadoran Football Federation) FAS
	DF	Néstor Renderos	September 10, 1988 (aged 24)	0	0	(Salvadoran Football Federation) FAS
	DF	José Granadino	September 28, 1988 (aged 24)	0	0	(Salvadoran Football Federation) FAS
	MF	Cristian Castillo	July 27, 1984 (aged 28)	43	3	(Salvadoran Football Federation) Alianza
	MF	Andrés Flores	August 31, 1990 (aged 22)	24	0	(Salvadoran Football Federation) Isidro Metapán
	MF	Isidro Gutiérrez	October 21, 1989 (aged 23)	9	2	(Salvadoran Football Federation) Águila
	MF	Herbert Sosa	January 11, 1990 (aged 23)	9	2	(Salvadoran Football Federation) Alianza
	MF	Darwin Ceren	December 31, 1989 (aged 23)	5	0	(Salvadoran Football Federation) Juventud Independiente
	MF	Darwin Bonilla	August 6, 1990 (aged 22)	0	0	(Salvadoran Football Federation) Águila
	MF	Gerson Mayén	February 9, 1989 (aged 23)	0	0	(Salvadoran Football Federation) FAS
	MF	Richard Menjivar	December 31, 1990 (aged 22)	0	0	(Danish Football Association) Blokhus
	FW	Rafael Burgos	June 3, 1988 (aged 24)	22	9	(Hungarian Football Federation) Kecskeméti
	FW	Léster Blanco	February 17, 1989 (aged 23)	23	5	(National Autonomous Federation of Football of Honduras) Marathón
	FW	Nelson Bonilla	September 11, 1990 (aged 22)	7	2	(Salvadoran Football Federation) Alianza

=== Honduras ===
Head coach: (Colombia) Luis Fernando Suárez

No.	Pos.	Player	Date of birth (age)	Caps	Goals	Club
	GK	Donis Escober	February 3, 1980 (aged 32)	17	0	(National Autonomous Federation of Football of Honduras) Olimpia
	GK	Kevin Hernández	December 21, 1985 (aged 27)	1	0	(National Autonomous Federation of Football of Honduras) Real España
	GK	José Mendoza	April 13, 1989 (aged 23)	0	0	(National Autonomous Federation of Football of Honduras) Platense
	DF	Víctor Bernárdez	May 24, 1982 (aged 30)	59	3	(United States Soccer Federation) San Jose Earthquakes
	DF	Juan Carlos Garcia	March 8, 1988 (aged 24)	15	0	(National Autonomous Federation of Football of Honduras) Olimpia
	DF	Brayan Beckeles	November 28, 1985 (aged 27)	10	0	(National Autonomous Federation of Football of Honduras) Olimpia
	DF	Arnold Peralta	March 29, 1989 (aged 23)	6	0	(National Autonomous Federation of Football of Honduras) Vida
	DF	Wilmer Crisanto	September 19, 1989 (aged 23)	5	0	(National Autonomous Federation of Football of Honduras) Victoria
	DF	Orlin Peralta	February 12, 1990 (aged 22)	2	0	(National Autonomous Federation of Football of Honduras) Vida
	DF	José David Velásquez	December 8, 1989 (aged 23)	2	0	(National Autonomous Federation of Football of Honduras) Victoria
	DF	Juan Pablo Montes	October 26, 1985 (aged 27)	0	0	(National Autonomous Federation of Football of Honduras) Platense
	MF	Óscar García	September 4, 1984 (aged 28)	74	1	(United States Soccer Federation) Houston Dynamo
	MF	Marvin Chávez	November 3, 1983 (aged 29)	30	3	(United States Soccer Federation) San Jose Earthquakes
	MF	Mario Martínez	July 30, 1989 (aged 23)	22	3	(United States Soccer Federation) Seattle Sounders FC
	MF	Miguel Castillo	September 30, 1989 (aged 23)	5	0	(National Autonomous Federation of Football of Honduras) Victoria
	MF	Luis Garrido	November 5, 1990 (aged 22)	3	0	(National Autonomous Federation of Football of Honduras) Olimpia
	FW	Georgie Welcome	March 9, 1985 (aged 27)	28	4	(National Autonomous Federation of Football of Honduras) Motagua
	FW	Jerry Bengtson	April 8, 1987 (aged 25)	27	13	(United States Soccer Federation) New England Revolution
	FW	Mitchel Brown	July 16, 1981 (aged 31)	2	0	(National Autonomous Federation of Football of Honduras) Marathón
	FW	Júnior Lacayo	August 24, 1995 (aged 17)	0	0	(National Autonomous Federation of Football of Honduras) Victoria
	FW	Luis Lobo	December 26, 1987 (aged 25)	0	0	(National Autonomous Federation of Football of Honduras) Real España

=== Panama ===
Head coach: (Panama) Julio Dely Valdés

No.	Pos.	Player	Date of birth (age)	Caps	Goals	Club
	GK	Jaime Penedo	September 26, 1981 (aged 31)	78	0	(National Football Federation of Guatemala) Municipal
	GK	Kevin Melgar	November 19, 1992 (aged 20)	3	0	(Panamanian Football Federation) Alianza
	GK	Álex Rodríguez	August 5, 1990 (aged 22)	2	0	(Panamanian Football Federation) Sporting San Miguelito
	DF	Román Torres	March 20, 1986 (aged 26)	59	1	(Colombian Football Federation) Millonarios FC
	DF	Eduardo Dasent	October 12, 1988 (aged 24)	16	0	(Panamanian Football Federation) Tauro
	DF	Jean Carlos Cedeño	September 7, 1985 (aged 27)	15	0	(Panamanian Football Federation) Alianza
	DF	Harold Cummings	March 1, 1992 (aged 20)	10	0	(Panamanian Football Federation) Árabe Unido
	DF	Carlos Rodríguez	April 12, 1990 (aged 22)	8	0	(Panamanian Football Federation) Chepo
	DF	Érick Vásquez	January 8, 1988 (aged 25)	8	0	(Panamanian Football Federation) Chorrillo
	DF	Leonel Parrish	March 16, 1982 (aged 30)	4	0	(Panamanian Football Federation) Tauro
	DF	Richard Dixon	March 28, 1992 (aged 20)	2	0	(Panamanian Football Federation) Sporting San Miguelito
	MF	Juan Pérez	January 1, 1980 (aged 33)	29	0	(Panamanian Football Federation) Tauro
	MF	Alberto Quintero	December 18, 1987 (aged 25)	26	2	(Panamanian Football Federation) Chorrillo
	MF	Aníbal Godoy	February 10, 1990 (aged 22)	25	0	(Panamanian Football Federation) Chepo
	MF	Eybir Bonaga	May 19, 1986 (aged 26)	17	1	(Panamanian Football Federation) San Francisco
	MF	Marcos Sánchez	December 23, 1989 (aged 23)	14	1	(Panamanian Football Federation) Tauro
	MF	Jair Carrasquilla	April 27, 1984 (aged 28)	1	0	(Panamanian Football Federation) Plaza Amador
	FW	Blas Pérez	March 13, 1981 (aged 31)	66	26	(United States Soccer Federation) Dallas
	FW	Orlando Rodríguez	August 9, 1984 (aged 28)	15	1	(Panamanian Football Federation) Árabe Unido
	FW	Rolando Blackburn	January 9, 1990 (aged 23)	7	2	(Slovak Football Association) Senica
	FW	Alcibíades Rojas	August 15, 1986 (aged 26)	1	0	(Panamanian Football Federation) Atlético Chiriquí
