= 2014 Copa Centroamericana squads =

The provisional rosters were published by UNCAF on 19 August 2014. The pre-competition final rosters were released on 1 September 2014.

Each participating team had to register a minimum of 18 and a maximum of 21 players to play in the competition, of which three of those players must be goalkeepers. Teams could replace up to six players in the roster with players on the provisional list of 50 players between the second and third games in the competition.

On 9 September, UNCAF and CONCACAF published changes made by teams following the second game. In total nine players were withdrawn and replaced.

== Belize ==
Head coach: (Costa Rica) Leroy Sherrier Lewis

No.	Pos.	Player	Date of birth (age)	Club
	GK	Woodrow West	19 September 1985 (aged 28)	(Football Federation of Belize) Belmopan Bandits
	DF	Frank Lopez		(Football Federation of Belize) Belize Defence Force FC
	GK	Shane Orio		(National Football Federation of Guatemala) C.D. Suchitepéquez
	DF	Dalton Eiley		(Football Federation of Belize) Placencia Assassins
	DF	Ian Gaynair		(Football Federation of Belize) Belmopan Bandits
	DF	Evral Reginald Trapp		(Football Federation of Belize) Belmopan Bandits
	DF	Elroy Smith		(National Autonomous Federation of Football of Honduras) Deportes Savio
	DF	Felix Salvador Miranda		(Football Federation of Belize) Belmopan Bandits
	MF	Andres Makin		(Football Federation of Belize) Police United FC
	MF	Harrison Roches		(National Autonomous Federation of Football of Honduras) C.D. Marathón
	MF	Denmark Casey		(Football Federation of Belize) Belmopan Bandits
	MF	Daniel Jimenez		(Football Federation of Belize) Belize Defence Force FC
	MF	Delone Darren Torres		(Football Federation of Belize) Sagitun
	MF	Trevor Lennen		(Football Federation of Belize) Police United FC
	MF	John King	13 November 1993 (aged 20)	(Football Federation of Belize) Belize Defence Force FC
	FW	Deon McCaulay	20 September 1987 (aged 26)	(United States Soccer Federation) Atlanta Silverbacks
	FW	Jarret Nicholas Davis		(Football Federation of Belize) FC Belize
	FW	Evan Mariano		(Football Federation of Belize) Police United FC
	FW	Highking Roberts		(Football Federation of Belize) Police United FC
	FW	Jerome James		(Football Federation of Belize) Belmopan Bandits
	FW	Clifton Jair West		(Football Federation of Belize) Police United FC

== Costa Rica ==
Head coach: (Costa Rica) Paulo Wanchope

No.	Pos.	Player	Date of birth (age)	Club
1	GK	Daniel Cambronero	1 December 1987 (aged 26)	(Costa Rican Football Federation) Herediano
18	GK	Patrick Pemberton	24 April 1982 (aged 32)	(Costa Rican Football Federation) Alajuelense
13	GK	Kevin Briceño	21 October 1991 (aged 22)	(Costa Rican Football Federation) Saprissa
17	DF	Dave Myrie	1 June 1988 (aged 26)	(Costa Rican Football Federation) Herediano
4	DF	Juan Diego Madrigal	21 May 1987 (aged 27)	(Costa Rican Football Federation) Cartaginés
6	DF	Oscar Duarte (Note: Duarte was removed from the squad after two match dates.)	3 June 1989 (aged 25)	(Royal Belgian Football Association) Club Brugge KV
26	DF	Pablo Salazar	21 November 1982 (aged 31)	(Costa Rican Football Federation) Herediano
3	DF	Porfirio Lopez	10 September 1985 (aged 28)	(Costa Rican Football Federation) Alajuelense
2	DF	Jhonny Acosta	21 July 1983 (aged 31)	(Costa Rican Football Federation) Alajuelense
14	DF	Christopher Meneses	2 May 1990 (aged 24)	(Swedish Football Association) IFK Norrköping
19	DF	Roy Miller (Note: Miller was added to the squad after two match dates.)	24 November 1984 (aged 29)	(United States Soccer Federation) New York Red Bulls
11	MF	Jose Sanchez (Note: Sanchez was added to the squad after two match dates.)	20 May 1987 (aged 27)	(Costa Rican Football Federation) Herediano
23	MF	Juan Gabriel Bustos	9 July 1992 (aged 22)	(Costa Rican Football Federation) Saprissa
25	MF	Manfred Russell (Note: Russell was added to the squad after two match dates.)	25 September 1988 (aged 25)	(Costa Rican Football Federation) Saprissa
8	MF	Esteban Granados	25 October 1985 (aged 28)	(Costa Rican Football Federation) Herediano
22	MF	Jose Miguel Cubero	14 February 1987 (aged 27)	(The Football Association) Blackpool F.C.
5	MF	Celso Borges (Note: Borges was removed from the squad after two match dates.)	27 May 1988 (aged 26)	(Swedish Football Association) AIK
16	MF	Johan Condega	15 March 1984 (aged 30)	(Costa Rican Football Federation) Cartaginés
20	MF	Rodney Wallace (Note: Wallace was removed from the squad after two match dates.)	17 June 1988 (aged 26)	(United States Soccer Federation) Portland Timbers
24	FW	Johan Venegas	27 November 1988 (aged 25)	(Costa Rican Football Federation) Alajuelense
12	FW	Joel Campbell (Note: Campbell was removed from the squad after two match dates.)	26 June 1992 (aged 22)	(The Football Association) Arsenal F.C.
21	FW	Marco Ureña (Note: Ureña was removed from the squad after two match dates.)	5 March 1990 (aged 24)	(Russian Football Union) FC Kuban Krasnodar
9	FW	Jonathan Moya (Note: Moya was added to the squad after two match dates.)	6 January 1992 (aged 22)	(Costa Rican Football Federation) Uruguay
7	FW	David Ramírez	28 May 1993 (aged 21)	(Costa Rican Football Federation) Saprissa
15	FW	Armando Alonso	21 March 1984 (aged 30)	(Costa Rican Football Federation) Alajuelense
10	FW	Bryan Ruiz (Note: Ruiz was added to the squad after two match dates.)	18 August 1985 (aged 29)	(The Football Association) Fulham

== El Salvador ==
Head coach: (Spain) Albert Roca

No.	Pos.	Player	Date of birth (age)	Club
1	GK	Henry Hernández	4 January 1985 (aged 29)	(Salvadoran Football Federation) Isidro Metapán
2	DF	Xavier Garcia	26 June 1990 (aged 24)	(Salvadoran Football Federation) FAS
3	DF	Milton Molina	2 February 1989 (aged 25)	(Salvadoran Football Federation) Isidro Metapán
4	DF	Ibsen Castro	24 October 1988 (aged 25)	(Salvadoran Football Federation) Águila
5	DF	Alexander Mendoza	4 June 1990 (aged 24)	(Salvadoran Football Federation) FAS
6	MF	Richard Menjivar	31 October 1990 (aged 23)	(United States Soccer Federation) San Antonio Scorpions
7	MF	Marvin Monterrosa	3 March 1991 (aged 23)	(Salvadoran Football Federation) Isidro Metapán
8	MF	Darwin Cerén	31 December 1989 (aged 24)	(United States Soccer Federation) Orlando City
9	FW	Rafael Burgos	3 June 1988 (aged 26)	(United States Soccer Federation) Minnesota United
10	MF	Kevin Santamaria	21 January 1991 (aged 23)	(National Football Federation of Guatemala) Municipal
11	FW	Jonathan Águila	11 November 1990 (aged 23)	(Salvadoran Football Federation) FAS
12	MF	Arturo Alvarez	28 June 1985 (aged 29)	(Hungarian Football Federation) Videoton
13	MF	Alexander Larín	27 June 1992 (aged 22)	(Costa Rican Football Federation) Herediano
14	MF	Andrés Flores	31 August 1990 (aged 24)	(United States Soccer Federation) New York Cosmos
15	DF	Nestor Renderos	10 September 1988 (aged 25)	(Salvadoran Football Federation) Santa Tecla
16	MF	Narciso Orellana	28 January 1995 (aged 19)	(Salvadoran Football Federation) Isidro Metapán
17	DF	Juan Barahona	12 February 1996 (aged 18)	(Salvadoran Football Federation) Santa Tecla
18	GK	Élmer Iglesias	5 May 1992 (aged 22)	(Salvadoran Football Federation) Alianza
19	MF	Junior Burgos	14 August 1988 (aged 26)	(United States Soccer Federation) Atlanta Silverbacks
20	FW	Denis Pineda	1 April 1996 (aged 18)	(Mexican Football Federation) UANL
22	GK	Derby Carrillo	19 September 1987 (aged 26)	(Salvadoran Football Federation) Santa Tecla

== Guatemala ==
Head coach: (Argentina) Iván Franco Sopegno

No.	Pos.	Player	Date of birth (age)	Club
	GK	Ricardo Antonio Jerez		(Colombian Football Federation) Alianza Petrolera
	GK	Luis Pedro Molina	4 June 1977 (aged 37)	(National Football Federation of Guatemala) Marquense
	GK	Paulo Cesar Motta	29 March 1982 (aged 32)	(National Football Federation of Guatemala) Mictlán
	DF	Carlos Mauricio Castrillo		(National Football Federation of Guatemala) Comunicaciones
	DF	Carlos Eduardo Gallardo		(National Football Federation of Guatemala) Marquense
	DF	Johny Giron		(National Football Federation of Guatemala) Xelajú
	DF	Wilson Lalin		(National Football Federation of Guatemala) Comunicaciones
	DF	Rafael Morales	6 April 1988 (aged 26)	(Costa Rican Football Federation) Saprissa
	DF	Elias Vasquez		(Mexican Football Federation) Dorados de Sinaloa
	MF	Jorge Aparicio		(National Football Federation of Guatemala) Comunicaciones
	MF	Marvin Avila		(National Football Federation of Guatemala) Municipal
	MF	Gerardo Arias		(National Football Federation of Guatemala) Petapa
	MF	José Manuel Contreras		(National Football Federation of Guatemala) Comunicaciones
	FW	Kendal Herrarte		(National Football Federation of Guatemala) Comunicaciones
	MF	Carlos Mejia		(National Football Federation of Guatemala) Comunicaciones
	MF	Jean Marquez		(National Football Federation of Guatemala) Comunicaciones
	FW	Jairo Arreola		(National Football Federation of Guatemala) Comunicaciones
	FW	Marvin Ceballos		(National Football Federation of Guatemala) Comunicaciones
	MF	Marco Pappa		(United States Soccer Federation) Seattle Sounders FC
	FW	Nelson Enrique Miranda		(National Football Federation of Guatemala) Comunicaciones
	FW	Carlos Ruiz		(National Football Federation of Guatemala) Municipal

== Honduras ==
Head coach: (Costa Rica) Hernán Medford

No.	Pos.	Player	Date of birth (age)	Club
	GK	Luis López Fernández	3 September 1993 (aged 21)	(National Autonomous Federation of Football of Honduras) Real España
	GK	Kevin Hernandez	21 December 1985 (aged 28)	(National Autonomous Federation of Football of Honduras) Real España
	GK	Yul Arzu	21 October 1986 (aged 27)	(National Autonomous Federation of Football of Honduras) Marathón
	DF	Bryan Acosta	24 November 1993 (aged 20)	(National Autonomous Federation of Football of Honduras) Real España
	DF	Henry Figueroa	28 December 1992 (aged 21)	(National Autonomous Federation of Football of Honduras) Motagua
	DF	Juan Pablo Montes	26 October 1985 (aged 28)	(National Autonomous Federation of Football of Honduras) Motagua
	DF	Wilfredo Barahona	31 January 1983 (aged 31)	(National Autonomous Federation of Football of Honduras) Real España
	DF	Wilmer Crisanto	24 June 1989 (aged 25)	(National Autonomous Federation of Football of Honduras) Motagua
	DF	Javier Portillo	10 June 1981 (aged 33)	(National Autonomous Federation of Football of Honduras) Olimpia
	DF	Romell Quioto (Note: Quioto was removed from the squad after two match dates.)	9 August 1991 (aged 23)	(National Autonomous Federation of Football of Honduras) Olimpia
	DF	Johnny Leveron	7 February 1990 (aged 24)	(Canadian Soccer Association) Vancouver Whitecaps FC
	DF	Erick Norales	11 February 1985 (aged 29)	(United States Soccer Federation) Indy Eleven
	MF	Edder Delgado	20 November 1986 (aged 27)	(National Autonomous Federation of Football of Honduras) Real España
	MF	Diego Reyes	11 January 1990 (aged 24)	(National Autonomous Federation of Football of Honduras) Marathón
	MF	Juan Rodriguez	16 January 1988 (aged 26)	(National Autonomous Federation of Football of Honduras) Parrillas One
	MF	Carlos Discua	20 September 1984 (aged 29)	(National Autonomous Federation of Football of Honduras) Motagua
	MF	Wilmer Fuentes (Note: Fuentes was added to the squad after two match dates.)	21 April 1992 (aged 22)	(National Autonomous Federation of Football of Honduras) Marathón
	MF	Mario Martinez (Note: Martínez was removed from the squad after two match dates.)	30 July 1989 (aged 25)	(Ecuadorian Football Federation) Barcelona Sporting Club
	FW	Bryan Róchez	1 January 1995 (aged 19)	(National Autonomous Federation of Football of Honduras) Real España
	FW	Rony Martínez (Note: Martínez was added to the squad after two match dates.)	16 August 1987 (aged 27)	(National Autonomous Federation of Football of Honduras) Real Sociedad
	FW	Anthony Lozano	25 April 1993 (aged 21)	(National Autonomous Federation of Football of Honduras) Olimpia
	FW	Carlos Will Mejía	29 September 1983 (aged 30)	(National Autonomous Federation of Football of Honduras) Olimpia
	FW	Jonathan Mejía	7 January 1989 (aged 25)	(Royal Spanish Football Federation) Cádiz CF

== Nicaragua ==
Head coach: (Spain) Enrique Llena

No.	Pos.	Player	Date of birth (age)	Club
	GK	Justo Lorente	27 February 1984 (aged 30)	(Nicaraguan Football Federation) Real Estelí F.C.
	GK	Lester Jose Acevedo		(Nicaraguan Football Federation) Diriangén FC
	DF	Donald Parrales		(Nicaraguan Football Federation) Deportivo Walter Ferretti
	DF	Alejandro Tapia		(Nicaraguan Football Federation) Deportivo Walter Ferretti
	DF	Luis Fernando Copete	12 February 1989 (aged 25)	(Nicaraguan Football Federation) Deportivo Walter Ferretti
	MF	Jason Casco		(Nicaraguan Football Federation) Deportivo Walter Ferretti
	DF	David Solarzano		(Nicaraguan Football Federation) Diriangén FC
	DF	Erick Tellez		(Nicaraguan Football Federation) Diriangén FC
	DF	Manuel Rosas		(Nicaraguan Football Federation) Real Estelí F.C.
	DF	Josue Quijano		(Nicaraguan Football Federation) Deportivo Walter Ferretti
	MF	Elmer Mejia		(Nicaraguan Football Federation) Real Estelí F.C.
	MF	Medardo Martinez		(Nicaraguan Football Federation) Managua F.C.
	MF	Walmer Otero		(United States Soccer Federation) CCSF Rams
	MF	Elvis Pinel		(Nicaraguan Football Federation) Real Estelí F.C.
	FW	Javier Dolmo		(Nicaraguan Football Federation) Deportivo Walter Ferretti
	FW	Eulises Pavon	6 January 1993 (aged 21)	(Nicaraguan Football Federation) Diriangén FC
	FW	Juan Barrera		(Nicaraguan Football Federation) Real Estelí F.C.
	FW	Daniel Cadena	9 February 1987 (aged 27)	(Nicaraguan Football Federation) Deportivo Walter Ferretti

== Panama ==
Head coach: (Colombia) Hernán Darío Gómez

No.	Pos.	Player	Date of birth (age)	Club
	GK	Jaime Penedo	26 September 1981 (aged 32)	(United States Soccer Federation) LA Galaxy
	GK	Óscar McFarlane	29 November 1980 (aged 33)	(Costa Rican Football Federation) Pérez Zeledón
	DF	Adolfo Machado	14 February 1985 (aged 29)	(Costa Rican Football Federation) Saprissa
	DF	Angel Patrick	27 February 1992 (aged 22)	(Panamanian Football Federation) Árabe Unido
	DF	Carlos Rodríguez	12 April 1990 (aged 24)	(Colombian Football Federation) Fortaleza
	DF	Erick Davis	31 March 1991 (aged 23)	(Panamanian Football Federation) Sporting San Miguelito
	DF	Harold Cummings	1 March 1992 (aged 22)	(Peruvian Football Federation) Juan Aurich
	DF	Richard Peralta	20 September 1993 (aged 20)	(Panamanian Football Federation) Alianza
	DF	Roberto Chen	24 May 1994 (aged 20)	(Royal Spanish Football Federation) Málaga
	DF	Román Torres	20 March 1986 (aged 28)	(Colombian Football Federation) Millonarios
	MF	Alberto Quintero	18 December 1987 (aged 26)	(Mexican Football Federation) Zacatecas
	MF	Amílcar Henríquez	2 August 1983 (aged 31)	(Panamanian Football Federation) Árabe Unido
	MF	Armando Cooper	26 November 1987 (aged 26)	(Argentine Football Association) Godoy Cruz
	MF	Gabriel Gómez	29 May 1984 (aged 30)	(Costa Rican Football Federation) Herediano
	MF	Rolando Escobar	24 October 1981 (aged 32)	(Venezuelan Football Federation) Deportivo Anzoátegui
	FW	Alfredo Stephens (Note: Stephens was removed from the squad after two match dates.)	25 December 1994 (aged 19)	(Panamanian Football Federation) Chorrillo
	FW	Blas Pérez	13 March 1981 (aged 33)	(United States Soccer Federation) Dallas
	FW	Darwin Pinzon	2 April 1994 (aged 20)	(Panamanian Football Federation) Sporting San Miguelito
	FW	Nicolás Muñoz (Note: Muñoz was removed from the squad after two match dates.)	21 December 1981 (aged 32)	(Salvadoran Football Federation) Isidro Metapán
	FW	Roberto Nurse	16 December 1983 (aged 30)	(Mexican Football Federation) UAT
	FW	Gabriel Torres (Note: Torres was added to the squad after two match dates.)	31 October 1988 (aged 25)	(United States Soccer Federation) Colorado Rapids
	FW	Francisco Narbon (Note: Narbon was added to the squad after two match dates.)	11 February 1995 (aged 19)	(United States Soccer Federation) James Madison University
