= Dale Pelayo Sr. =

Belizean footballer and coach (born 1977)

Personal information
- Full name: Dale Daniel Pelayo, Sr.
- Date of birth: 2 March 1977 (age 49)
- Place of birth: Roaring Creek, Belize
- Position: Forward

Senior career*
Years	Team	Apps	(Gls)
1998-1999	Juventud Benqueña	?	(11)
2001	Griga United	?	(?)
2002-2003	Real Verdes	?	(?)
2006	Belmopan United	?	(?)
2016	Belmopan Bandits	?	(?)

International career
1997–1998	Belize U-23	?	(?)
1998	Belize	2	(0)

Managerial career
- 2018-2019: Police United
- 2018: Belize U-16
- 2018-2019: Belize U-17
- 2019: Wagiya
- 2019-2020: Belize U-20
- 2020–2021: Belize
- * Club domestic league appearances and goals

Dale Daniel Pelayo Sr. (born 2 March 1977), is a Beliezean football coach and former player, who was formerly the coach of the Belize national team.

== Biography ==
Dale Pelayo Sr. was born in Roaring Creek, Belize, in the Cayo District on 2 March 1977.

=== Club career ===
He appeared in the Belizean league, with the well-known club Juventud Benqueña, from the 1998–99 season, with 11 goals he became the leading scorers of the league. He also played with Griga United FC, Real Verdes, Belmopan United, and Belmopan Bandits.

=== International career ===
Pelayo has played for the various youth national teams. With the U-21 national team he participated in the qualifying rounds for the Games of Central America and the Caribbean 1998.

In March 1999, Pelayo was called up by coach Manuel Bilches of Argentina to the Belize senior team for the UNCAF Nations Cup. There he played in both matches - on March 17 as a substitute against Costa Rica, with the result of 0–7, and two days later in the first line-up with Honduras, with the score of 1–5. Belize was eliminated from the tournament in the group stage.

=== Coaching career ===
Pelayo became a coach after his football career ended in 2016. He started as an assistant coach to Kent Gabourel with the Belmopan Bandits in 2017.

He was then signed with Police United FC, as he was initially as an assistant coach, and later promoted as the coach during the 2018–19 season. He also coached of Wayiga in 2019.

He worked as a coach for the various youth levels of Belize national teams. In addition, he was assistant coach to Palmiro Salas of Guatemala in the senior team from 2018 to 2019.

In July 2020, Pelayo became the coach of the Belize senior team.
