= Medardo =

Medardo is a masculine given name. Persons with the name include:

- Medardo Fantuzzi (1906–1986), Italian automotive engineer
- Medardo R. Farías (1989–1960), Uruguayan general
- Medardo Flores (1949–2011), Honduran journalist
- Medardo Galli (1907–1985), Italian rower
- Medardo Geslani, Filipino brigadier general
- Medardo González (born 1952), Salvadoran politician
- Medardo Griotto (1901–1943), Italian communist activist
- Medardo Lamberti (1890–1986), Italian rower
- Medardo Luis Luzardo Romero (1934–2018), Venezuelan archbishop
- Medardo Mairena (born c. 1977), Nicaraguan peasant leader
- Medardo Martínez (born 1988), Nicaraguan footballer
- Medardo Joseph Mazombwe (1931–2013), Zambian cardinal
- Medardo Rosso (1858–1928), Italian sculptor
- Medardo Ángel Silva (1898–1919), Ecuadorian poet

== See also ==
- Medard (name), including lists of people with the given name or surname
