= Palmiro =

Palmiro is a male Italian given name. Notable people with the name include:

- Palmiro Di Dio (born 1985), Italian footballer
- Palmiro Masciarelli (born 1953), Italian racing cyclist
- Palmiro Salas (born 1964), Guatemalan football coach
- Palmiro Serafini (1945–2013), Italian ski mountaineer
- Palmiro Togliatti (1893–1964), Italian politician
