= Jean Cedeño =

Panamanian footballer (born 1985)

Personal information
- Full name: Jean Carlos Cedeño Preciado
- Date of birth: 7 September 1985 (age 41)
- Place of birth: Panama
- Height: 1.85 m (6 ft 1 in)
- Position: Defender

Team information
- Current team: Santa Gema

Senior career*
Years	Team	Apps	(Gls)
2007–2010	Chorrillo		
2010–2011	Juventud Retalteca		(2)
2011–2012	Chorrillo		
2012–2013	Alianza	33	(0)
2014–2016	Árabe Unido	43	(2)
2016–2017	Atlético Nacional	24	(1)
2017	Chorrillo	5	(0)
2017–2018	Alianza	16	(0)
2018–	Santa Gema	3	(0)

International career^{‡}
2010–2013	Panama	21	(0)
- * Club domestic league appearances and goals as of 5 August 2019 ‡ National team caps and goals as of 7 June 2015

Jean Carlos Cedeño Preciado (born 7 September 1985) is a Panamanian footballer who currently plays for Árabe Unido.

== Club career ==
Cedeño played for Chorrillo before moving abroad to play alongside compatriots Alcibiades Rojas and Rolando Blackburn at Guatemalan side Juventud Retalteca. Back in Panama he played for Chorrillo and Alianza.

He joined Árabe Unido in January 2014.

== International career ==
He made his debut for Panama in a December 2010 friendly match against Honduras and has, as of May 2015, earned a total of 20 caps, scoring no goals. He represented his country in 4 FIFA World Cup qualification matches and played at the 2011 and 2013 Copa Centroamericana as well as at the 2013 CONCACAF Gold Cup.

== Honours ==
Panama

- CONCACAF Gold Cup runner-up: 2013
