= Cristian Álvarez =

Cristian Álvarez may refer to:

- Cristian Álvarez (musician) (born 1972), Argentine rock musician known as Pity
- Cristian Álvarez (Salvadoran footballer) (born 1978), Salvadoran footballer
- Cristian Álvarez (footballer, born January 1978), Argentine football defender/midfielder
- Cristián Álvarez (footballer, born 1980), Chilean football defender
- Cristian Álvarez (footballer, born 1983), Guatemalan football goalkeeper
- Cristian Álvarez (footballer, born 1985), Argentine football goalkeeper
- Cristián Álvarez (footballer, born 1992), Argentine football midfielder
