= Ariel Rodríguez (footballer, born 1986) =

Costa Rican footballer

Personal information
- Full name: Eithel Ariel Rodríguez Araya
- Date of birth: 22 April 1986 (age 40)
- Height: 1.82 m (5 ft 11 1/2 in)
- Position: Midfielder

Team information
- Current team: Alajuelense
- Number: 26

Senior career*
Years	Team	Apps	(Gls)
2004–2010	Alajuelense		
2010–2013	Pérez Zeledón		
2013–	Alajuelense		

International career^{‡}
2013–	Costa Rica	16	(0)
- * Club domestic league appearances and goals as of 17:55, 13 May 2014 (UTC) ‡ National team caps and goals as of 17:55, 13 May 2014 (UTC)

Eithel Ariel Rodríguez Araya (born 22 April 1986) is a Costa Rican international footballer who plays as a midfielder.

== Career ==
=== Club ===
Rodríguez made his debut for Alajuelense in 2004 and joined Pérez Zeledón in 2010, only to return to Liga in 2013.

=== International ===
He made his international debut for Costa Rica in a January 2013 Copa Centroamericana match against Belize , and was called up to the provisional squad at the 2014 FIFA World Cup.
