= Charles Tillett =

Belizean association football player (born 2001)

Personal information
- Date of birth: 29 July 2001 (age 25)
- Place of birth: Orange Walk Town, Belize
- Position: Goalkeeper

Team information
- Current team: Progresso

Senior career*
| Years | Team | Apps | (Gls) |
| 2018–2019 | Belize Defence Force | | |
| 2019–2020 | Belmopan Bandits | | |
| 2020–2023 | Verdes | | |
| 2023– | Progresso | | |

International career^{‡}
| 2021– | Belize | 23 | (0) |
- * Club domestic league appearances and goals as of 00:15 (UTC) 18 September 2024 ‡ National team caps and goals as of 23 March 2025

Charles Tillett (born 29 July 2001) is a Belizean professional footballer who plays as a goalkeeper for Progresso in the Premier League of Belize as well the Belize national football team.

== Club career ==
He won the Premier League of Belize with Port Layola in May 2024. Ahead of the 2024–25 season he signed for Progresso in the Premier League of Belize.

== International career ==
He made his debut for the Belize national football team against Nicaragua in a CONCACAF World Cup qualifier on 5 June 2021.

In November 2023, he was voted into the CONCACAF Best-XI for his performances for the Belize national team in that international window.

== Career statistics ==
=== International ===
As of match played 21 March 2025

Appearances and goals by national team and year
| National team | Year | Apps | Goals |
|---|---|---|---|
Belize
| Belize | 2021 | 1 | 0 |
| Belize | 2022 | 5 | 0 |
| Belize | 2023 | 8 | 0 |
| Belize | 2024 | 8 | 0 |
| Belize | 2025 | 1 | 0 |
| Total | | 23 | 0 |
