= Medard (name) =

Medard or Médard is a French masculine given name, which is a form of the name Medardus, derived from Mahtahard, meaning "brave" or "hardy". The French variant is Medárd and the Italian variant is Medardo.

It is also a surname.

The name may refer to:

== Given name ==
- Medardus or Medard (c. 456–545), French Catholic saint and Bishop of Noyon
- Médard Albrand (1898–1981), French politician
- Médard Autsai Asenga (born 1942), politician in the Democratic Republic of the Congo
- Medard Boss (1903–1990), Swiss psychiatrist
- Médard des Groseilliers (1618–?), French explorer and fur trader in what is now Canada
- Medard Gabel (born 1946), American writer
- Medard Kalemani (born 1968), Tanzanian politician and lawyer, former Minister of Energy
- Médard Makanga (born 1967), Congolese sprinter
- Medard Mulangala (born 1957), Congo politician
- Médard Léopold Ouédraogo (born 1953), Burkinabe Catholic prelate and bishop
- Médard Tytgat (1871–1948), Belgian artist
- Medard Welch (1892–1980), American scientist

== Surname ==
- Louis Médard (1768–1841), French merchant and book collector
- Marie Médard (1921–2013), member of the French Resistance during the Second World War and librarian
- Maxime Médard (born 1986), French former rugby union player
- Muriel Médard (born 1968), American information theorist and electrical engineer
- Philippe Médard (1959–2017), French handball player
- Yahaya Médard (born 2000), French footballer

== See also ==
- Joseph-Médard Émard (1853–1927), Canadian archbishop
- Pierre-Médard Diard (1794–1863), French naturalist and explorer
