= Brayan Beckeles =

Honduran football player (born 1985)

Personal information
- Full name: Brayan Antonio Beckeles
- Date of birth: 28 November 1985 (age 40)
- Place of birth: La Ceiba, Honduras
- Height: 1.86 m (6 ft 1 in)
- Position: Right back

Team information
- Current team: Leones HT6
- Number: 6

Youth career
- Vida

Senior career*
Years	Team	Apps	(Gls)
2006–2011	Vida	94	(1)
2011–2014	Olimpia	103	(5)
2014–2015	Boavista	26	(0)
2015–2019	Necaxa	108	(2)
2019–2020	Olimpia	9	(2)
2020	Nashville SC	2	(0)
2021–2024	Olimpia	79	(1)
2024–2025	Victoria	18	(0)
2025–	Leones HT6	0	(0)

International career^{‡}
2010–2019	Honduras	66	(1)
- * Club domestic league appearances and goals as of 17 May 2025 ‡ National team caps and goals as of 18 June 2019

Brayan Antonio Beckeles (born 28 November 1985) is a Honduran professional footballer who plays as a right-back for Leones HT6.

== Club career ==
=== Early life ===
Beckeles started his career at hometown club Vida for whom he would make his professional debut and whom he would captain. He then joined giants Olimpia in 2011.

=== Olimpia ===
Beckeles made his official debut for the club on 27 July 2011 during the CONCACAF Champions League preliminary round against Santos Laguna in a 3–1 defeat where he scored the only goal for the club.

=== Nashville SC ===
On 4 December 2019, it was announced that Beckeles would join Nashville SC ahead of their inaugural MLS season in 2020.

== International career ==
He made his debut for Honduras in a September 2010 friendly match against Canada. On 26 January 2013, Beckeles scored his first ever goal for the national team in his 11th game, playing at the semi-finals of the 2013 Copa Centroamericana versus Belize. The goal proved to be a crucial one, as Honduras won 1–0 to progress to the final. He has represented his country at the 2011 CONCACAF Gold Cup. On 7 June 2014, he was sent off for two bookable offences in a World Cup warm-up match against England in Miami.

=== International goals ===
Scores and results list Honduras' goal tally first.

N.	Date	Venue	Opponent	Score	Result	Competition
1.	25 January 2013	Estadio Nacional, San José, Costa Rica	Belize	1–0	1–0	2013 Copa Centroamericana

== Honours ==
=== Club ===
Necaxa

- Ascenso MX: 2015–16
- Copa MX: Clausura 2018
- Supercopa MX: 2018
