= Jairo Arrieta =

Costa Rican footballer (born 1983)

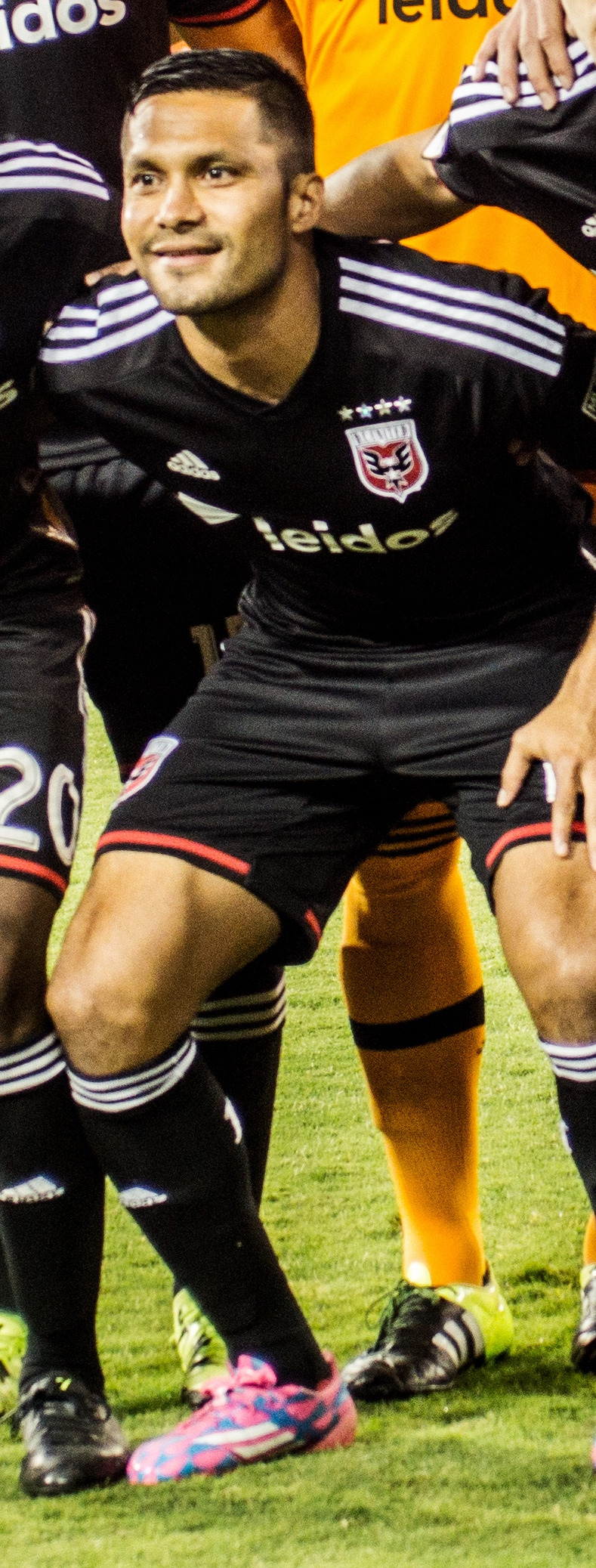
- Arrieta with D.C. United in 2015

Personal information
- Full name: Jairo Arrieta Obando
- Date of birth: 25 August 1983 (age 43)
- Place of birth: Nicoya, Costa Rica
- Height: 1.73 m (5 ft 8 in)
- Position: Forward

Team information
- Current team: Jicaral
- Number: 19

Senior career*
Years	Team	Apps	(Gls)
2003–2004	Guanacasteca	60	(12)
2004–2006	Brujas	56	(11)
2006–2012	Saprissa	178	(48)
2012–2014	Columbus Crew	67	(17)
2015	D.C. United	27	(5)
2016	New York Cosmos	28	(7)
2016–2018	Herediano	73	(24)
2018–2019	Saprissa	35	(9)
2019	San Carlos	19	(6)
2020	Siquinalá	12	(5)
2021	Consultants	16	(9)
2021–2022	Jicaral	28	(7)
2022	Grecia	13	(4)
2023–	Jicaral	0	(0)

International career^{‡}
2004	Costa Rica U23	6	(2)
2011–	Costa Rica	17	(4)
- * Club domestic league appearances and goals as of 13:36, 9 May 2020 (UTC) ‡ National team caps and goals as of 11 June 2015

Jairo Arrieta Obando (born 25 August 1983) is a Costa Rican professional footballer, who plays as a forward for A.D.R. Jicaral.

== Club career ==
=== Costa Rica ===
Arrieta was born in Nicoya, Costa Rica. Before moving to Deportivo Saprissa, he played for Guanacasteca and their successors Brujas. While with Saprissa, Arrieta scored 48 goals in 178 league matches. He also played an important part in Saprissa's Costa Rican league titles in 2006–07, 2007-08 Apertura, 2007-08 Clausura, 2008-09 Apertura, and 2010 Clausura.

=== Columbus Crew ===
In April 2012, Arrieta signed a 2 1/2-year agreement with Columbus Crew, moving to play outside of Costa Rica for the first time in his career. Arrieta made his MLS debut for the Crew on 14 July 2012, playing 62 minutes in a loss to Sporting Kansas City at home. This came just 17 days after 27 June transfer window opened. Two weeks later, in a rematch at Kansas City, Arrieta scored his first MLS goal in the 17th minute of the match, following with the game winner in the 34th minute. After only his third game in MLS, Arrieta was named League Player of the Week with a 2-goal performance in a Columbus win against Sporting Kansas City.

=== D.C. United ===
Orlando City SC selected Arrieta in the 6th round of the 2014 MLS Expansion Draft. He was later traded to D.C. United ahead of the 2015 season in exchange for an international roster spot. In his debut for D.C. United, he scored in the 58th minute to secure a 1–0 win against the Montreal Impact. Arrieta's option for the 2016 season was declined by D.C. United.

He scored 5 goals and recorded 2 assists in his 27 appearances for D.C.

=== New York Cosmos ===
Arrieta signed with New York Cosmos of the North American Soccer League on January 14, 2016.

== International career ==
Arrieta played with the Costa Rica under-23 team at the 2004 Summer Olympics.

He made his senior debut for Costa Rica in a December 2011 friendly match against Cuba and has, as of January 2014, earned a total of 15 caps, scoring 4 goals. He has represented his country in 1 FIFA World Cup qualification match and played at the 2013 Copa Centroamericana. His two goals in the tournament, his first two for his country, were enough to earn him the Golden Boot award as the tournament's top scorer. Because of his performance at the Copa Centroamericana, Arrieta was called up by Costa Rica for their World Cup qualifying match against Panama on 6 February 2013.

He also played at the 2013 CONCACAF Gold Cup.

=== International goals ===
Scores and results list Costa Rica's goal tally first.

Goal	Date	Venue	Opponent	Score	Result	Competition
1.	18 January 2013	Estadio Nacional, San José, Costa Rica	Belize	1–0	1–0	2013 Copa Centroamericana
2.	22 January 2013	Estadio Nacional, San José, Costa Rica	Guatemala	1–0	1–1	2013 Copa Centroamericana
3.	28 March 2013	Commonwealth Stadium, Edmonton, Canada	Canada	1–0	1–0	Friendly
4.	9 July 2013	Jeld-Wen Field, Portland, United States	Cuba	2–0	3–0	2013 CONCACAF Gold Cup

== Personal life ==
Arrieta holds a U.S. green card which qualifies him as a domestic player for MLS roster purposes.

== Honors ==
=== Individual ===
- Golden Boot Winner – 2013 Copa Centroamericana
