= Máximo Gámez =

Nicaraguan footballer

Máximo Arturo Gámez
Personal information
- Full name: Máximo Arturo Gámez González
- Date of birth: 28 November 1989 (age 36)
- Place of birth: Ocotal, Nicaragua
- Height: 1.78 m (5 ft 10 in)
- Position: Defender

Team information
- Current team: Managua
- Number: 5

Senior career*
Years	Team	Apps	(Gls)
2008–2011	Deportivo Ocotal		
2012–	Managua		

International career^{‡}
2011–	Nicaragua	9	(0)
- * Club domestic league appearances and goals as of 00:59, 22 February 2012 (UTC) ‡ National team caps and goals as of 19 December 2013

Máximo Arturo Gámez González (born November 28, 1989) is a Nicaraguan professional defender currently playing for Managua.

== Club career ==
Gámez was signed by Deportivo Ocotal in summer 2008, then joined Managua in January 2012.

== International career ==
Gámez made his debut for Nicaragua in a September 2011 FIFA World Cup qualification match against Dominica and has, as of December 2013, earned a total of 9 caps, scoring no goals. He has represented his country in 4 FIFA World Cup qualification matches and played at the 2013 Copa Centroamericana.
