= Leroy Lewis (footballer) =

Costa Rican footballer and coach (1945–2021)

Personal information
- Full name: Leroy Delano Sherrier Lewis
- Date of birth: 29 May 1945
- Place of birth: Limón, Costa Rica
- Date of death: 13 September 2021 (aged 76)
- Place of death: Limón, Costa Rica

Senior career*
Years	Team	Apps	(Gls)
1964–1970	Limonense		
1971–1977	Uruguay de Coronado		

Managerial career
- 1980–1982: Limonense
- 1983–1985: Sagrada Familia
- 1986–1987: Municipal Puntarenas
- 1987–1988: Alajuelense
- 1990–1993: Uruguay de Coronado
- 2001: Belize
- 2002–2003: Guanacasteca
- 2012–2013: Belize
- 2014: Belmopan Bandits
- 2014–2015: Belize
- * Club domestic league appearances and goals

Leroy Sherrier Lewis (29 May 1945 – 13 September 2021) was a Costa Rican football player and coach.

In his native country, he led his hometown team Limonense to their best performance in the top flight league, finishing as runners-up. He also found success in Belize, where he led the Belize national team to their best result at the Copa Centroamericana, finishing four at the 2013 edition, thus qualifying to the 2013 CONCACAF Gold Cup, Belize's only participation at such tournament so far.

== Playing career ==
As a player, he played in his native Costa Rica with AD Limonese and Uruguay de Coronado.

== Coaching career ==
Lewis coached teams in Costa Rica and Belize, winning the national championships in Costa Rica and Belize with Guanacasteca (Segunda División de Costa Rica) and Belmopan Bandits (Belize Premier Football League) respectively. He also coached Belize national team on three occasions.

== Death ==
Lewis died on 13 September 2021 at his home after battling with prostate cancer.
