= Denis Pineda =

Salvadoran footballer (born 1995)

Personal information
- Full name: Denis Omar Pineda Torres
- Date of birth: 10 August 1995 (age 31)
- Place of birth: Verapaz, San Vicente, El Salvador
- Height: 1.79 m (5 ft 10 in)
- Position: Winger

Team information
- Current team: Rabo de Peixe

Youth career
- Turín FESA

Senior career*
Years	Team	Apps	(Gls)
2014–2017	UANL Premier	28	(6)
2016–2017	→ Santa Clara (loan)	33	(3)
2017–2020	Santa Clara	50	(1)
2019–2020	→ Estoril (loan)	4	(0)
2020–2021	Técnico Universitario	11	(2)
2021–2022	FAS	16	(1)
2022	Chalatenango	23	(5)
2022–2023	FAS	12	(0)
2023	Águila	17	(1)
2023–2024	Rabo de Peixe		
2025–	Inter Detroit FC	0	(0)

International career^{‡}
2014	El Salvador U20		
2014–	El Salvador	32	(3)
- * Club domestic league appearances and goals as of 6 August 2023 ‡ National team caps and goals as of 6 August 2023

Denis Pineda (born 10 August 1995) is a Salvadoran professional footballer who plays as a winger for Midwest Premier League club Inter Detroit FC and the El Salvador national team.

== Club career ==
On 27 June 2016, it was announced that Pineda would sign to a one-year loan to Portuguese second division club Santa Clara. On 30 July 2016, Pineda made his debut with Santa Clara in a 2016–17 Taça da Liga match against Portimonense S.C.. He scored his first goal against Académica de Coimbra on 14 August 2016

== Career statistics ==
=== International ===
As of match played 7 June 2022

Appearances and goals by national team and year
National team	Year	Apps	Goals
El Salvador	2014	3	0
El Salvador	2015	2	0
El Salvador	2016	5	0
El Salvador	2017	8	2
El Salvador	2018	6	1
El Salvador	2019	3	0
El Salvador	2020	1	0
El Salvador	2021	2	0
El Salvador	2022	2	0
Total		32	3

Scores and results list El Salvador's goal tally first, score column indicates score after each Pineda goal.

List of international goals scored by Denis Pineda
No.	Date	Venue	Opponent	Score	Result	Competition
1	27 May 2017	RFK Stadium, Washington D.C., United States	Honduras	1–2	2–2	Friendly
2	8 October 2017	BBVA Compass Stadium, Houston, United States	Canada	1–0	1–0	Friendly
3	2 June 2018	BBVA Compass Stadium, Houston, United States	Honduras	1–0	1–0	Friendly
