= Gerardo Arias =

Guatemalan footballer (born 1985)

Personal information
- Full name: Gerardo Alberto Arias Gaytán
- Date of birth: 24 September 1985 (age 41)
- Place of birth: Escuintla, Guatemala
- Height: 1.74 m (5 ft 8 1/2 in)
- Position: Defensive midfielder

Senior career*
Years	Team	Apps	(Gls)
2010	Coatepeque	0	(0)
2010–2011	San Pedro	0	(0)
2011–2013	Halcones	80	(14)
2013–2014	Suchitepéquez	40	(3)
2014–2015	Petapa	37	(2)
2015-2017	Municipal	50	(0)
2017-2018	Guastatoya	63	(2)
2018-2019	Cobán Imperial	34	(0)
2019-2021	Xelajú	45	(1)
2021	Achuapa	12	(0)
2021-2022	Sololá FC	6	(0)

International career
2014-2021	Guatemala	10	(0)
- * Club domestic league appearances and goals as of 1 January 2022

Gerardo Arias (born 18 November 1985) is a Guatemalan professional footballer who plays as a Defensive Midfielder.

He made his debut for the national Guatemalan team against Peru on 15 October 2014.
