= Cristhian Lagos =

Costa Rican footballer (born 1984)

Cristhian Lagos CL9
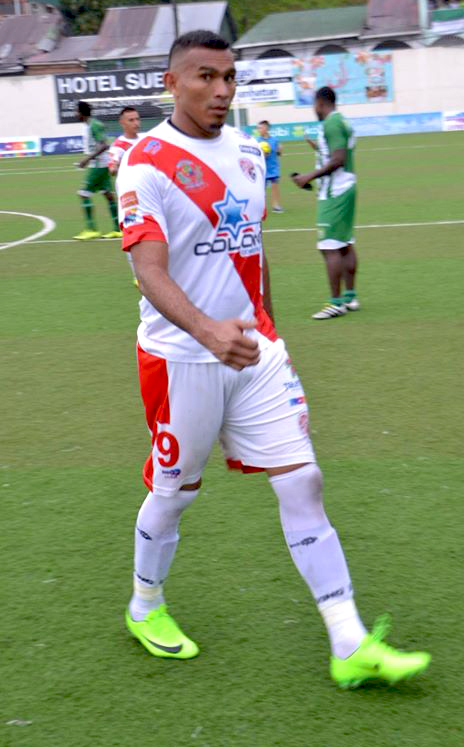
- Lagos playing for Santos

Personal information
- Full name: Cristhian Lagos Navarro
- Date of birth: 17 August 1984 (age 42)
- Place of birth: Concepción, Tres Ríos o Alajuelita, Costa Rica
- Height: 1.87 m (6 ft 2 in)

Team information
- Current team: A.D. CARMELITA

Senior career*
Years	Team	Apps	(Gls)
2008–2020	Turrialba		(36)
2010	Brujas	24	(9)
2011	→ Alajuelense (loan)	15	(1)
2012	Santos de Guápiles	42	(28)
2013	Saprissa	18	(5)
2013	→ Santos de Guápiles (loan)	21	(13)
2014	Churchill Brothers	5	(2)
2014	Santos de Guápiles	16	(4)
2015–2017	Herediano	35	(12)
2016	→ Xelajú (loan)	18	(8)
2016–2017	→ Santos de Guápiles (loan)	31	(10)
2017–2019	Santos de Guápiles	43	(8)
2019–2020	Jicaral	20	(4)
2021	Sporting San Jose	4	(4)
2021	A.D. Carmelita	8	(4)

International career
2012–2013	Costa Rica	2	(1)
- * Club domestic league appearances and goals as of 3 February 2021 (UTC)

Cristhian Lagos Navarro (born 17 August 1984) is a Costa Rican professional footballer for A.D. Carmelita.

== Club career ==
=== Early years ===
Born in Puntarenas Province, Lagos' parents decided to move to Limón where Cristhian went to school and worked in banana plantations. Only at 22 years of age he was offered the possibility to join second division side Turrialba. Lagos subsequently started his professional career at Turrialba before moving to Brujas in 2010. He joined Alajuelense on loan in February 2011

=== Deportivo Saprissa ===
On 14 December 2012 Lagos signed with Saprissa. He made his debut in a 2–1 loss against San Carlos. On 10 February Lagos scored his first goal with the club in a 2–2 tie against Puntarenas. In August 2013 he returned to Santos.

=== Churchill Brothers ===
On 27 December 2013 it was announced that Lagos had signed for Churchill Brothers of the I-League. On 11 March 2014, Lagos scored brace in AFC Cup match against Maldives side New Radiant SC in which Churchill Brothers won 3–0.

=== Back to Costa Rica ===
In June 2014 he returned to Santos de Guápiles, claiming the Indian side broke his contract by only paying him one month wages. He played for the club until the summer 2019, where he joined A.D.R. Jicaral. In 2020, he returned to his first club, Turrialba.

== International career ==
A tall striker, Lagos was called for the Costa Rica national team in October for the World Cup Qualifiers against El Salvador and Guyana but did not appear in either of the two matches. Lagos made his debut in a 1–1 draw against Bolivia on 14 November 2012. Lagos scored his first goal with the national team in a 2–0 victory against Nicaragua in the Copa Centroamericana.

Scores and results list Costa Rica's goal tally first.

Goal	Date	Venue	Opponent	Score	Result	Competition	Ref.
1.	20 January 2013	Estadio Nacional, San José, Costa Rica	Nicaragua	1–0	2–0	2013 Copa Centroamericana	
