= Donald Parrales =

Nicaraguan footballer

Personal information
- Full name: Donald José Parrales Valverde
- Date of birth: March 5, 1983 (age 43)
- Place of birth: Carazo Department, Nicaragua
- Position: Defender

Team information
- Current team: Walter Ferretti
- Number: 20

Senior career*
Years	Team	Apps	(Gls)
2003–2007	Masatepe		
2007–2011	Diriangén		
2011–present	Walter Ferretti		

International career^{‡}
2011–	Nicaragua	9	(0)
- * Club domestic league appearances and goals as of 00:56, 22 February 2012 (UTC) ‡ National team caps and goals as of 5 January 2014

Donald José Parrales Valverde (born 5 March 1983) is a Nicaraguan professional defender currently playing for Deportivo Walter Ferretti.

== Club career ==
He started his career at Masatepe before joining Diriangén. He then decided to move to Walter Ferretti in 2011.

== International career ==
Parrales made his debut for Nicaragua in a May 2011 friendly match against Cuba and has, as of December 2013, earned a total of 9 caps, scoring no goals. He has represented his country in 3 FIFA World Cup qualification matches and played at the 2013 Copa Centroamericana.
