= Luis Contreras (footballer) =

Salvadoran footballer (born 1982)

Personal information
- Full name: Luis Edgardo Contreras Reyes
- Date of birth: 27 October 1982 (age 44)
- Place of birth: La Unión, El Salvador
- Height: 1.75 m (5 ft 9 in)
- Position: Goalkeeper

Senior career*
Years	Team	Apps	(Gls)
2002–2008	FAS		
2008–2009	Águila	15	(0)
2009–2016	FAS	177+ (Note: Statistics included only from 2011 to 2016.)	(0+)
2017	Sonsonate	13	(0)
2018	Chalatenango	9	(0)
2018–2020	Isidro Metapán	21	(0)

International career
2014–2016	El Salvador	6	(0)
- * Club domestic league appearances and goals

Luis Edgardo Contreras Reyes (born 27 October 1982) is a Salvadoran former professional footballer who played as a goalkeeper. He made six appearances for the El Salvador national team from 2014 to 2016.

== Club career ==
Nicknamed El Motor, Contreras played his entire career in El Salvador. He played for FAS (two spells), Águila, Sonsonate, Chalatenango, and Isidro Metapán. In April 2020, he was released from Isidro Metapán.

== International career ==
Contreras made his debut for the El Salvador national team in 2014, and was selected for the 2015 CONCACAF Gold Cup squad. He made a total of six appearances for his home country.

== Honours ==
FAS

- Primera División de Fútbol de El Salvador: Clausura 2002, Apertura 2002, Apertura 2003, Apertura 2004, Clausura 2004, Apertura 2009
