= Elvis Pinel =

Nicaraguan professional midfielder (born 1988)

Personal information
- Full name: Elvis Ángel Figueroa Pinel
- Date of birth: December 18, 1988 (age 37)
- Place of birth: Ocotal, Nicaragua
- Position: Midfielder

Team information
- Current team: Real Estelí
- Number: 16

Senior career*
Years	Team	Apps	(Gls)
2010–2011	Managua		
2011–	Real Estelí	74	(8)

International career^{‡}
2011–	Nicaragua	30	(1)
- * Club domestic league appearances and goals as of 02:24, 23 February 2012 (UTC) ‡ National team caps and goals as of 9 July 2017 (UTC)

Elvis Ángel Figueroa Pinel (born 18 December 1988) is a Nicaraguan professional midfielder currently playing for Real Estelí.

== International career ==
Figueroa made his debut for Nicaragua in a January 2011 Copa Centroamericana match against El Salvador and has, as of July 2017, earned a total of 30 caps, scoring 1 goal. He has represented his country in 2 FIFA World Cup qualification matches and played at the 2011 and 2013 Copa Centroamericana.

=== International goals ===
Scores and results list Honduras' goal tally first.

N.	Date	Venue	Opponent	Score	Result	Competition
1.	22 January 2013	Estadio Nacional de Costa Rica, San José, Costa Rica	Belize	1–1	1–2	2013 Copa Centroamericana
