= Roaring Creek, Belize =

Roaring Creek
- Location within Belize
- Coordinates: 17°16′N 88°48′W
- Country: Belize
- District: Cayo District
- Constituency: Cayo South

Population (6000)
  - Total: Under 6,000 (est)
- Time zone: UTC-6 (Central)

Roaring Creek is a small village in the Cayo District of Belize, just north-west of Belmopan. Its name is derived from the creek waterfalls which flow into the Belize River next to the Guanacaste Park area.

Roaring Creek has a population of less than 2000 people, which includes Central American immigrants, Kriols and Mopan Maya. Creole is the main language used in the village.

The village hosts two primary schools, the Roman Catholic and the Nazarene, and two elementary schools.

Roaring Creek is home to Belize Bird Rescue, the country's only Avian Rescue and Rehabilitation centre which has been operating under an MOU from the government of Belize since 2004.

The first Christian radio station in Belize is also here, "My Refuge Christian Radio Station".

There are thirteen churches in Roaring Creek and several church-based organizations such as Youth With A Mission Belize (YWAM). It is also home to a Christian school sponsorship program called Hearts of Christ children's ministry.

Roaring Creek United represents the village in football.

== Demographics ==
At the time of the 2010 census, Roaring Creek had a population of 1,974. Of these, 54.1% were Creole, 17.1% Mestizo, 16.0% Mixed, 5.5% Mopan Maya, 2.7% East Indian, 2.1% Garifuna, 0.9% Ketchi Maya, 0.8% Caucasian, 0.3% Asian, 0.2% African, 0.2% Mennonite and 0.1% Lebanese.
