= Medardo Martínez =

Nicaraguan footballer

Personal information
- Full name: Medardo Antonio Martínez Morales
- Date of birth: October 20, 1988 (age 38)
- Place of birth: Jinotepe, Nicaragua
- Position: Midfielder

Team information
- Current team: Managua
- Number: 10

Senior career*
Years	Team	Apps	(Gls)
2007–2009	Xilotepelt		
2009–2012	Walter Ferretti		
2012–	Managua		

International career
2011–	Nicaragua	6	(0)
- * Club domestic league appearances and goals

Medardo Antonio Martínez Morales (born October 20, 1988) is a Nicaraguan footballer who currently plays in midfield for Managua.

== Club career ==
He started his career at hometown club Xilotepelt before moving to Walter Ferretti. He joined Managua in summer 2012.

== International career ==
Martínez made his debut for Nicaragua in a November 2011 FIFA World Cup qualification match against Dominica and has, as of December 2013, earned a total of 6 caps, scoring no goals. He has represented his country in 1 FIFA World Cup qualification match and played at the 2013 Copa Centroamericana
