= Medardo Geslani =

Filipino brigadier general

Medardo Pareja Geslani is a Filipino brigadier general, promoted in 2014.

== Career ==
Geslani, who graduated at the Philippine Military Academy (PMA) in 1982, has received numerous recognitions for his service. Among the recognition was the one in 1998 as one of the 10 most outstanding soldiers. Prior to the appointment as brigadier general, he was the deputy commander of the Training and Doctrine Command.

He gained some media attention for having been blamed not granting Esmael Mangudadatu's relatives protection for the convoy to file certificate of candidacy in Maguindanao for the 2010 Philippine general election. At the time, he was then Colonel, Commander of the 601st Infantry Brigade, 6th Infantry Division that operated in several areas in Central Mindanao.

After his refusal granting the protection request, the Maguindanao massacre happened. Despite the refusal to grant the protection and the media criticism, Geslani was cleared of any responsibility.

In 2014, the Commission on Appointments promoted Geslani to the rank of brigadier general. The National Union of Journalists of the Philippines criticized Geslani's appointment as brigadier general.

In 2024, the Supreme Court of the Philippines upheld the dismissal of his cases.
