= Cristian Álvarez (footballer, born 1983) =

Guatemalan footballer

Personal information
- Date of birth: May 21, 1983 (age 43)
- Height: 1.85 m (6 ft 1 in)
- Position: Goalkeeper

Team information
- Current team: Municipal

Senior career*
Years	Team	Apps	(Gls)
2005–2009	Comunicaciones		
2009–2010	Malacateco		
2010–2011	Retalteca		
2011–	Municipal		

International career
2010–	Guatemala	6	(0)
- * Club domestic league appearances and goals

Cristian Álvarez (born May 21, 1983) is a Guatemalan professional footballer who plays as a goalkeeper for Municipal.
