= Enrique Llena =

Spanish football manager (born 1961)

Quique Llena
Personal information
- Full name: Enrique Llena León
- Date of birth: 6 November 1961 (age 64)
- Place of birth: Barbastro, Spain
- Position: Goalkeeper

Youth career
- Boscos Salesianos

Senior career*
Years	Team	Apps	(Gls)
1981–1982	Benabarre		
1982–198X	Estadilla		
- Aínsa
- Zaidín
- Tamarite

Managerial career
- Alcampell
- Binéfar (youth)
- Estadilla
- Binaced
- Atlético Monzón
- 1998–1999: Huesca
- 2006: Binéfar
- 2006–2007: Atlético Monzón
- 2010–2014: Nicaragua
- 2010–2014: Nicaragua U20
- * Club domestic league appearances and goals

Enrique "Quique" Llena León (born 6 November 1961) is a Spanish retired football manager and player. He played as a goalkeeper.

== Career ==
Born in Barbastro, Huesca, Aragón, Llena played youth football for CD Boscos Salesianos. He never left his native region as a senior, representing UD Benabarre, CD Estadilla (where he helped the side to achieve two consecutive promotions, the latter one to Tercera División), Aínsa CD, CD Zaidín and CDJ Tamarite, among other clubs.

After retiring, Llena started working as a manager, with his first side being UD Alcampell. Still in his native Aragon, he worked with the Cadete squad of CD Binéfar, Estadilla and UD Binaced before being appointed in charge of Atlético Monzón in the fourth division.

Llena was also manager of SD Huesca during the 1998–99 campaign, with the club also in division four. In January 2010, he was appointed to be the manager of the Nicaragua national football team.

Llena was sacked from the national team on 8 November 2014, after failing to qualify for the 2015 CONCACAF Gold Cup.
