= José Manuel Contreras =

Guatemalan footballer (born 1986)

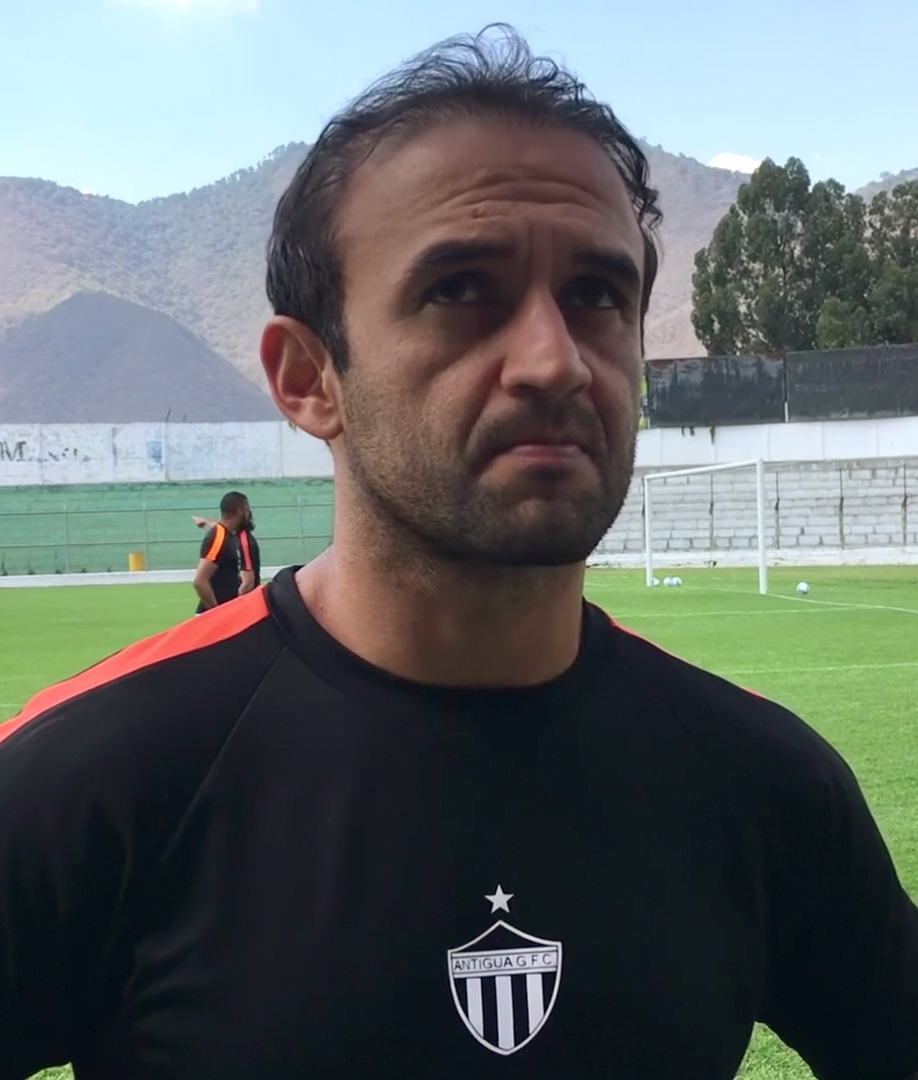
- Contreras with Antigua in 2017

Personal information
- Full name: José Manuel Contreras
- Date of birth: 19 January 1986 (age 40)
- Place of birth: Atescatempa, Guatemala
- Height: 1.74 m (5 ft 9 in)
- Position: Midfielder

Youth career
- 1999–2000: USAC
- 2000–2003: Comunicaciones

Senior career*
Years	Team	Apps	(Gls)
2004–2009	Comunicaciones	73	(6)
2008–2009	→ Arsenal de Sarandí (loan)	6	(0)
2009	Fénix	1	(0)
2010	Xelajú	23	(4)
2010–2011	Comunicaciones	52	(8)
2011–2012	Universidad de Concepción	23	(2)
2012–2017	Comunicaciones	133	(39)
2017–2019	Antigua	102	(5)
2020–2026	Comunicaciones	175	(13)

International career
2008	Guatemala U23	4	(0)
2006–2021	Guatemala	80	(5)
- * Club domestic league appearances and goals as of 20:00, 20 July 2025 (UTC)

José Manuel Contreras (Spanish pronunciation: [xosˈe manwˈel kontɾˈeɾas]; born 19 January 1986), nicknamed El Moyo, is a Guatemalan former professional footballer who played as a midfielder.

Contreras has also played for clubs Arsenal de Sarandí in Argentina and C.D. Universidad de Concepción in Chile, among other clubs, and it's said to be the promise of Guatemalan football.

== Club career ==
=== Comunicaciones ===
As a youth player, Contreras was with USAC before joining the Comunicaciones youth system.

==== 2003–04: Loan to Achuapa ====
Having begun his career with Comunicaciones in the Guatemalan top division, Contreras briefly played in the Primera División de Ascenso (second level) with Achuapa, and then returned to Comunicaciones.

==== 2008–09: Loan to Arsenal de Sarandí ====
In July 2008, when he joined Arsenal de Sarandí. He made his debut for Arsenal on 27 August 2008, against Boca Juniors for the second leg of the Recopa Sudamericana, a match that ended 2–2 (3–5 aggregate in favor of Boca Juniors). Contreras came in at the beginning of the second half in substitution of Luciano Leguizamón, who left the pitch injured at the end of the first half.

=== Fénix ===
In July 2009 it was rumored that Contreras would join Gimnasia de Jujuy of the Argentine 2nd division, but then a move to Uruguayan side CA Fénix at the end of August 2009 was announced.

=== Xelajú ===
On 28 December 2009 he returned to Guatemala and signed with Xelajú.

=== Return to Comunicaciones ===
In June 2010 Contreras rejoined the club where he started his career, Comunicaciones., playing there for the entirety of the 2010–2011 season.

=== Universidad de Concepción ===
One year later, in June 2011, he was signed by C.D. Universidad de Concepción, and in August 2011 he made his debut scoring the third goal of his team's 3–0 win over Colo-Colo.

=== Return to Comunicaciones ===
==== 2025–26: Final season ====
On 27 May 2025, shortly after renewing his contract with the club, Contreras announced that the upcoming 2025 Apertura would be his final season with Comunicaciones and will retire.

== International career ==
=== Youth ===
In 2008, Contreras played for the U-23 national team of Guatemala in the qualification rounds to the 2008 Olympic tournament, where he led the team to a 1–0 victory against Haiti and an upsetting 2–1 victory against Mexico. The Guatemalan team ended the group stage in first place earning a semifinal berth against Honduras in which they came short of qualifying, losing 6–5 on penalty kicks. After his performances throughout the tournament, he was named one of the "eleven best" in the tournament alongside teammate Carlos Castrillo.

=== Senior ===
Contreras' debut match for the Guatemala senior side was against Haiti in August 2006, where he made an assist to Mario Rodríguez in a 1–1 draw. He scored his first international goal in the match versus El Salvador in the 2007 CONCACAF Gold Cup.

== Career statistics ==
=== International goals ===
Scores and results list. Guatemala's goal tally first.

#	Date	Venue	Opponent	Score	Result	Competition
1	9 June 2007	Home Depot Center, Carson, California, USA	El Salvador	1–0	1–0	2007 CONCACAF Gold Cup
2	10 September 2008	Estadio Mateo Flores, Guatemala City, Guatemala	Cuba	4–1	4–1	2010 FIFA World Cup qualification
3	22 January 2013	Estadio Nacional, San José, Costa Rica	Costa Rica	1–1	1–1	2013 Copa Centroamericana
4	6 February 2013	Sun Life Stadium, Miami Gardens, USA	Colombia	1–3	1–4	Friendly
5	14 August 2014	Estadio Pensativo, Antigua Guatemala, Guatemala	Nicaragua	1–0	3–0	Friendly

== Honours ==
Comunicaciones

- Liga Guate: Clausura 2011, Apertura 2011, Clausura 2013, Apertura 2013, Clausura 2014, Apertura 2014, 2015 Clausura, 2022 Clausura, 2023 Apertura
- CONCACAF League: 2021

Antigua

- Liga Guate: Apertura 2017, Clausura 2019
