= Daniel Cambronero =

Costa Rican footballer (born 1986)

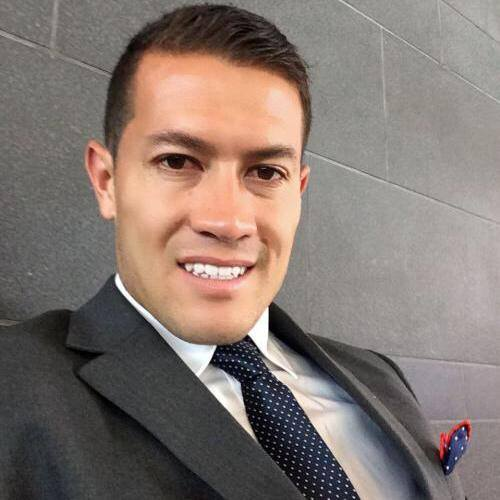

Personal information
- Full name: Daniel Arturo Cambronero Solano
- Date of birth: January 8, 1986 (age 40)
- Place of birth: San José, Costa Rica
- Height: 1.83 m (6 ft 0 in)
- Position: Goalkeeper

Youth career
- Deportivo Saprissa

Senior career*
Years	Team	Apps	(Gls)
2003–2007	Saprissa		(0)
2007–2009	Puntarenas	26	(0)
2009–2010	UCR	51	(0)
2011–2019	Herediano	148	(0)
2019	Malacateco	21	(0)
2020	La U Universitarios	18	(0)
2020–2023	Santos	28	(0)
2023	Grecia	2	(0)
2023–2024	Fútbol Consultants	0	(0)
2025–	Municipal Puntarenas	0	(0)

International career
2001	Costa Rica U20		(0)
2004	Costa Rica U23		(0)
2009–2014	Costa Rica	4	(0)
- * Club domestic league appearances and goals

Daniel Arturo Cambronero Solano (born January 8, 1986) is a Costa Rican footballer who plays as a goalkeeper for Municipal Puntarenas.

== Club career ==
After coming through the youth ranks at Saprissa, Cambronero made his professional debut for Puntarenas. He moved to UCR in 2007 and joined Herediano in 2011.

== International career ==
Cambornero made his debut for Costa Rica in a May 2009 friendly match against Venezuela (1–1).

He was a non-playing squad member at the 2009 CONCACAF Gold Cup.

== Personal life ==
He is married to Solange Rodríguez and they have three children.

== Honours ==
Saprissa

- Liga FPD: 2003–04, 2005–06, 2006–07

Herediano

- Liga FPD: 2012 Verano, 2013 Verano, 2015 Verano, 2016 Verano, 2017 Verano, 2018 Apertura
