= Pablo Salazar =

Costa Rican footballer (born 1982)

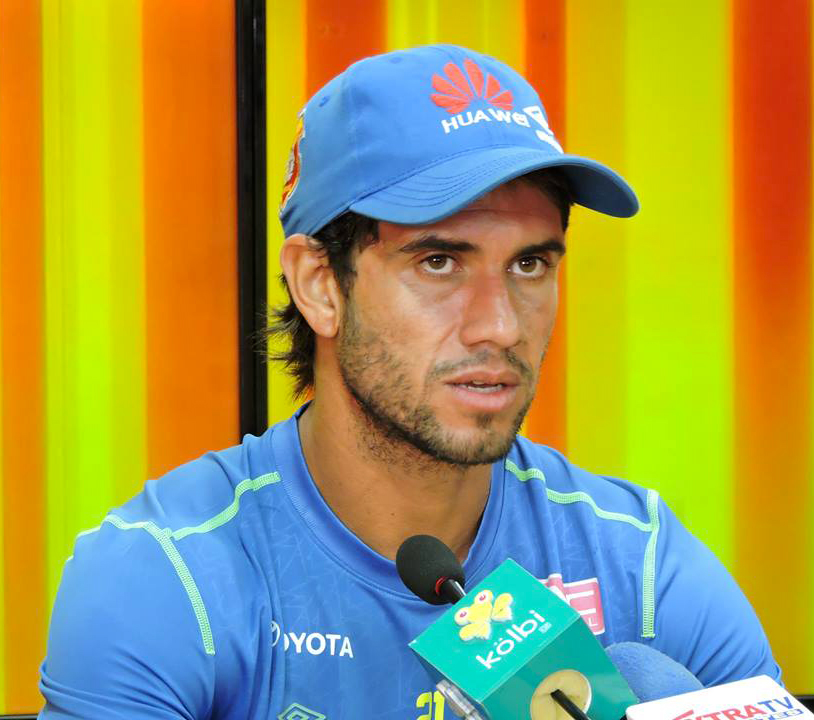

Personal information
- Full name: Pablo Andres Salazar Sánchez
- Date of birth: 21 November 1982 (age 43)
- Place of birth: San José, Costa Rica
- Height: 1.78 m (5 ft 10 in)
- Position: Centre back

Team information
- Current team: Herediano (assistant)

Youth career
- Alajuelense

Senior career*
Years	Team	Apps	(Gls)
2002–2003	Santa Barbara	7	(2)
2003–2006	Cartaginés	49	(0)
2006–2008	Alajuelense	50	(3)
2008–2010	Municipal Liberia	42	(0)
2010–2011	Universidad de Costa Rica	21	(1)
2011–2015	Herediano	93	(10)
2015–2016	Mérida	19	(0)
2016–2019	Herediano	132	(13)

International career
2005–2014	Costa Rica	6	(0)

Managerial career
- 2019–2025: Herediano (assistant)
- 2025–: Herediano (Head coach)
- * Club domestic league appearances and goals

Pablo Andres Salazar Sánchez (born 21 November 1982) is a retired Costa Rican footballer, who played as a centre back. He is currently the head coach of Herediano.

== Club career ==
He made his professional debut at Santa Barbara and also played for Cartaginés, Alajuelense, Municipal Liberia, Universidad de Costa Rica before joining Herediano in summer 2011. In February 2015, he signed with Mérida.

On 3 June 2019 it was confirmed, that Salazar had decided to retire and would continue at Herediano as assistant manager.

== International career ==
Salazar has played at the 2001 FIFA World Youth Championship and competed for Costa Rica at the 2004 Summer Olympics.

He made his senior debut for Costa Rica in a November 2005 friendly match against France and has, as of 14 November 2014, earned a total of 6 caps, scoring no goals. He received a call-up to the national team as it prepared for the 2009 CONCACAF Gold Cup, replacing injured defender Michael Umaña but only won his second cap 7 years after his debut when he played at the 2013 Copa Centroamericana.
