= Alcibíades Rojas =

Panamanian footballer (born 1986)

Personal information
- Full name: Alcibíades Rojas McRay
- Date of birth: 15 August 1986 (age 40)
- Place of birth: Panama City, Panama
- Height: 1.84 m (6 ft 0 in)
- Position: Striker

Youth career
- Sporting SM

Senior career*
Years	Team	Apps	(Gls)
2008	Academia		
2008	Plaza Amador		
2009–2010	Chorrillo		
2010	Juventud Retalteca		
2011	Chorrillo		
2012	Victoria	14	(0)
2012	Chorrillo	15	(1)
2013	→ Atlético Chiriquí (loan)	13	(3)
2013–2014	→ Sporting SM (loan)	8	(0)
2014	Chorrillo	10	(1)
2015	San Francisco	12	(0)

International career^{‡}
2013	Panama	6	(1)
- * Club domestic league appearances and goals ‡ National team caps and goals as of 17 November 2013

Alcibíades Rojas McRay (born 15 August 1986) is a former Panamanian football player.

== Club career ==
Nicknamed Pepón, Rojas has played the majority of his career in his native Panama, but also had spells with Colombian side Academia, Juventud Retalteca in Guatemala and Honduran outfit Victoria.

In June 2013 he joined reigning champions Sporting SM and after his time in jail returned to Chorrillo. In December 2014 he was snapped up by San Francisco, only to be released by the club ahead of the 2015 Apertura.

== International career ==
Rojas made his debut for Panama in a January 2013 friendly match against Guatemala and has, as of November 2013, earned a total of 6 caps, scoring 1 goal. He has represented his country in 2 FIFA World Cup qualification matches and at the 2013 Copa Centroamericana.

=== International goals ===
Scores and results list Panama goal tally first.

N.	Date	Venue	Opponent	Score	Result	Competition
1.	25 January 2013	Estadio Nacional, San José, Costa Rica	Guatemala	2–0	3-1	2013 Copa Centroamericana

== Arrested on kidnapping allegations ==
On 16 November 2013, Rojas was arrested by Panamanian police after they captured an alleged gang of kidnappers, Rojas being one of them. In April 2014 he announced his return to professional football after spending several months in prison.
