= Palmiro Salas =

Guatemalan football coach (born 1964)

Personal information
- Full name: Palmiro Jonathan Salas Sandoval
- Date of birth: 5 August 1964 (age 62)
- Place of birth: Guatemala

Managerial career
- Years: Team
- 1992–1994: Tipografia Nacional
- 2002–20??: San Pedro FC
- –2007: Belizean clubs
- 2007: Revolutionary Conquerors FC
- 2008: Belize
- 2009–20??: Belize Defence Force FC
- Belizean clubs
- Police
- 2018: San Pedro Pirates
- 2018–2019: Belize

Palmiro Salas is a Guatemalan football coach best known for managing the Belize national football team during 2010 World Cup Qualification. Besides Guatemala, he has managed in Belize.

As of 2018, Salas currently manages the San Pedro Pirates of the Premier League of Belize.

== Belize ==
Sacked as head coach of the Belize national team in 2008 which was seen as an unjust decision by the Football Federation of Belize to some, after he led them to a 3–1 win over St Kitts and Nevis, Salas became involved in a conflict with the FFB, making an incendiary statement that they were supposed to pay him 26000 Belize dollars when they only give him 5000.

The Guatemalan returned to Belizean football in 2009 when announced as coach of Belize Defence Force.

In June 2018, he was reappointed as coach for the Belize national team.

== Personal life ==
He was assaulted by two thieves on the 21st of August 2008.
