= Patrick Pemberton =

Costa Rican footballer (born 1982)

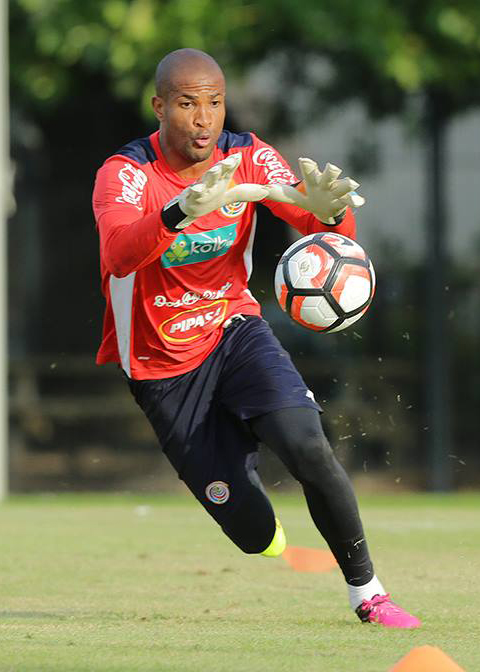
- Pemberton training with Costa Rica in 2017

Personal information
- Full name: Patrick Alberto Pemberton Bernard
- Date of birth: 24 April 1982 (age 44)
- Place of birth: Puerto Limón, Costa Rica
- Height: 1.78 m (5 ft 10 in)
- Position: Goalkeeper

Senior career*
Years	Team	Apps	(Gls)
2003–2019	Alajuelense	337	(0)
2004–2005	→ Carmelita (loan)	14	(0)
2019–2020	A.D. San Carlos	26	(0)
2020–2021	Fútbol Consultants	0	(0)
2021–2023	Carmelita	0	(0)
2023–2025	Santa Ana	29	(0)

International career^{‡}
2009–2018	Costa Rica	39	(0)
- * Club domestic league appearances and goals as of 20 January 2021 ‡ National team caps and goals as of 22 June 2018

Patrick Alberto Pemberton Bernard (born 24 April 1982) is a Costa Rican former professional footballer who played as a goalkeeper.

== Club career ==
Pemberton started his career at Alajuelense but made his league debut for Carmelita on 11 September 2004 against Pérez Zeledón when on loan from Liga. On 15 June 2012 he was awarded the prize for the best goalkeeper of the tournament delivered by Summer 2012 UNAFUT.

In December 2013, he extended his contract with Alajuelense four more years.

Patrick is currently the goalkeeper with most appearances with the club. Pemberton started on his 300th match on 12 April 2017 against San Carlos for the Verano 2017 tournament, matched previous record holder Alejandro González Rojas (whose record stood since 23 September 1990 for a total 27 years, one month and nine days) on 29 October 2017 against Saprissa, and obtained his 316th cap three days later against Pérez Zeledón, both matches corresponding to the Apertura 2017 tournament. Previously, in August 2015 Pemberton surpassed José Alexis Rojas, who at the time was the second most-capped Alajuelense goalkeeper with 218 matches.

== International career ==
Pemberton made his debut for Costa Rica in a September 2010 friendly match against Jamaica and has, as of December 2014, earned a total of 24 caps. He represented his country in 2 FIFA World Cup qualification matches and played at the 2013 and 2014 Copa Centroamericana as well as at the 2013 CONCACAF Gold Cup. He was a non-playing squad member at the 2014 FIFA World Cup. And played all three games of the Copa América Centenario.

In May 2018 he was named in Costa Rica's 23 man squad for the 2018 FIFA World Cup in Russia.

== Career statistics ==
=== International ===
Statistics accurate as of match played 22 June 2018.

Costa Rica
Year	Apps	Goals
2010	2	0
2011	0	0
2012	3	0
2013	13	0
2014	5	0
2015	3	0
2016	5	0
2017	7	0
2018	0	0
Total	38	0
