= Christopher Meneses =

Costa Rican footballer (born 1990)

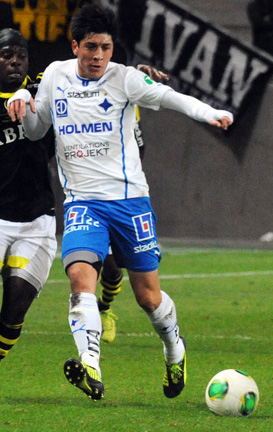

Personal information
- Full name: Christopher Meneses Barrantes
- Date of birth: May 2, 1990 (age 36)
- Place of birth: Costa Rica
- Height: 1.79 m (5 ft 10 1/2 in)
- Position: Defender

Team information
- Current team: Sporting San José

Senior career*
Years	Team	Apps	(Gls)
2008–2012	Alajuelense	116	(9)
2013–2015	IFK Norrköping	32	(2)
2015–2020	Alajuelense	142	(7)
2020–2021	Cariari Pococí		
2021	Santos de Guápiles	44	(0)
2022–	Sporting San José	12	(1)

International career^{‡}
2012	Costa Rica U23	2	(0)
2010–	Costa Rica	20	(0)
- * Club domestic league appearances and goals as of 30 July 2021 ‡ National team caps and goals as of 22 January 2017

Christopher Meneses Barrantes (born May 2, 1990) is a Costa Rican professional footballer who plays as a defender for Sporting San José.

== Club career ==
Meneses came through the youth ranks of Alajuelense for whom he made his senior debut in 2008. In summer 2013 he joined Swedish side IFK Norrköping. After a year and a half with Norrköping they declared in April 2015 that Meneses was free to leave the club after they had reached an agreement that he needed to restart his career somewhere else. In 2015, he returned to Liga Deportiva Alajuelense.

On 13 December 2021, Meneses signed with Sporting San José.

== International career ==
Meneses made his debut for Costa Rica in an August 2010 friendly match against Paraguay and has, as of May 2014, earned a total of 15 caps, scoring no goals. He represented his country in 2 FIFA World Cup qualification matches and played at the 2013 Copa Centroamericana and the 2013 CONCACAF Gold Cup.
