= Belize national football team =

Belize
- Nickname(s): The Jaguars; The Unbelizeables
- Association: Football Federation of Belize (FFB)
- Confederation: CONCACAF (North America)
- Sub-confederation: UNCAF (Central America)
- Head coach: Martín Dall'Orso
- Captain: Woodrow West
- Most caps: Deon McCaulay (63)
- Top scorer: Deon McCaulay (28)
- Home stadium: FFB Stadium
- FIFA code: BLZ
First colours	Second colours

FIFA ranking
- Current: 180 (7 October 2026)
- Highest: 114 (April–June 2016)
- Lowest: 201 (November 2007 – January 2008)

First international
- as British Honduras; British Honduras 1–0 Honduras (British Honduras; 19 February 1928) as Belize; Belize 0–2 Canada (Belize City, Belize; 8 December 1983)

Biggest win
- Belize 7–1 Nicaragua (Belize City, Belize; 17 April 2002)

Biggest defeat
- Costa Rica 7–0 Belize (San José, Costa Rica; 17 March 1999); Mexico 7–0 Belize (Monterrey, Mexico; 21 June 2008); Belize 0–7 Costa Rica (Belmopan, Belize; 21 March 2025)

CONCACAF Gold Cup
- Appearances: 1 (first in 2013)
- Best result: Group stage (2013)

Copa Centroamericana
- Appearances: 11 (first in 1995)
- Best result: 4th place (2013)

The Belize national football team represents Belize in men's international football, and is governed by the Football Federation of Belize, the governing body for football in Belize founded in 1980. It has been a full member of FIFA since 1986, a full member of CONCACAF since 1992, and is also a member of UNCAF in the Central American Zone.

Belize has never qualified for the FIFA World Cup, but has qualified for the CONCACAF Gold Cup once in 2013. Belize has also participated four times in League B and once in League C of the CONCACAF Nations League. In subcontinental competitions, the team finished as fourth place in the 2013 Copa Centroamericana.

Belize's debut in international competitions was in the 1995 UNCAF Nations Cup, and its first appearance in World Cup qualifiers was for 1998 qualification. The team's first victory as British Honduras was in 1928 by defeating Honduras 1–0, which was also its first match ever. As Belize, the first victory was in 2001 by defeating Nicaragua 2–0.

== History ==
=== Overview ===
Named British Honduras whilst under British colonial rule, the country's first international match was in 1928, beating Honduras 1–0. Following independence, Belize's first game came on 8 December 1983, in a 2–0 loss against Canada in Belize. Although Belize gained independence from the United Kingdom in 1981 (and many of the UK's current colonies have international teams), Belize did not begin to regularly play international football until 1995. It made its debut at the 1995 UNCAF Nations Cup and was eliminated in the first round after losing to El Salvador and Costa Rica.

Belize has never qualified for the World Cup but finished fourth in the 2013 Copa Centroamericana. Their fourth-place finish in the 2013 Copa Centroamericana gave Belize its first qualification to a major international competition, that being the 2013 CONCACAF Gold Cup.

=== June 2011 suspension by FIFA ===
On 15 June 2011, Belize kicked off its 2014 FIFA World Cup qualification campaign against minnows Montserrat, winning 2–5 away in a match played in the Ato Boldon Stadium in Couva, Trinidad. However, the return which was scheduled for June 19 was postponed by FIFA when they suspended the FFB due to governmental interference.

== Team image ==
In February 2023 the Football Federation of Belize unveiled a new logo that would represent Belize’s national teams. Created by Rolando Ramirez, the new logo prominently features a Jaguar, the nickname of the team. The FFB hoped that the new image would promote unity and pride in the Belize football community.

=== Kit sponsorship ===
Kit supplier	Period
Runic	2005–2006
(Mexico) Keuka	2008
(Guatemala) Rotto	2011
(Guatemala) Spadd	2012
(United States) Nike	2013
None	2014–Present

== Stadium ==
FFB Stadium in Belmopan is the home stadium for the Belize national football team. Prior to this stadium, Belize had no facilities that met FIFA specifications. Apart from this Belize has many fields to play on but with no facilities for the players.

== Results and fixtures ==
The following is a list of match results in the last 12 months, as well as any future matches that have been scheduled.

Win Draw Loss Fixture

=== 2025 ===
15 November 2025-26 CONCACAF Series	Saint Martin	0–1	Belize	Basseterre, Saint Kitts and Nevis
19:00 AST		Report	Wade 26'	Stadium: SKNFA Technical Center

18 November 2025-26 CONCACAF Series	Saint Kitts and Nevis	2–6	Belize	Basseterre, Saint Kitts and Nevis
16:00 AST	Matthew 71', 85'	Report	Wade 9', 28', 43'; Meza Jr. 80', 82'; Martinez 90+3'	Stadium: SKNFA Technical Center

=== 2026 ===
27 March 2025–26 CONCACAF Series	Belize	2–3	Sint Maarten	Santiago de los Caballeros (Dominican Republic)
19:30 UTC−4	Reneau 37' (pen.); Polanco 55'	Report	Illidge 34'; Amatkarijo 77', 90+1'	Stadium: Estadio Cibao FC; Referee: Wikelson Bonnet (Haiti)

30 March 2025–26 CONCACAF Series	Guyana	3–1	Belize	Santiago de los Caballeros (Dominican Republic)
16:30 UTC−4	De Rosario 2', 22', 90+1'	Report	Desmond Wade 8'	Stadium: Estadio Cibao FC; Referee: Eric de la Cruz (Cuba)

26 September 2026–27 CONCACAF Nations League	Sint Maarten	0–1	Belize	Belmopan, Belize
22:00 UTC−4	R. Olivacce (red card) 35'	Report	N. Guerra 52'	Stadium: FFB Stadium

29 September 2026–27 CONCACAF Nations League	Belize	0–1	Saint Vincent and the Grenadines	Belmopan, Belize
22:00 UTC−4		Report	Johnson 10'	Stadium: FFB Stadium; Attendance: 538; Referee: Orlando Alvarado (Guatemala)

3 October 2026–27 CONCACAF Nations League	Belize	0–2	French Guiana	Belmopan, Belize
22:00 UTC−4		Report	Anakaba 78'; Haabo 84'	Stadium: FFB Stadium; Attendance: 553; Referee: Richard Tejada (Panama)

6 October 2026–27 CONCACAF Nations League	French Guiana	1–0	Belize	Belmopan, Belize
22:00 UTC−4	Nozile 84'	Report		Stadium: FFB Stadium; Referee: Waldir García (El Salvador)

14 November 2026–27 CONCACAF Nations League	Saint Vincent and the Grenadines	v	Belize	Kingstown, Saint Vincent and the Grenadines
				Stadium: Arnos Vale Stadium

17 November 2026–27 CONCACAF Nations League	Belize	v	Sint Maarten	Kingstown, Saint Vincent and the Grenadines
				Stadium: Arnos Vale Stadium

== Coaching staff ==
Name	Nat	Position
Martín Dall'Orso	(Peru)	Head coach
Joaquín Lobón	(Belize)	Technical Consultant
Norman Koko	(Belize)	Assistant head coach
Dale Pelayo Sr.	(Belize)	Assistant head coach
TBD	(Belize)	Goalkeeping coach
TBD	(Belize)	Physical Trainer
Thomas Rivars	(Belize)	Physiotherapist

=== Coaching history ===
Since the creation of the national team in 1995, several coaches have been in charge of managing Belize. From 1995 to 1996, Winston Michael was appointed as Belize's first ever manager.

Manager	Period in charge	Played	Won	Drawn	Lost	Win %
(Belize) Winston Michael	1995–1996	4	0	0	4	0.0
(Argentina) Manuel Bilches	1999–2000	6	0	1	5	0.0
(Costa Rica) Leroy Sherrier Lewis	2001	5	3	1	1	60.0
(Brazil) Eduardo Santana	2003	0	0	0	0	—
(Belize) Anthony Adderly	2003–2006	5	0	0	5	0.0
(Brazil) Antonio Carlos Vieira	2006–2007	3	0	0	3	0.0
(Guatemala) Palmiro Salas	2008	2	1	0	1	50.0
(United States) Ian Mork	2008	4	0	1	3	0.0
(Mexico) Renan Couoh	2008–2009	3	0	1	2	0.0
(Honduras) José de la Paz Herrera	2010–2012	7	2	2	3	28.6
(Costa Rica) Leroy Sherrier Lewis	2012–2013	5	1	1	3	20.0
(Belize) Charlie Slusher	2013	1	0	1	0	0.0
(United States) Ian Mork	2013–2014	4	0	1	3	0.0
(Costa Rica) Leroy Sherrier Lewis	2014–2015	3	0	0	3	0.0
(Brazil) Jorge Nunez	2015–2016	4	2	2	0	50.0
(Poland) (United States) Richard Orlowski	2016–2018	5	0	1	4	0.0
(Guatemala) Palmiro Salas	2018–2019	6	3	1	2	50.0
(Italy) Vincenzo Alberto Annese	2019–2020	6	2	1	3	33.3
(Belize) Dale Pelayo Sr.	2020–2021	3	1	0	2	33.3
(Spain) David Perez Asensio	2022–2024	17	3	4	10	17.6
(Belize) Charlie Slusher	2024–2025	8	4	0	4	50.0
(Belize) Philip Marin	2025	4	2	0	2	50.0
(Uruguay) Daniel Bartolotta	2025–2026		0	0	0	0.0
(Peru) Martín Dall'Orso	2026–present		0	0	0	0.0

== Players ==
=== Current squad ===
The following players were called up for the 2026–27 CONCACAF Nations League matches against Saint Vincent and the Grenadines and Sint Maarten on 14 and 17 November 2026, respectively.

Caps and goals correct as of 14 November 2026, after the match against Saint Vincent and the Grenadines.

No.	Pos.	Player	Date of birth (age)	Caps	Goals	Club
1	GK	Charles Tillett	29 July 2001 (age 25)	22	0	(Football Federation of Belize) Port Layola
22	GK	Woodrow West	19 September 1985 (age 41)	54	0	(Football Federation of Belize) Verdes
2	DF	Eugene Martínez	20 October 1997 (age 29)	21	3	(United States Soccer Federation) L.A. Wolves FC
3	DF	Norman Anderson	25 January 1997 (age 29)	20	0	(Football Federation of Belize) Napoles
5	DF	Jordan Casanova	30 April 2004 (age 22)	2	0	(Football Federation of Belize) Progresso
16	DF	Jahryl Smith	8 October 2003 (age 23)	8	0	(Football Federation of Belize) Verdes
17	DF	Jaylen Lennan	17 June 2002 (age 24)	13	0	(Football Federation of Belize) Verdes
23	DF	Harlan Casanova	3 December 1997 (age 28)	6	0	(Football Federation of Belize) Progresso
6	MF	Andir Chi	17 November 2000 (age 25)	18	0	(Football Federation of Belize) Progresso
7	MF	Nahjib Guerra	18 August 1994 (age 32)	29	1	(Football Federation of Belize) Verdes
8	MF	Warren Moss	13 October 1999 (age 27)	17	1	(Football Federation of Belize) Napoles
14	MF	Darrel Myvett	15 December 1993 (age 32)	33	0	(Football Federation of Belize) Verdes
15	MF	Freybin Pagoada	22 March 2002 (age 24)	11	0	(Football Federation of Belize) Verdes
	MF	Jordy Polanco	8 June 1996 (age 30)	38	6	(Football Federation of Belize) Verdes
9	FW	Carlos Bernárdez	28 December 1992 (age 33)	22	7	(National Autonomous Federation of Football of Honduras) Victoria
10	FW	Jaheim Mena	23 February 2006 (age 20)	6	0	(Football Federation of Belize) Progresso
11	FW	Horace Ávila	18 September 1999 (age 27)	19	1	(Mexican Football Federation) Tepatitlán
13	FW	Keydenshaay Bowen	8 October 2005 (age 21)	3	0	(Football Federation of Belize) Progresso
19	FW	Daijon Daniels	2 February 2003 (age 23)	5	0	(Football Federation of Belize) Napoles
	FW	Krisean Lopez	2 November 1998 (age 28)	39	5	(Football Federation of Belize) Verdes

=== Recent call-ups ===
The following players have been called up within the past 12 months.

Pos.	Player	Date of birth (age)	Caps	Goals	Club	Latest call-up
GK	Erick Rodríguez	8 January 2009 (age 17)	0	0	(Belize) San Pedro Pirates	v. French Guiana, 7 October 2026
GK	Earl Dyck	8 January 2009 (age 17)	0	0	(Belize) Rising Stars	v. Guyana, 30 March 2026
DF	Deshawon Nembhard	8 October 1994 (age 32)	20	1	(Belize) Verdes	v. French Guiana, 7 October 2026
DF	Jahron Myvette	9 May 1995 (age 31)	8	0	(Belize) Verdes	v. Guyana, 30 March 2026
DF	Alence Ayala	29 April 1999 (age 27)	10	0	(Belize) Verdes	v. Guyana, 30 March 2026
DF	Jamal Brooks	23 December 2001 (age 24)	1	0	(United States) USAO Drovers	v. Guyana, 30 March 2026
DF	Everal Trapp	22 January 1987 (age 39)	55	0	Free agent	v. Guyana, 30 March 2026
MF	Orlando Velásquez	18 December 1998 (age 27)	5	2	(Belize) Port Layola	v. French Guiana, 7 October 2026
MF	Marlon Meza Jr.	26 March 2009 (age 17)	2	0	(Jamaica) Mount Pleasant Academy	v. French Guiana, 7 October 2026
MF	Owen Sosa	17 April 2002 (age 24)	7	0	(Belize) Verdes	v. French Guiana, 7 October 2026
MF	Michael Palacio	15 February 2002 (age 24)	10	1	(Belize) Port Layola	v. French Guiana, 7 October 2026
MF	Izon Gill	27 December 1999 (age 26)	7	0	(Belize) Belmopan	v. Guyana, 30 March 2026
FW	Moisés Hernández	26 May 1998 (age 28)	9	1	(Belize) San Pedro Pirates	v. French Guiana, 7 October 2026
FW	Desmond Wade	31 August 1997 (age 29)	4	1	(Belize) Verdes	v. French Guiana, 7 October 2026

== Records ==
As of 30 March 2026
Players in bold are still active with Belize.

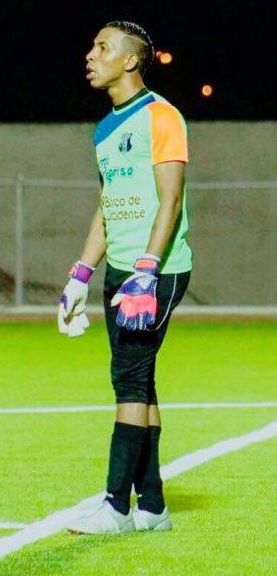
Woodrow West has played 52 games for Belize

=== Most appearances ===
Rank	Player	Caps	Goals	Career
1	Deon McCaulay	63	28	2007–2022
2	Elroy Smith	61	6	2004–2019
3	Ian Gaynair	57	2	2007–2022
4	Evral Trapp	55	0	2010–2024
5	**Woodrow West**	52	0	2008–present
6	Dalton Eiley	41	0	2005–2019
6	Daniel Jiménez	41	2	2008–2019
8	Harrison Róchez	40	5	2004–2019
9	**Krisean Lopez**	38	5	2018–present
10	Trevor Lennan	37	1	2005–2019

=== Top goalscorers ===
Rank	Player	Goals	Caps	Ratio	Career
1	Deon McCaulay	28	63	0.44	2007–2022
2	**Carlos Bernárdez**	7	21	0.33	2019–present
3	Elroy Kuylen	6	33	0.18	2009–2019
3	**Jordy Polanco**	6	36	0.17	2015–present
3	Elroy Smith	6	61	0.1	2004–2019
6	**Desmond Wade**	5	5	1	2021–present
6	Dion Frazer	5	8	0.63	2000–2008
6	**Krisean Lopez**	5	38	0.13	2018–present
6	Harrison Róchez	5	40	0.13	2004–2019
10	Norman Nuñez	3	11	0.27	1995–2005
10	Vallan Symms	3	20	0.15	2000–2011
10	**Pele Martínez**	3	23	0.13	2022–present
10	**Michael Salazar**	3	23	0.13	2013–present

== Competitive record ==
=== FIFA World Cup ===
FIFA World Cup record										Qualification record					
Year	Round	Pos.	Pld	W	D	L	GF	GA	Squad	Pld	W	D	L	GF	GA
1930 to 1978	Part of United Kingdom									Part of United Kingdom					
1982 and 1986	Not a FIFA member									Not a FIFA member					
1990 and 1994	Did not participate									Declined participation					
(France) 1998	Did not qualify									2	0	0	2	2	6
(South Korea) (Japan) 2002	Did not qualify									4	0	1	3	2	10
(Germany) 2006	Did not qualify									2	0	0	2	0	8
(South Africa) 2010	Did not qualify									4	1	1	2	4	11
(Brazil) 2014	Did not qualify									8	4	1	3	17	13
(Russia) 2018	Did not qualify									6	2	3	1	7	6
(Qatar) 2022	Did not qualify									3	1	0	2	5	5
(Canada) (Mexico) (United States) 2026	Did not qualify									4	0	0	4	1	10
(Morocco) (Portugal) (Spain) 2030	To be determined									To be determined					
(Saudi Arabia) 2034	To be determined									To be determined					
Total	—	0/8	—							33	8	6	19	38	69

=== CONCACAF Gold Cup ===
CONCACAF Championship / Gold Cup record										Qualification record					
Year	Round	Pos.	Pld	W	D	L	GF	GA	Squad	Pld	W	D	L	GF	GA
1963 to 1981	Part of United Kingdom									Part of United Kingdom					
1985	Not a CONCACAF member									Not a CONCACAF member					
1989 to 1993	Did not participate									Did not participate					
(United States) 1996	Did not qualify									Copa Centroamericana					
(United States) 1998	Did not qualify									Copa Centroamericana					
(United States) 2000	Did not qualify									Copa Centroamericana					
(United States) 2002	Did not qualify									Copa Centroamericana					
(Mexico) (United States) 2003	Did not participate									Did not participate					
(United States) 2005	Did not qualify									Copa Centroamericana					
(United States) 2007	Did not qualify									Copa Centroamericana					
(United States) 2009	Did not qualify									Copa Centroamericana					
(United States) 2011	Did not qualify									Copa Centroamericana					
(United States) 2013	Group stage	12th	3	0	0	3	1	11	Squad	Copa Centroamericana					
(Canada) (United States) 2015	Did not qualify									Copa Centroamericana					
(United States) 2017	Did not qualify									Copa Centroamericana					
(Costa Rica) (Jamaica) (United States) 2019	Did not qualify									4	2	0	2	6	3
(United States) 2021	Did not qualify									CONCACAF Nations League					
(Canada) (United States) 2023	Did not qualify									CONCACAF Nations League					
(Canada) (United States) 2025	Did not qualify									8	5	1	2	14	16
Total	Group stage	1/16	3	0	0	3	1	11	—	57	10	6	41	48	116

CONCACAF Championship / Gold Cup history
First match	Belize 1–6 United States (9 July 2013; Portland, United States)
Biggest win	—
Biggest defeat	Belize 1–6 United States (9 July 2013; Portland, United States)
Best result	Group stage (2013)
Worst result	Group stage (2013)

=== CONCACAF Nations League ===
CONCACAF Nations League record
League phase											Final phase									
Season	League	Group	Pos.	Pld	W	D	L	GF	GA	P/R	Finals	Round	Pos.	Pld	W	D	L	GF	GA	Squad
2019−20	B	A	12th	6	2	0	4	6	12	Same position	(United States) 2021	Ineligible								
2022–23	B	D	16th	6	0	1	5	2	10	Same position	(United States) 2023	Ineligible								
2023–24	B	C	11th	6	2	1	3	5	7	▼	(United States) 2024	Ineligible								
2024–25	C	B	2nd	4	4	0	0	9	0	▲	(United States) 2025	Ineligible								
2026–27	B	D	TBD								2027 (Note: Since the 2026–27 CONCACAF Nations League, a final phase has been held for each league.)	Did not qualify								
Total				22	8	2	12	22	29	—	Total	—								

CONCACAF Nations League history
First match	French Guiana 3–0 Belize (5 September 2019; Cayenne, French Guiana)
Biggest win	Turks and Caicos Islands 0–4 Belize (7 September 2024; Providenciales, Turks and Caicos Islands)
Biggest defeat	Saint Kitts and Nevis 4–0 Belize (10 October 2019; Belmopan, Belize)
Best result	League B (2023–24); League C (2024–25)
Worst result	League B (2022–23)

=== Copa Centroamericana ===
Copa Centroamericana record
Year	Round	Pos.	Pld	W	D	L	GF	GA
1991 and 1993	Did not participate							
(El Salvador) 1995	Group stage	6th	2	0	0	2	1	5
(Guatemala) 1997	Preliminary round	7th	2	0	1	1	1	2
(Costa Rica) 1999	Group stage	6th	2	0	0	2	1	12
(Honduras) 2001	Group stage	6th	2	0	1	1	3	7
(Panama) 2003	Did not participate							
(Guatemala) 2005	Group stage	7th	3	0	0	3	0	7
(El Salvador) 2007	Group stage	7th	3	0	0	3	3	7
(Honduras) 2009	Group stage	7th	3	0	1	2	3	7
(Panama) 2011	Group stage	7th	3	0	1	2	3	8
(Costa Rica) 2013	Fourth place	4th	5	1	1	3	2	4
(United States) 2014	Group stage	7th	3	0	0	3	1	6
(Panama) 2017	Group stage	6th	5	0	1	4	2	10
Total	Fourth place	11/11	30	1	6	23	19	69

Belize's international debut in the 1995 UNCAF Nations Cup.

== Head-to-head record ==
Updated on 3 October 2026 after match against French Guiana

Positive Record Neutral Record Negative Record

Opponent	P	W	D	L	GF	GA	GF
Anguilla	2	2	0	0	2	0	+2
Bahamas	1	1	0	0	4	0	+4
Barbados	2	1	1	0	1	0	+1
Belize	1	0	0	1	0	1	–1
Bermuda	2	0	1	1	1	2	−1
Canada	5	0	1	4	1	14	−13
Cayman Islands	2	0	2	0	1	1	0
Costa Rica	8	0	0	8	2	32	−30
Cuba	3	1	0	2	3	9	−6
Dominican Republic	4	2	0	2	5	5	0
El Salvador	10	0	0	10	6	29	−23
French Guiana	9	4	2	3	10	9	+1
Grenada	5	2	0	3	11	11	0
Guatemala	13	0	4	9	10	23	−13
Guyana	3	2	0	1	7	4	+3
Haiti	1	0	0	1	0	2	–2
Honduras	10	1	0	9	4	24	−20
Jamaica	1	0	1	0	2	2	0
Mexico	2	0	0	2	0	9	−9
Montserrat	4	2	0	2	8	5	+3
Nicaragua	13	4	3	6	19	25	–6
Panama	7	0	2	5	3	12	−9
Puerto Rico	3	2	1	0	5	1	+4
Saint Martin	1	1	0	0	1	0	+1
Saint Kitts and Nevis	5	3	1	1	11	8	+3
Saint Vincent and the Grenadines	6	2	2	3	6	8	–2
Sint Maarten	1	0	0	1	2	3	–1
Turks and Caicos Islands	3	3	0	0	12	0	+12
Trinidad and Tobago	2	0	2	0	0	0	0
United States	1	0	0	1	1	6	−5
Total	129	34	22	73	137	242	−105
