= 2013 Copa Centroamericana =

Tournament details
- Host country: Costa Rica
- Dates: 18–27 January
- Teams: 7 (from 1 sub-confederation)
- Venue: 1 (in 1 host city)

Final positions
- Champions: Costa Rica (7th title)
- Runners-up: Honduras
- Third place: El Salvador
- Fourth place: Belize

Tournament statistics
- Matches played: 14
- Goals scored: 22 (1.57 per match)
- Attendance: 48,683 (3,477 per match)
- Top scorer(s): (Costa Rica) Jairo Arrieta (2 goals)
- Best player: (Costa Rica) Patrick Pemberton
- Best goalkeeper: (Costa Rica) Patrick Pemberton

The 2013 Copa Centroamericana was the 12th Copa Centroamericana, the regional championship for men's national association football teams in Central America. It was organized by the Unión Centroamericana de Fútbol or UNCAF, and took place in Costa Rica from 18 January to 27 January 2013. The top five teams go on to participate in the 2013 CONCACAF Gold Cup.

The tournament consisted of two stages. In the group stage of the tournament finals, the seven teams competed for points in two round-robin groups, one of four teams and the other of three, with the top two teams in each group proceeding. These four teams advanced to the semi-final stage, with the winners advancing to the final, while the losers contested a third-place match. The fifth-place match was played between the third-ranked teams from the group stage.

In the final, Costa Rica defeated defending champions Honduras 1–0, with Giancarlo González's goal in the 38th minute giving Costa Rica their seventh Central American title; they also became the first host nation to win the tournament since Costa Rica did it in 1999. The final between Costa Rica and Honduras, being the fifth time the two teams have contested final together, became the most frequent match-up at that stage. Belize made history in this tournament by managing to advance to the semifinals and qualifying to compete in the CONCACAF Gold Cup for the first time.

== Participating nations ==
All seven UNCAF members participated in the tournament:

- Belize
- Costa Rica (Hosts)
- El Salvador
- Guatemala
- Honduras (Defending Champions)
- Nicaragua
- Panama

== Venue ==
All matches were played at Estadio Nacional in San José, built as a replacement for the original National Stadium and opened in 2011.

2013 Copa Centroamericana is located in Costa Rica	San José
2013 Copa Centroamericana is located in Costa Rica	Estadio Nacional
2013 Copa Centroamericana is located in Costa Rica	Capacity: 35,060

== Group stage ==
The group stage draw was held in San José on October 9, 2012.

Tiebreakers

1. Greater number of points in matches between the tied teams.
2. Greater goal difference in matches between the tied teams (if more than two teams finish equal on points).
3. Greater number of goals scored in matches among the tied teams (if more than two teams finish equal on points).
4. Greater goal difference in all group matches.
5. Greater number of goals scored in all group matches.
6. Drawing of lots.

All times local (UTC−06:00).

Key to colors in group tables
Group winners and runners-up advance to the semifinals
Group third placed teams advance to the fifth place match

=== Group A ===
Team	Pld	W	D	L	GF	GA	GD	Pts
Costa Rica	3	2	1	0	4	1	+3	7
Belize	3	1	1	1	2	2	0	4
Guatemala	3	0	3	0	2	2	0	3
Nicaragua	3	0	1	2	2	5	−3	1

18 January 2013
16:00

Guatemala	1–1	Nicaragua
Espinoza 67'	Report	Quijano 41'

Estadio Nacional, San José
Attendance: 200
Referee: Joel Aguilar (El Salvador)
18 January 2013
20:00

Costa Rica	1–0	Belize
Arrieta 55'	Report

Estadio Nacional, San José
Attendance: 5,484
Referee: Héctor Rodríguez (Honduras)

20 January 2013
14:00

Belize	0–0	Guatemala
	Report

Estadio Nacional, San José
Attendance: 250
Referee: Elmer Bonilla (El Salvador)
20 January 2013
18:00

Costa Rica	2–0	Nicaragua
Lagos 7'; Borges 86'	Report

Estadio Nacional, San José
Attendance: 5,980
Referee: Roberto Moreno (Panama)

22 January 2013
16:00

Nicaragua	1–2	Belize
Figueroa 85'	Report	Lennen 29'; McCaulay 90+1'

Estadio Nacional, San José
Attendance: 750
Referee: Joel Aguilar (El Salvador)
22 January 2013
20:00

Costa Rica	1–1	Guatemala
Arrieta 11'	Report	Contreras 90'

Estadio Nacional, San José
Attendance: 6,760
Referee: Héctor Rodríguez (Honduras)

=== Group B ===
Team	Pld	W	D	L	GF	GA	GD	Pts
Honduras	2	0	2	0	2	2	0	2
El Salvador	2	0	2	0	1	1	0	2
Panama	2	0	2	0	1	1	0	2

El Salvador and Panama finished with identical records and so their positions were determined by drawing of lots. El Salvador won and was placed second.

18 January 2013
18:00

Honduras	1–1	El Salvador
Bengtson 75'	Report	Burgos 77'

Estadio Nacional, San José
Attendance: 2,500
Referee: Walter López (Guatemala)

20 January 2013
16:00

El Salvador	0–0	Panama
	Report

Estadio Nacional, San José
Attendance: 250
Referee: Wálter Quesada (Costa Rica)

22 January 2013
18:00

Panama	1–1	Honduras
Sánchez 13'	Report	Montes 31'

Estadio Nacional, San José
Attendance: 3,450
Referee: Roberto García (Mexico)

== Final stage ==
In case of a draw, no extra time would be played, and the match would be decided by a penalty shoot-out.

Semi-finals
Honduras	1
Belize	0
Costa Rica	1
El Salvador	0

Final
Honduras	0
Costa Rica	1
Third place
Belize	0
El Salvador	1

Fifth place
Guatemala	1
Panama	3

=== Fifth place match ===
25 January 2013
15:00

Guatemala	1–3	Panama
López 75'	Report	Pérez 28'; Rojas 55'; Quintero 59'

Estadio Nacional, San José
Attendance: 279
Referee: Wálter Quesada (Costa Rica)

=== Semifinals ===
25 January 2013
17:30

Honduras	1–0	Belize
Beckeles 67'	Report

Estadio Nacional, San José
Attendance: 1,644
Referee: Walter López (Guatemala)
25 January 2013
20:00

Costa Rica	1–0	El Salvador
Wallace 72'	Report

Estadio Nacional, San José
Attendance: 4,993
Referee: Roberto García (Mexico)

=== Third place match ===
27 January 2013
14:30

El Salvador	1–0	Belize
Bonilla 50'	Report

Estadio Nacional, San José
Attendance: 1,997
Referee: Sandy Vásquez (Dominican Republic)

=== Final ===
27 January 2013
17:00

Costa Rica	1–0	Honduras
González 38'	Report

Estadio Nacional, San José
Attendance: 14,146
Referee: Joel Aguilar (El Salvador)

Costa Rica	Honduras

COSTA RICA:
GK	18	Patrick Pemberton
DF	3	Giancarlo González
DF	4	Michael Umaña
DF	6	José Salvatierra	(yellow card) 90'
DF	7	Christopher Meneses
MF	5	Celso Borges	(yellow card) 29'
MF	7	Ariel Rodríguez
MF	10	Osvaldo Rodríguez		(substituted off) 84'
MF	20	Rodney Wallace	(yellow card) 34'	(substituted off) 73'
FW	21	Randall Brenes		(substituted off) 90'
FW	9	Alvaro Saborío
Substitutions:
DF	17	Juan Diego Madrigal		(substituted on) 73'
DF	2	Pablo Salazar		(substituted on) 84'
FW	10	Jairo Arrieta		(substituted on) 90'
Manager:
(Colombia) Jorge Luis Pinto

HONDURAS:
GK	22	Donis Escober
DF	2	Brayan Beckeles
DF	5	Víctor Bernárdez
DF	13	Juan Pablo Montes
DF	6	Juan Carlos García	(yellow card) 70'
MF	10	Mario Martínez
MF	11	Jerry Bengtson
MF	8	Arnold Peralta	(yellow card) 61'	(substituted off) 72'
MF	14	Oscar Boniek García
FW	19	Luis Garrido	(yellow card) 52'
FW	21	Roger Rojas
Substitutions:
FW	17	Georgie Welcome		(substituted on) 72'
Manager:
(Colombia) Luis Fernando Suárez

2013 Copa
Centroamericana champions

Costa Rica
Seventh title

== Awards ==
Golden Ball

- (Costa Rica) Patrick Pemberton

Golden Boot

- (Costa Rica) Jairo Arrieta (2 goals)

Golden Glove

- (Costa Rica) Patrick Pemberton

== Goalscorers ==
2 goals

- (Costa Rica) Jairo Arrieta

1 goal

- (Belize) Trevor Lennen
- (Belize) Deon McCaulay
- (Costa Rica) Celso Borges
- (Costa Rica) Giancarlo González
- (Costa Rica) Cristian Lagos
- (Costa Rica) Rodney Wallace
- (El Salvador) Nelson Bonilla
- (El Salvador) Rafael Burgos
- (Guatemala) José Manuel Contreras
- (Guatemala) David Espinoza
- (Guatemala) Minor López
- (Honduras) Brayan Beckeles
- (Honduras) Jerry Bengtson
- (Honduras) Juan Pablo Montes
- (Nicaragua) Elvis Figueroa
- (Nicaragua) Josue Quijano
- (Panama) Blas Pérez
- (Panama) Alberto Quintero
- (Panama) Alcibíades Rojas
- (Panama) Marcos Sánchez

== Final standings ==
Rank	Team
1st place, gold medalist(s)	Costa Rica
2nd place, silver medalist(s)	Honduras
3rd place, bronze medalist(s)	El Salvador
4	Belize
5	Panama
6	Guatemala
7	Nicaragua
