= List of football clubs in Belize =

This is a list of association football clubs located in Belize. For a complete list, see Category:Football clubs in Belize

== B ==
- Barrio Fino F.C.
- Belize Defence Force FC
- Belmopan Bandits
- Belmopan Blaze
- Benque D.C. United
- Boca F.C.

== C ==
- Costa Del Sol Nairi's

== F ==
- FC Belize

== G ==
- Georgetown Ibayani
- Griga United

== I ==
- Ilagulei

== J ==
- Juventus (Belize)

== K ==
- Kremandala
- Kulture Yabra FC

== N ==
- New Site Erei
- Nizhee Corozal

== P ==
- Paradise/Freedom Fighters
- Pickstock Lake
- Placencia Assassins
- Police United (Belmopan)

== R ==
- R.G. City Boys United
- Revolutionary Conquerors

== S ==
- San Felipe Barcelona
- San Ignacio United
- San Pedro Seadogs
- San Pedro Seahawks
- Santel's

== T ==
- Texmar United

== V ==
- Verdes FC

== W ==
- Wagiya
- World FC (Belize)
