= Norman Nuñez =

Belizean footballer (born 1971)

Personal information
- Full name: Norman Nuñez Pipersburgh
- Date of birth: 12 June 1971 (age 55)
- Place of birth: Belize
- Position: Striker

Senior career*
Years	Team	Apps	(Gls)
1992–1993	Acros Brown Bombers		(10)
1993–1997	Suga Boys Juventus		
1997–1998	Kulture Yabra		
1998–1999	Belmopan United	18	(6)
1999	Marathón		
1999–2000	San Pedro Seahawks	17	(4)
2000–2005	Kulture Yabra		
2005–2006	New Site Erei		(13)
2006	FC Belize		
2007	Revolutionary Conquerors		
2007–2009	Kraal Road		
2009–2012	Hankook Verdes		
2012–2014	FC Belize		
2014–2015	Texmar Assassins		

International career
1995–2005	Belize	11	(3)
- * Club domestic league appearances and goals

Norman Nuñez Pipersburgh (born 12 June 1971) is a Belizean retired footballer who played as a striker. He is regarded as one of Belize's best players of all time.

== Club career ==
The much-travelled Nuñez has played for many different teams in his native Belize and had a one-month spell at Honduran side CD Marathón where he broke his foot and never returned to the club. He was 7 times the Belize Premier Football League top goalscorer. He was the outstanding Juventus player when they beat Honduran side Real España 4–1 away in a 1997 CONCACAF Champions' Cup game, the only team to win a continental CONCACAF match for Belize.

== International career ==
Nicknamed Tilliman, Nuñez made his debut for Belize his country's first FIFA acknowledged competitive game, an UNCAF Cup match against El Salvador in November 1995 and went on to earn a total of 11 caps, scoring 3 goals. He has represented Belize in 3 FIFA World Cup qualification matches and played at the 2001 and 2005 UNCAF Nations Cup.

His final international was at that 2005 UNCAF tournament, Belize's third game against Nicaragua.

=== International goals ===
Scores and results list Belize's goal tally first.

#	Date	Venue	Opponent	Score	Result	Competition
1	24 April 2001	MCC Grounds, Belize City, Belize	Nicaragua	2–0	2–0	Friendly match
2	17 April 2002	MCC Grounds, Belize City, Belize	Nicaragua		7–1	Friendly match
3	17 April 2002	MCC Grounds, Belize City, Belize	Nicaragua		7–1	Friendly match
