= 2007 Belize Premier Football League =

The 2007 season of the Belize Premier Football League, otherwise known as the RFG Insurance Cup, began on February 25, 2007 and concluded on June 10, 2007. FC Belize of Belize City won a twelve team league.

== Final league tables ==
=== Group A ===
| Pos | Team | Pld | W | D | L | GF | GA | GD | Pts |
|---|---|---|---|---|---|---|---|---|---|
| 1 | FC Belize (Belize City) | 10 | 7 | 3 | 0 | 21 | 5 | +16 | 24 |
| 2 | Tex Mar Boys (Mango Creek) | 10 | 7 | 1 | 2 | 15 | 7 | +8 | 22 |
| 3 | Wagiya (Dangriga) | 10 | 4 | 1 | 5 | 14 | 10 | +4 | 13 |
| 4 | Hankook Verdes United (Benque Viejo Town) | 10 | 3 | 3 | 4 | 15 | 13 | +2 | 12 |
| 5 | Belmopan Bandits (Belmopan) | 10 | 3 | 1 | 6 | 6 | 26 | −20 | 10 |
| 6 | Toledo United (Toledo) | 10 | 0 | 3 | 7 | 5 | 15 | −10 | 3 |

=== Group B ===
| Pos | Team | Pld | W | D | L | GF | GA | GD | Pts |
|---|---|---|---|---|---|---|---|---|---|
| 1 | Revolutionary Conquerors (Dangriga) | 10 | 6 | 2 | 2 | 26 | 11 | +15 | 20 |
| 2 | Suga Boys Juventus (Orange Walk) | 10 | 5 | 3 | 2 | 18 | 13 | +5 | 18 |
| 3 | Santel's (Santa Elena) | 10 | 5 | 2 | 3 | 14 | 11 | +3 | 17 |
| 4 | Costa Del Sol Nairi's (San Pedro) | 10 | 4 | 2 | 4 | 18 | 15 | +3 | 14 |
| 5 | Alpha Glitters (Orange Walk) | 10 | 3 | 5 | 2 | 10 | 12 | −2 | 14 |
| 6 | Pickstock Lake (Belize City) (Note: Lake I changed name to Pickstock Lake before round 5) | 10 | 0 | 0 | 10 | 5 | 29 | −24 | 0 |

== Results and fixtures ==
Round 1 February 25:

- Wagiya 2-0 Toledo, Verdes 4-0 Belmopan, FC Belize 2-0 Tex Mar (Group A)
- CDS Nairi's 1-1 Alpha, Juventus 2-0 Pickstock, Santel's 1-1 Conquerors (Group B)
