= 2010–11 Belize Premier Football League =

Belize Premier Football League
- Season: 2010–11
- Champions: Opening: Belize Defence Force; Closing: N/A
- Matches: 75
- Goals: 243 (3.24 per match)
- Top goalscorer: Opening: Christian Okonkwo (11); Closing: Evan Mariano (7)
- Biggest home win: Belize Defence Force 7–0 San Pedro Sea Dogs (14 November 2010)
- Biggest away win: Belmopan Blaze 1–6 FC Belize (23 December 2010)
- Highest scoring: Belize Defence Force 7–2 San Felipe Barcelona (17 April 2011)
- Longest unbeaten run: Belize Defence Force (10)

The 2010–11 Belize Premier Football League (also known as the 2010–11 Caribbean Motors Cup) is the highest competitive football league in Belize, which was founded in 1991. There were two seasons, the opening (which was played at the end of 2010) and the closing (which was played at the beginning of 2011). In 2011, the Belize Premier Football League withdrew from the Football Federation of Belize and all remaining games were abandoned. Thus no winner was crowned for the closing season.

== Opening season ==
There were significant team changes from the 2009–10 Belize Premier Football League closing season. Georgetown Ibayani, Paradise Freedom Fighters and Shanaiah Corozal left the league and in came Griga United, San Felipe Barcelona and Toledo Ambassadors. BRC Blaze were also renamed Belmopan Blaze.

The opening season started on 5 September 2010 with the regular season concluding on 23 December 2010. The playoffs, which are the teams which finished in the top 6, will then take place after this date.

On 24 November 2010, San Pedro Sea Dogs withdrew from the league.

On 30 December 2010, it was revealed by the league that Hankook Verdes would be replacing Belmopan Blaze in the playoffs, due to problems with the Blaze.

=== Stadia and locations ===
Location of teams in 2010–11 Opening Season

Team	City	Stadium	Capacity
Belize Defence Force	San Ignacio	Norman Broaster Stadium	2,000
Belmopan Blaze	Belmopan	Isidoro Beaton Stadium & FFB Field	2,500
FC Belize	Belize City	MCC Grounds	3,500
Griga United	Dangriga	Carl Ramos Stadium	3,500
Hankook Verdes	Benque Viejo del Carmen	Marshalleck Stadium	2,000
San Felipe Barcelona	Orange Walk Town	Orange Walk People's Stadium	4,500
San Pedro Sea Dogs	San Pedro Town	Ambergris Stadium	3,500
Toledo Ambassadors	Punta Gorda	Toledo Union Field	1,500

=== Regular stage ===
==== League table ====
Pos	Team	Pld	W	D	L	GF	GA	GD	Pts	Qualification
1	Belize Defence Force (C)	14	11	2	1	34	11	+23	35	Qualification to the Playoffs
2	FC Belize	14	9	2	3	35	19	+16	29	Qualification to the Playoffs
3	Toledo Ambassadors	14	7	3	4	21	16	+5	24	Qualification to the Playoffs
4	Griga United	14	6	4	4	15	13	+2	22	Qualification to the Playoffs
5	San Felipe Barcelona	14	6	3	5	19	21	−2	21	Qualification to the Playoffs
6	Belmopan Blaze	14	4	2	8	15	28	−13	14	
7	Hankook Verdes	14	3	4	7	10	17	−7	13	Qualification to the Playoffs
8	San Pedro Sea Dogs	14	0	0	14	7	46	−39	0	

Updated to match(es) played on 26 December 2010. Source: Soccerway
Rules for classification: 1) points; 2) goal difference; 3) number of goals scored.
(C) Champions

==== Results ====
All of the results on this page have been confirmed by the Belize Premier League. All kick off times are UTC−06:00.

Round 1:

5 September 2010
15:30

Toledo Ambassadors	1–1	Hankook Verdes
A. Makin Jr. 90'		Meza 90+1'

Toledo Union Field, Punta Gorda

5 September 2010
16:00

Griga United	3–0	Belmopan Blaze
Peters 22', 71'; Serano 31'

Carl Ramos Stadium, Dangriga

5 September 2010
16:00

FC Belize	3–1	San Pedro Sea Dogs
Andrews 20' (pen.); McCauley 84'; Davis 88'		Cantun 48'

MCC Grounds, Belize City

5 September 2010
16:00

BDF	4–2	San Felipe Barcelona
D. Jimenez 27', 34', 81'; Martinez 74'		Benavides 15', 45'

Norman Broaster Stadium, San Ignacio

Round 2:

11 September 2010
19:30

Belmopan Blaze	1–3	Toledo Ambassadors
Jones 54'		Torres 10'; Lyons O.G 20'; Garcia 75'

Isidoro Beaton Stadium, Belmopan

11 September 2010
20:00

Hankook Verdes	2–2	FC Belize
Meza 28' (pen.), 47'		Mendez O.G 32'; James 71'

Marshalleck Stadium, Benque Viejo del Carmen

12 September 2010
14:30

San Pedro Sea Dogs	1–2	BDF
Jones 8'		R. Jimenez 40'; O. Jimenez 43'

Ambergris Stadium, San Pedro Town

12 September 2010
16:00

San Felipe Barcelona	1–3	Griga United
Benavides 75' (pen.)		Castillo 19'; Haylock 24'; Bermudez 78'

Orange Walk People's Stadium, Orange Walk Town

Round 3:

19 September 2010
16:00

Toledo Ambassadors	0–1	San Felipe Barcelona
		O. Acebedo 84'

Toledo Union Field, Punta Gorda

19 September 2010
16:00

Griga United	3–2	San Pedro Sea Dogs
Serano 22'; Tasher 39', 63'		Hicks 69' (pen.), 77'

Carl Ramos Stadium, Dangriga

20 September 2010
16:00

FC Belize	4–2	Belmopan Blaze
Martinez 9'; Davis 24', 81'; Okonkwo 78'		Bermudez 48'; Wiltshire 65'

MCC Grounds, Belize City

20 September 2010
16:00

BDF	1–0	Hankook Verdes
Guzman O.G 12'

Norman Broaster Stadium, San Ignacio

Round 4:

2 October 2010
19:30

Belmopan Blaze	1–1	BDF
Hendericks 88'		Casey 56'

Isidoro Beaton Stadium, Belmopan

3 October 2010
14:30

San Pedro Sea Dogs	0–3	Toledo Ambassadors
		A. Makin Jr. 12'; R. Flores 81'; Linarez 87'

Ambergris Stadium, San Pedro Town

3 October 2010
16:00

San Felipe Barcelona	2–1	Hankook Verdes
Benavides 6'; H. Cruz 44'		Monroy 7'

Orange Walk People's Stadium, Orange Walk Town

3 October 2010
16:00

FC Belize	1–0	Griga United
James 77'

MCC Grounds, Belize City

The Round 4 fixtures were put back a week in the schedule, meaning that they were played on 2/3 October 2010 instead of 25/26 September 2010.

Round 5:

9 October 2010
19:30

San Felipe Barcelona	1–3	FC Belize
O. Acebedo 86'		Davis 42'; Okonkwo 61', 90'

Orange Walk People's Stadium, Orange Walk Town

9 October 2010
20:00

Hankook Verdes	0–0	Griga United

Marshalleck Stadium, Benque Viejo del Carmen

10 October 2010
15:00

San Pedro Sea Dogs	0–3	Belmopan Blaze
		Leslie 34'; Bermudez 82'; Jones 89'

Ambergris Stadium, San Pedro Town

10 October 2010
16:00

BDF	4–3	Toledo Ambassadors
Nunez 47'; Mariano 65'; Flores 87', 90+3'		Torres 7', 87'; Linarez 44'

Norman Broaster Stadium, San Ignacio

Round 6:

16 October 2010
17:00

Hankook Verdes	3–0	San Pedro Sea Dogs

Marshalleck Stadium, Benque Viejo del Carmen

16 October 2010
19:30

Belmopan Blaze	1–1	San Felipe Barcelona
Hendericks 22'		E. Cruz 78'

Isidoro Beaton Stadium, Belmopan

17 October 2010
15:30

Toledo Ambassadors	0–0	FC Belize

Toledo Union Field, Punta Gorda

17 October 2010
16:00

Griga United	0–2	BDF
		Mariano 7'; R. Jimenez 90+2'

Carl Ramos Stadium, Dangriga

Hankook Verdes beat San Pedro Sea Dogs 3–0 by default, therefore no goals were actually scored by players.

Round 7:

30 October 2010
19:30

Belmopan Blaze	2–0	Hankook Verdes
Jones 26', 32'

Isidoro Beaton Stadium, Belmopan

31 October 2010
16:00

San Felipe Barcelona	3–2	San Pedro Sea Dogs
Rodriguez 2'; Andrade 38'; L. Acebedo 49'		Andrade O.G 18'; Witzil 67'

Orange Walk People's Stadium, Orange Walk Town

4 November 2010
19:30

Griga United	2–1	Toledo Ambassadors
Burgess 33', 70'		Nunez 61'

Carl Ramos Stadium, Dangriga

31 October 2010
16:00

BDF	2–1	FC Belize
Trapp 31'; D. Jimenez 90+3'		Okonkwo 80'

Norman Broaster Stadium, San Ignacio

The Round 7 fixtures were put back a week in the schedule, meaning that they were played on 30/31 October 2010 instead of 23/24 October 2010.

Round 8:

6 November 2010
20:00

Hankook Verdes	0–1	Toledo Ambassadors
		Bermudez 65'

Marshalleck Stadium, Benque Viejo del Carmen

7 November 2010
15:00

San Pedro Sea Dogs	1–4	FC Belize
Nunez 63'		Andrews 30'; Usher 40', 85'; Okonkwo 61'

Ambergris Stadium, San Pedro Town

7 November 2010
16:00

San Felipe Barcelona	2–0	Belmopan Blaze
Benavides 16'; H. Cruz 71'

Orange Walk People's Stadium, Orange Walk Town

7 November 2010
16:00

BDF	0–0	Griga United

Norman Broaster Stadium, San Ignacio

Round 9:

13 November 2010
20:00

Griga United	1–1	San Felipe Barcelona
Peters 3'		O. Acebedo 32'

Carl Ramos Stadium, Dangriga

14 November 2010
16:00

Toledo Ambassadors	2–0	Belmopan Blaze
D. Makin 50'; Ramirez 84'

Toledo Union Field, Punta Gorda

14 November 2010
16:00

FC Belize	2–0	Hankook Verdes
Okonkwo 65'; Davis 71'

MCC Grounds, Belize City

14 November 2010
16:00

BDF	7–0	San Pedro Sea Dogs
Nunez 14', 59'; Mariano 33', 46'; Cho 84'; D. Jimenez 86'; Casey 88'

Norman Broaster Stadium, San Ignacio

Round 12:

28 November 2010
15:30

Toledo Ambassadors	0–3	BDF
		Lennen 30'; R. Jimenez 68'; O. Jimenez 90'

Toledo Union Field, Punta Gorda

28 November 2010
16:00

Griga United	1–1	Hankook Verdes
Castillo 49'		Meza 34'

Carl Ramos Stadium, Dangriga

28 November 2010
16:00

FC Belize	3–2	San Felipe Barcelona
Okonkwo 19'; A. Jones 38'; Usher 90+1'		Benavides 60'; Rodriguez 62'

MCC Grounds, Belize City

Belmopan Blaze were awarded a victory, due to the withdrawal of San Pedro Sea Dogs.

Round 13:

4 December 2010
19:30

San Felipe Barcelona	2–1	BDF
Benavides 2', 90+1' (pen.)		O. Jimenez 84'

Orange Walk People's Stadium, Orange Walk Town

5 December 2010
16:00

Belmopan Blaze	0–1	Griga United
		Castillo 80'

FFB Field, Belmopan

5 December 2010
16:00

FC Belize	3–4	Toledo Ambassadors
McCauley 7'; Andrews 25' (pen.); Perez 74'		Ramirez 1'; Garcia 30' (pen.), 84' (pen.); Torres 85'

MCC Grounds, Belize City

Hankook Verdes were awarded a victory, due to the withdrawal of San Pedro Sea Dogs.

Round 14:

11 December 2010
20:00

Hankook Verdes	1–4	Belmopan Blaze
Eiley 83'		Jones 34', 57' (pen.); Leslie 70', 90+1'

Marshalleck Stadium, Benque Viejo del Carmen

12 December 2010
16:00

Toledo Ambassadors	2–0	Griga United
R. Flores 34', 39'

Toledo Union Field, Punta Gorda

12 December 2010
16:00

FC Belize	1–2	BDF
James 28'		Trapp 12'; Symms 38' (pen.)

MCC Grounds, Belize City

San Felipe Barcelona were awarded a victory, due to the withdrawal of San Pedro Sea Dogs.

Round 10:

18 December 2010
20:00

Hankook Verdes	1–0	San Felipe Barcelona
R. Cano 63'

Marshalleck Stadium, Benque Viejo del Carmen

19 December 2010
16:00

Griga United	1–2	FC Belize
Serano 30'		Okonkwo 42'; D. Jones 48'

Carl Ramos Stadium, Dangriga

19 December 2010
16:00

BDF	4–0	Belmopan Blaze
D. Jimenez 22', 48'; Velasquez 58'; Mariano 71'

Norman Broaster Stadium, San Ignacio

Toledo Ambassadors were awarded a victory, due to the withdrawal of San Pedro Sea Dogs.

Round 11:

23 December 2010
19:30

Belmopan Blaze	1–6	FC Belize
Bermudez 28'		Davis 9', 45', 48'; Okonkwo 21', 66', 85'

FFB Field, Belmopan

23 December 2010
19:30

San Felipe Barcelona	1–1	Toledo Ambassadors
O. Acebedo 8'		A. Makin Jr. 50'

Orange Walk People's Stadium, Orange Walk Town

23 December 2010
20:00

Hankook Verdes	0–1	BDF
		R. Jimenez 34'

Marshalleck Stadium, Benque Viejo del Carmen

Griga United were awarded a victory, due to the withdrawal of San Pedro Sea Dogs.

=== Playoffs ===
==== Results ====
Quarter-Finals

2 January 2011
16:00

Griga United	2–3	San Felipe Barcelona
Serano 32'; Peters 63'		Benavides 55'; H. Cruz 72'; O. Acebedo 90'

Carl Ramos Stadium, Dangriga

2 January 2011
16:00

Toledo Ambassadors	0–0 (a.e.t.)	Hankook Verdes
Penalties
Garcia (penalty scored); T. Flores (penalty missed); Muschamp (penalty scored); Eiley (penalty scored); Ramirez (penalty scored)	4–2	(penalty scored) Meza; (penalty missed) A. Cano; (penalty missed) Guerra; (penalty scored) Monroy

Toledo Union Field, Punta Gorda

Semi-Finals

Game One:

23 January 2011
16:00

FC Belize	1–1	Toledo Ambassadors
Andrews 1'		Muschamp 63'

MCC Grounds, Belize City

23 January 2011
16:00

San Felipe Barcelona	1–2	BDF
Cawich 81'		Mariano 61'; Cawich O.G 84'

Orange Walk People's Stadium, Orange Walk Town

Game Two:

30 January 2011
16:00

Toledo Ambassadors	3–0	FC Belize
R. Flores 21', 30', 80'

Toledo Union Field, Punta Gorda

(*) Toledo Ambassadors win the series 4 – 1

30 January 2011
16:00

BDF	6–2	San Felipe Barcelona
D. Jimenez 30', 40'; Trapp 36'; Symms 38' (pen.); R. Jimenez 52'; Mariano 82'		H. Cruz 81' (pen.); Wicab 83'

Norman Broaster Stadium, San Ignacio

(*) Belize Defence Force win the series 8 – 3

Championship-Finals

Game One:

6 February 2011
16:00

Toledo Ambassadors	2–2	BDF
D. Makin 8'; R. Flores 24'		R. Jimenez 12'; Flores 73'

Toledo Union Field, Punta Gorda

Game Two:

13 February 2011
16:00

BDF	2–0	Toledo Ambassadors
R. Jimenez 48'; D. Jimenez 87'

Norman Broaster Stadium, San Ignacio

2010–11 Opening season champions

3rd title

=== Top scorers ===
Rank	Scorer	Team	Goals
1	(Nigeria) Christian Okonkwo	FC Belize	11
2	(Belize) Daniel Jimenez	Belize Defence Force	10
3	(Belize) Deris Benavides	San Felipe Barcelona	9
4	(Belize) Jarrett Davis	FC Belize	8
5	(Belize) Ralph Flores	Toledo Ambassadors	7
5	(Belize) Richard Jimenez	Belize Defence Force	7
5	(Belize) Evan Mariano	Belize Defence Force	7
8	(Belize) Leon Jones	Belmopan Blaze	6
9	(Belize) Oscar Acebedo	San Felipe Barcelona	5

Playoff goals are included.

=== Awards ===
On 10 February 2011, the Belize Premier Football League in partnership with league sponsors Caribbean Motors presented the 2010–11 Opening Season Awards.

Award	Recipient	Team
Most Goals	(Nigeria) Christian Okonkwo	FC Belize
MVP (Regular Season)	(Belize) Deris Benavides	San Felipe Barcelona
MVP (Playoff)	(Belize) Richard Jimenez	Belize Defence Force
Best Forward	(Belize) Jarrett Davis	FC Belize
Best Midfielder	(Belize) Deris Benavides	San Felipe Barcelona
Best Defender	(Belize) Vallan Symms	Belize Defence Force
Best Goalkeeper	(Belize) Woodrow West	Belize Defence Force
Rookie	(Belize) Leobardo Mendez	Hankook Verdes
Manager	(Belize) Ian Jones	FC Belize
Coach	(Belize) Andres Makin	Toledo Ambassadors

== BPFL Cup ==
Only four teams from the opening season competed in the BPFL Cup, with the four teams scheduled to play a triple round-robin regular season. The BPFL Cup started on 20 March 2011, with the regular season concluding on 23 April 2011. After Round 7 of the competition it was announced by BPFL Manager Marvin Ottley that the league decided to abort the remaining games of the regular season and go straight to the playoffs.

=== League table ===
Pos	Team	Pld	W	D	L	GF	GA	GD	Pts	Qualification
1	Belize Defence Force	7	4	2	1	18	9	+9	14	Qualification to the Playoffs
2	FC Belize	7	3	2	2	11	10	+1	11	Qualification to the Playoffs
3	San Felipe Barcelona	7	2	2	3	12	21	−9	8	Qualification to the Playoffs
4	Hankook Verdes	7	2	0	5	11	12	−1	6	Qualification to the Playoffs

Updated to match(es) played on 23 April 2011. Source:
Rules for classification: 1) points; 2) goal difference; 3) number of goals scored.

=== Results ===
Round 1:

20 March 2011
16:00

BDF	2–1	Hankook Verdes
D. Jimenez (?); R. Jimenez (?)		Meza (?)

Norman Broaster Stadium, San Ignacio

20 March 2011
16:00

FC Belize	2–0	San Felipe Barcelona
Canul 65'; Ramos 70'

MCC Grounds, Belize City

Round 2:

26 March 2011
20:00

Hankook Verdes	0–1	FC Belize
		Jones (?)

Marshalleck Stadium, Benque Viejo del Carmen

27 March 2011
16:00

San Felipe Barcelona	3–2	BDF
Allen 38', 66'; Morales 59'		Mariano 30'; Flores 34'

San Felipe Football Field, Orange Walk Town

Round 3:

30 March 2011
20:00

BDF	1–0	Hankook Verdes
D. Jimenez (?)

Norman Broaster Stadium, San Ignacio

30 March 2011
20:00

FC Belize	2–2	San Felipe Barcelona
Jones 55'; Thurton 70'		Acebedo 61'; Wicab 63'

MCC Grounds, Belize City

Round 4:

2 April 2011
20:00

FC Belize	1–1	BDF
Andrews 82'		Flores 90+1'

MCC Grounds, Belize City

3 April 2011
16:00

San Felipe Barcelona	3–2	Hankook Verdes
Morales 5'; Cruz 58'; West 59'		Maldonado 44'; Meza 74'

San Felipe Football Field, Orange Walk Town

Round 5:

9 April 2011
20:00

Hankook Verdes	5–1	San Felipe Barcelona
August 24', 83'; Mendez 28'; Maldonado 43'; Meza 88'		Allen 36'

Marshalleck Stadium, Benque Viejo del Carmen

10 April 2011
16:00

BDF	4–1	FC Belize
Mariano 13'; Trapp 65'; R. Jimenez 67'; Own goal (?)		Perez 2'

Norman Broaster Stadium, San Ignacio

Round 6:

17 April 2011
16:00

BDF	7–2	San Felipe Barcelona
Mariano 47', 62'; West 57' (pen.); Lennen 70'; R. Jimenez 72'; Cho 78', 89'		Own goal 4'; Morales 87'

FFB Field, Belmopan

17 April 2011
16:00

FC Belize	4–2	Hankook Verdes
Thurton 9', 46'; Diaz 73'; Usher 90'		Maldonado 56', 58'

FFB Field, Belmopan

Round 7:

21 April 2011
16:00

Hankook Verdes	1–0	FC Belize
Maldonado 48'

Marshalleck Stadium, Benque Viejo del Carmen

23 April 2011
16:00

San Felipe Barcelona	1–1	BDF
West 25'		Mariano 81'

FFB Field, Belmopan

=== Playoffs ===
==== Results ====
Semi-Finals

30 April 2011
19:30

Hankook Verdes	0–3	BDF
		Mariano (?); Casey Jr. (?)

Marshalleck Stadium, Benque Viejo del Carmen

1 May 2011
16:00

San Felipe Barcelona	2–3	FC Belize
West 10', 90'		Usher 16'; Andrews 38'; Garnett 90+'

San Felipe Football Field, Orange Walk Town

Championship-Finals

Game One:

8 May 2011
16:00

FC Belize	N/A	BDF

FFB Field, Belmopan

(*) The Belize Premier Football League withdrew from the Football Federation of Belize and subsequently the league abandoned all remaining games, therefore no winner was crowned.

=== Top scorers ===
Rank	Scorer	Team	Goals
1	(Belize) Evan Mariano	Belize Defence Force	7
2	(Belize) Julian Maldonado	Hankook Verdes	5
3	(Belize) Clifton West	San Felipe Barcelona	4
4	(Belize) Andrew Allen	San Felipe Barcelona	3
4	(Belize) Richard Jimenez	Belize Defence Force	3
4	(Belize) Marlon Meza	Hankook Verdes	3
4	(Belize) Eduardo Morales	San Felipe Barcelona	3
4	(Belize) Gilroy Thurton	FC Belize	3

Playoff goals are included.
