= 2004 UNCAF Interclub Cup =

Tournament details
- Dates: 21 September – 5 December 2004
- Teams: 14 (from 7 associations)

Final positions
- Champions: (Guatemala) Municipal (4th title)
- Runners-up: (Costa Rica) Saprissa

Tournament statistics
- Matches played: 26
- Goals scored: 80 (3.08 per match)

The 2004 UNCAF Interclub Cup was the 22nd edition of the Central American Club Championship and the 6th edition under its current name, UNCAF Interclub Cup. C.S.D. Municipal from Guatemala, lifted its 4th title.

== Qualified teams ==
Association	Team (Berth)	Qualification method	App.
(Belize) Belize; 2 berths	Boca Juniors	2003–04 A League champion	2nd
(Belize) Belize; 2 berths	Kulture Yabra	2003–04 Challenge Champions Cup champion	1st
(Costa Rica) Costa Rica; 2 berths	Herediano	2003–04 Clausura champion	1st
(Costa Rica) Costa Rica; 2 berths	Saprissa	2003–04 Apertura champion	5th
(El Salvador) El Salvador; 2 berths	Alianza	2003–04 Clausura champion	3rd
(El Salvador) El Salvador; 2 berths	FAS	2003–04 Apertura champion	4th
(Guatemala) Guatemala; 2 berths	Cobán Imperial	2003–04 Clausura champion	1st
(Guatemala) Guatemala; 2 berths	Municipal	2003–04 Apertura champion	5th
(Honduras) Honduras; 2 berths	Olimpia	2003–04 Clausura champion	5th
(Honduras) Honduras; 2 berths	Real España	2003–04 Apertura champion	2nd
(Nicaragua) Nicaragua; 2 berths	Diriangén	2003–04 Apertura and Clausura champion	2nd
(Nicaragua) Nicaragua; 2 berths	Real Estelí	2003–04 runner-up	3rd
(Panama) Panama; 2 berths	Plaza Amador	2002 Clausura champion	2nd
(Panama) Panama; 2 berths	Tauro	2003 Apertura champion	3rd

== First round ==
2004-09-21

Kulture Yabra (Belize)	0 – 0	(El Salvador) Alianza

MCC Grounds, Belize City

2004-09-21

Diriangén (Nicaragua)	0 – 2	(El Salvador) FAS

Estadio Cacique Diriangén, Diriamba

2004-09-22

Plaza Amador (Panama)	2 – 1	(Guatemala) Cobán Imperial

Estadio Javier Cruz, Panama City

2004-09-22

Boca Juniors (Belize)	0 – 1	(Honduras) Olimpia

MCC Grounds, Belize City

2004-09-23

Tauro (Panama)	0 – 3	(Costa Rica) Herediano

Estadio Rommel Fernandez, Panama City

2004-09-23

Real Estelí (Nicaragua)	1 – 1	(Honduras) Real España

Estadio Independencia, Estelí

2004-09-28

Cobán Imperial (Guatemala)	3 – 2	(Panama) Plaza Amador

Estadio José Ángel Rossi, Cobán
- Cobán Imperial 4–4 Plaza Amador on aggregate; Plaza Amador advanced on away goals.

2004-09-28

Olimpia (Honduras)	5 – 0	(Belize) Boca Juniors

MCC Grounds, Belize City
- Olimpia won 6–0 on aggregate.

2004-09-29

Herediano (Costa Rica)	3 – 0	(Panama) Tauro

Estadio Eladio Rosabal Cordero, Heredia
- Herediano won 6–0 on aggregate.

2004-09-29

Real España (Honduras)	3 – 3	(Nicaragua) Real Estelí

Estadio Nacional Chelato Uclés, Tegucigalpa
- Real España 4–4 Real Estelí on aggregate; Real Estelí advanced on away goals.

2004-09-30

Alianza (El Salvador)	5 – 2	(Belize) Kulture Yabra

Estadio Cuscatlán, San Salvador
- Alianza won 5–2 on aggregate.

2004-09-30

FAS (El Salvador)	7 – 0	(Nicaragua) Diriangén

Estadio Óscar Quiteño, Santa Ana
- FAS won 9–0 on aggregate.

== Quarterfinals ==
2004-10-19

Alianza (El Salvador)	0 – 1	(Guatemala) Municipal

Estadio Cuscatlán, San Salvador

2004-10-20

FAS (El Salvador)	5 – 2	(Panama) Plaza Amador

Estadio Óscar Quiteño, Santa Ana

2004-10-20

Real Estelí (Nicaragua)	0 – 1	(Costa Rica) Saprissa

Estadio Independencia, Estelí

2004-10-21

Herediano (Costa Rica)	2 – 3	(Honduras) Olimpia

Estadio Eladio Rosabal Cordero, Heredia

2004-10-26

Plaza Amador (Panama)	0 – 1	(El Salvador) FAS

Estadio Rommel Fernandez, Panama City
- FAS won 6–2 on aggregate.

2004-10-27

Municipal (Guatemala)	3 – 1	(El Salvador) Alianza

Estadio Doroteo Guamuch Flores, Guatemala City
- Municipal won 4–1 on aggregate.

2004-10-27

Olimpia (Honduras)	0 – 1	(Costa Rica) Herediano

Estadio Nacional Chelato Uclés, Tegucigalpa
- Olimpia 3–3 Herediano on aggregate; Olimpia advanced on away goals.

2004-10-28

Saprissa (Costa Rica)	4 – 0	(Nicaragua) Real Estelí

Estadio Ricardo Saprissa, San José
- Saprissa won 5–0 on aggregate.

== Final round ==
Matchday One
Municipal	2–0	FAS
Deportivo Saprissa	0–0	Olimpia
Matchday Two
Municipal	0–1	Olimpia
Deportivo Saprissa	3–1	FAS
Matchday Three
Municipal	1–0	Deportivo Saprissa
Olimpia	1–3	FAS

All matches were played at the Estadio Cementos Progreso, Guatemala City.

=== Standings ===
Pos	Team	Pld	W	D	L	GF	GA	GD	Pts	Qualification
1	(Guatemala) Municipal	3	2	0	1	3	2	+1	6	Qualification for 2005 CONCACAF Champions' Cup
2	(Costa Rica) Saprissa	3	1	1	1	3	2	+1	4	Qualification for 2005 CONCACAF Champions' Cup
3	(Honduras) Olimpia	3	1	1	1	2	3	−1	4	Qualification for 2005 CONCACAF Champions' Cup
4	(El Salvador) FAS	3	1	0	2	4	6	−2	3	

Municipal 2004 UNCAF champions

Municipal, Deportivo Saprissa, Olimpia advance to 2005 CONCACAF Champions' Cup quarterfinals.
