= 2011 Super League of Belize =

Super League of Belize
- Season: 2011
- Champions: Placencia Assassin
- Matches: 68
- Goals: 233 (3.43 per match)
- Top goalscorer: Deon McCaulay (29)
- Biggest home win: Orange Walk United 7-1 Hattieville Monarch (7 May 2011)
- Biggest away win: Third World F.C. 0–6 Orange Walk United (17 April 2011); Griga Knights 0–6 Raymond Gentle-City Boys United (21 May 2011)
- Highest scoring: Orange Walk United 7-1 Hattieville Monarch (7 May 2011); Third World F.C. 5–3 Cayo South United (22 May 2011)
- Longest unbeaten run: Raymond Gentle-City Boys United (9)
- Longest winless run: Cayo South United (14)

The 2011 Super League of Belize (also known as the 2011 Belize Bank Super League Tournament) is a football league in Belize, which is not affiliated with the Football Federation of Belize. The league was founded in 2006.

== Teams ==
Team	City	Stadium
Cayo South United	Camalote Village	Camalote Football Field
Griga Knights	Dangriga	Carl Ramos Stadium
Hattieville Monarch	Hattieville	Hattieville Football Field
Orange Walk United	Orange Walk Town	Orange Walk People's Stadium
Paradise/Freedom Fighters	Punta Gorda	Toledo Union Field
Placencia Assassin	Placencia	Placencia Football Field
Raymond Gentle-City Boys United	Belize City	MCC Grounds
Third World F.C.	Belize City	MCC Grounds

== League table ==
Pos	Team	Pld	W	D	L	GF	GA	GD	Pts	Qualification
1	R.G. City Boys United	14	11	1	2	42	15	+27	34	Qualification to the Playoffs
2	Orange Walk United	14	9	1	4	38	14	+24	28	Qualification to the Playoffs
3	Paradise/Freedom Fighters	14	9	0	5	25	16	+9	27	Qualification to the Playoffs
4	Placencia Assassins	14	8	2	4	25	14	+11	26	Qualification to the Playoffs
5	Griga Knights	14	6	2	6	23	29	−6	20	
6	Third World F.C.	14	4	1	9	15	33	−18	13	
7	Hattieville Monarch	14	2	5	7	16	28	−12	11	
8	Cayo South United	14	0	2	12	14	49	−35	2	

Updated to match(es) played on 29 May 2011. Source:
Rules for classification: 1) points; 2) goal difference; 3) number of goals scored.

== Results ==
Round 1:

26 February 2011
19:30

Griga Knights	1 – 1	Hattieville Monarch
Valdez 82'		James 60'

Carl Ramos Stadium, Dangriga

27 February 2011
15:30

Placencia Assassin	3 – 1	Cayo South United
L. Leslie 24'; Donaire 45'; A. Torres 90'		Tamai 6'

Placencia Football Field, Placencia

27 February 2011
15:30

Orange Walk United	0 – 0	Third World F.C.

Orange Walk People's Stadium, Orange Walk Town

27 February 2011
16:00

Raymond Gentle-City Boys United	3 – 0	Paradise/Freedom Fighters
Simpson 3'; McCaulay 30' (pen.), 60'

MCC Grounds, Belize City

Round 2:

5 March 2011
19:30

Griga Knights	2 – 1	Placencia Assassin
Valdez 38'; Jeffery Apolonio 41'		L. Torres 89'

Carl Ramos Stadium, Dangriga

6 March 2011
15:30

Hattieville Monarch	1 – 1	Cayo South United

Hattieville Football Field, Hattieville

6 March 2011
15:30

Orange Walk United	1 – 2	Paradise/Freedom Fighters
O. Hendricks 27'		D. Makin 57'; R. Flores 63'

Orange Walk People's Stadium, Orange Walk Town

6 March 2011
16:00

Third World F.C.	1 – 5	Raymond Gentle-City Boys United
Martinez 59'		McCaulay 11'; Muschamp 19', 44', 57'; Jones 74'

MCC Grounds, Belize City

Round 3:

13 March 2011
15:30

Placencia Assassin	1 – 1	Hattieville Monarch
A. Torres 52'		Usher 29'

Placencia Football Field, Placencia

13 March 2011
15:30

Cayo South United	2 – 5	Griga Knights
W. Wiltshire 71'; Pandy 90+'		Jason Apolonio 19', 59'; Martinez 25', 34'; Arthurs 41'

Camalote Football Field, Camalote Village

13 March 2011
15:30

Paradise/Freedom Fighters	1 – 0	Third World F.C.
R. Flores 69'

Toledo Union Field, Punta Gorda

13 March 2011
16:00

Raymond Gentle-City Boys United	2 – 0	Orange Walk United
Jones 13'; McCaulay 55'

MCC Grounds, Belize City

(*) Game was abandoned at 2 – 0.

Round 4:

19 March 2011
20:00

Third World F.C.	1 – 4	Griga Knights
W. Pierre 21'		Castillo 6'; Valdez 65', 83'; Jeffery Apolonio 78'

MCC Grounds, Belize City

20 March 2011
15:30

Hattieville Monarch	1 – 2	Orange Walk United
Arnold 20'		O. Hendricks 16'; C. Hendricks 78'

Hattieville Football Field, Hattieville

20 March 2011
15:30

Cayo South United	2 – 3	Raymond Gentle-City Boys United
Tamai 10', 67'		McCaulay 19' (pen.), 76'; Cayetano 20'

Camalote Football Field, Camalote Village

23 March 2011
19:30

Paradise/Freedom Fighters	1 – 0	Placencia Assassin
R. Flores 82'

Toledo Union Field, Punta Gorda

Round 5:

26 March 2011
19:30

Griga Knights	3 – 2	Paradise/Freedom Fighters
Jeffery Apolonio 31'; Baladarez 76'; Valdez 81'		R. Flores 2'; D. Flores 55'

Carl Ramos Stadium, Dangriga

27 March 2011
15:30

Placencia Assassin	1 – 2	Raymond Gentle-City Boys United
Eiley 75' (pen.)		McCaulay 55'; Jones 76'

Placencia Football Field, Placencia

27 March 2011
15:30

Orange Walk United	4 – 0	Cayo South United
O. Hendricks 6', 48'; Perez 32'; Chi 53'

Orange Walk People's Stadium, Orange Walk Town

27 March 2011
16:00

Third World F.C.	0 – 4	Hattieville Monarch
		Arnold 22', 32', 38'; James 79'

MCC Grounds, Belize City

Round 6:

3 April 2011
15:30

Placencia Assassin	2 – 3	Orange Walk United
M. Leslie 45'; L. Leslie 64'		C. Hendricks 3'; Castillo 77'; Wade 83'

Placencia Football Field, Placencia

3 April 2011
15:30

Cayo South United	1 – 4	Third World F.C.
O. Wiltshire 89'		Flowers 22'; D. Pierre 38'; Pitts 42'; W. Pierre 88'

Camalote Football Field, Camalote Village

3 April 2011
15:30

Paradise/Freedom Fighters	2 – 1	Hattieville Monarch
Peters 45' (pen.); Roches 48'		Jones 83' (pen.)

Toledo Union Field, Punta Gorda

3 April 2011
16:00

Raymond Gentle-City Boys United	3 – 1	Griga Knights
McCaulay 41', 50' (pen.), 73'		Gentle 52'

MCC Grounds, Belize City

Round 7:

10 April 2011
15:30

Hattieville Monarch	1 – 5	Raymond Gentle-City Boys United
Jones 78' (pen.)		McCaulay 12', 28'; Jones 48', 65'; Gaynair 83'

Hattieville Football Field, Hattieville

10 April 2011
15:30

Cayo South United	1 – 4	Paradise/Freedom Fighters
Coe 85'		T. Flores 12'; A. Makin Jr. 36', 78', 90+1'

Camalote Football Field, Camalote Village

10 April 2011
15:30

Orange Walk United	5 – 0	Griga Knights
Davis 40', 42'; Casanova 64'; Flowers 84', 87'

Orange Walk People's Stadium, Orange Walk Town

10 April 2011
16:00

Third World F.C.	0 – 2	Placencia Assassin
		Z. Torres 6'; A. Torres 90+1'

MCC Grounds, Belize City

Round 8:

17 April 2011
15:30

Hattieville Monarch	1 – 1	Griga Knights
James 19'		Thomas 12'

Hattieville Football Field, Hattieville

17 April 2011
15:30

Cayo South United	0 – 4	Placencia Assassin
		L. Leslie 15', 37'; A. Torres 23'; Eiley 80' (pen.)

Camalote Football Field, Camalote Village

17 April 2011
15:30

Paradise/Freedom Fighters	2 – 3	Raymond Gentle-City Boys United
Peters 29', 85'		Flowers 31'; McCaulay 39', 54'

Toledo Union Field, Punta Gorda

17 April 2011
16:00

Third World F.C.	0 – 6	Orange Walk United
		Castillo 6'; O. Hendricks 16'; Davis 44'; Jesse 75' (pen.); Miranda 87', 88'

MCC Grounds, Belize City

Round 9:

21 April 2011
19:30

Raymond Gentle-City Boys United	3 – 1	Third World F.C.
Cayetano 20'; McCaulay 45', 80'		Pitts 41'

MCC Grounds, Belize City

21 April 2011
19:30

Cayo South United	1 – 1	Hattieville Monarch
O. Wiltshire 26'		James 19'

Camalote Football Field, Camalote Village

23 April 2011
19:30

Paradise/Freedom Fighters	1 – 0	Orange Walk United
A. Makin Jr. 72'

Toledo Union Field, Punta Gorda

23 April 2011
19:30

Placencia Assassin	3 – 1	Griga Knights
A. Torres 72', 81'; Linares 79'		S. Apolonio 85'

Placencia Football Field, Placencia

Round 10:

30 April 2011
19:30

Orange Walk United	3 – 2	Raymond Gentle-City Boys United
O. Hendricks 37', 39'; C. Hendricks 81'		Young 44'; McCaulay 64'

Orange Walk People's Stadium, Orange Walk Town

1 May 2011
15:30

Hattieville Monarch	1 – 3	Placencia Assassin
Arnold 73'		A. Torres 40'; Eiley 64' (pen.); L. Leslie 82'

Hattieville Football Field, Hattieville

1 May 2011
16:00

Third World F.C.	2 – 1	Paradise/Freedom Fighters
Flowers 44'; Eiley 84'		Peters 67'

MCC Grounds, Belize City

4 May 2011
19:30

Griga Knights	2 – 1	Cayo South United
Bermudez 10'; Own goal 73'		O. Wiltshire 57'

Carl Ramos Stadium, Dangriga

Round 11:

7 May 2011
19:30

Griga Knights	3 – 0	Third World F.C.
Valdez 69', 87', 89'

Carl Ramos Stadium, Dangriga

7 May 2011
19:30

Orange Walk United	7 – 1	Hattieville Monarch
Gillett 8'; Own goal 12'; O. Hendricks 25', 72'; C. Hendricks 34'; Davis 84', 87'		James 44'

Orange Walk People's Stadium, Orange Walk Town

8 May 2011
15:30

Placencia Assassin	2 – 0	Paradise/Freedom Fighters
Z. Torres 12'; Linares 43'

Placencia Football Field, Placencia

8 May 2011
16:00

Raymond Gentle-City Boys United	3 – 0	Cayo South United
McCaulay 42'; Cayetano 63', 73'

MCC Grounds, Belize City

Round 12:

15 May 2011
15:30

Paradise/Freedom Fighters	3 – 0	Griga Knights
R. Flores 65'; Peters 77', 85'

Toledo Union Field, Punta Gorda

15 May 2011
15:30

Cayo South United	1 – 6	Orange Walk United
Tamai 6'		O. Hendricks 31', 45', 65'; C. Hendricks 34'; Allen 63'; Davis 64'

Camalote Football Field, Camalote Village

15 May 2011
16:00

Hattieville Monarch	0 – 1	Third World F.C.
		Flowers 66'

Hattieville Football Field, Hattieville

15 May 2011
16:00

Raymond Gentle-City Boys United	1 – 1	Placencia Assassin
McCaulay 5'		A. Torres 50'

MCC Grounds, Belize City

Round 13:

21 May 2011
19:30

Griga Knights	0 – 6	Raymond Gentle-City Boys United
		Jones 5'; McCaulay 28', 34', 36', 77'; Kuylen 87'

Carl Ramos Stadium, Dangriga

21 May 2011
19:30

Orange Walk United	1 – 2	Placencia Assassin
O. Hendricks 78'		Eiley 41' (pen.); A. Torres 89'

Orange Walk People's Stadium, Orange Walk Town

22 May 2011
15:30

Hattieville Monarch	0 – 2	Paradise/Freedom Fighters
		R. Flores 77'; D. Flores 87'

Hattieville Football Field, Hattieville

22 May 2011
16:00

Third World F.C.	5 – 3	Cayo South United
Flowers 38', 49'; Eiley 52', 72'; White 79'		Tamai 5', 74'; Neal 36'

MCC Grounds, Belize City

Round 14:

28 May 2011
19:30

Griga Knights	N/A	Orange Walk United

Carl Ramos Stadium, Dangriga

(*) Griga Knights forfeited the game, therefore Orange Walk United gained the win.

28 May 2011
19:30

Paradise/Freedom Fighters	4 – 0	Cayo South United
D. Makin 19'; Peters 42'; R. Flores 47' (pen.); Lopez 72'

Toledo Union Field, Punta Gorda

29 May 2011
15:30

Placencia Assassin	N/A	Third World F.C.

Placencia Football Field, Placencia

(*) Third World F.C. forfeited the game, therefore Placencia Assassin gained the win.

29 May 2011
16:00

Raymond Gentle-City Boys United	1 – 2	Hattieville Monarch
David McCaulay 19'		Own goal 58'; James 89'

MCC Grounds, Belize City

== Playoffs ==
The playoffs will consist of the top four ranked teams from the regular season; Raymond Gentle-City Boys United, Orange Walk United, Paradise/Freedom Fighters and Placencia Assassin. The teams will play each other twice. The top two ranked teams will play a best of three Championship final series, with the winner being crowned as Champions.

== League table ==
Pos	Team	Pld	W	D	L	GF	GA	GD	Pts	Qualification
1	Placencia Assassins	6	3	1	2	7	7	0	10	Qualification to the Championship Finals
2	R.G. City Boys United	6	3	0	3	11	7	+4	9	Qualification to the Championship Finals
3	Paradise/Freedom Fighters	6	2	2	2	4	6	−2	8	
4	Orange Walk United	6	2	1	3	7	9	−2	7	

Updated to match(es) played on 10 July 2011. Source:
Rules for classification: 1) points; 2) goal difference; 3) number of goals scored.

== Results ==
Round 1:

5 June 2011
15:30

Orange Walk United	1 – 0	Paradise/Freedom Fighters
C. Hendricks 87'

Orange Walk People's Stadium, Orange Walk Town

5 June 2011
16:00

Raymond Gentle-City Boys United	3 – 0	Placencia Assassin
Gaynair 13'; McCaulay 39', 68'

MCC Grounds, Belize City

Round 2:

12 June 2011
15:30

Placencia Assassin	2 – 1	Orange Walk United
Eiley 14' (pen.); A. Torres 54'		Davis ?'

Placencia Football Field, Placencia

12 June 2011
16:00

Paradise/Freedom Fighters	1 – 0	Raymond Gentle-City Boys United
Peters ?'

Toledo Union Field, Punta Gorda

Round 3:

19 June 2011
15:30

Paradise/Freedom Fighters	1 – 0	Placencia Assassin
Peters 55' (pen.)

Toledo Union Field, Punta Gorda

19 June 2011
16:00

Raymond Gentle-City Boys United	4 – 0	Orange Walk United
McCaulay 22', 79'; Muschamp 29'; Simpson 72'

MCC Grounds, Belize City

Round 4:

25 June 2011
19:30

Orange Walk United	5 – 1	Raymond Gentle-City Boys United
Davis 1', 17', 54'; C. Hendricks 9'; Diaz 67'		Cayetano 83'

Orange Walk People's Stadium, Orange Walk Town

25 June 2011
19:30

Placencia Assassin	2 – 2	Paradise/Freedom Fighters
Garcia 23'; Eiley 65' (pen.)		R. Flores 20'; T. Flores 90+'

Placencia Football Field, Placencia

Round 5:

3 July 2011
15:30

Orange Walk United	0 – 2	Placencia Assassin
		Garcia 18'; Z. Torres 37'

Orange Walk People's Stadium, Orange Walk Town

3 July 2011
16:00

Raymond Gentle-City Boys United	3 – 0	Paradise/Freedom Fighters
Jones 47'; McCaulay 61'; Cayetano 65'

MCC Grounds, Belize City

Round 6:

10 July 2011
16:00

Paradise/Freedom Fighters	0 – 0	Orange Walk United

Toledo Union Field, Punta Gorda

10 July 2011
16:00

Placencia Assassin	1 – 0	Raymond Gentle-City Boys United
L. Torres 30'

Placencia Football Field, Placencia

== Championship final Series ==
Game 1:

24 July 2011
16:00

Raymond Gentle-City Boys United	1 – 2	Placencia Assassin
Kuylen 56'		Garcia 36'; Hitchcock 90+1'

MCC Grounds, Belize City

Game 2:

30 July 2011
19:30

Placencia Assassin	2 – 1	Raymond Gentle-City Boys United
A. Torres 4'; Garcia 48'		McCaulay 63' (pen.)

Michael Ashcroft Stadium, Independence

2011 Super League champions
Placencia Assassin
1st title

== Top scorers ==
Rank	Scorer	Team	Goals
1	(Belize) Deon McCaulay	Raymond Gentle-City Boys United	29
2	(Belize) Oliver Hendricks	Orange Walk United	13
3	(Belize) Ashley Torres	Placencia Assassin	11
4	(Belize) Jarret Davis	Orange Walk United	10
5	(Belize) Alexander Peters	Paradise/Freedom Fighters	9
6	(Belize) Ralph Flores	Paradise/Freedom Fighters	8
6	(Belize) Leonard Valdez	Griga Knights	8
8	(Belize) Christopher Hendricks	Orange Walk United	7
8	(Belize) Leon Jones	Raymond Gentle-City Boys United	7

(*) Please note playoff goals are included.

== Hat-tricks ==
Player	For	Against	Result	Date
(Belize) Tyrone Muschamp	Raymond Gentle-City Boys United	Third World F.C.	5–1	6 March 2011
(Belize) Albert Arnold	Hattieville Monarch	Third World F.C.	4–0	27 March 2011
(Belize) Deon McCaulay	Raymond Gentle-City Boys United	Griga Knights	3–1	3 April 2011
(Belize) Andres Makin Jr.	Paradise/Freedom Fighters	Cayo South United	4–1	10 April 2011
(Belize) Leonard Valdez	Griga Knights	Third World F.C.	3–0	7 May 2011
(Belize) Oliver Hendricks	Orange Walk United	Cayo South United	6–1	15 May 2011
(Belize) Deon McCaulay^{4}	Raymond Gentle-City Boys United	Griga Knights	6–0	21 May 2011
(Belize) Jarret Davis	Orange Walk United	Raymond Gentle-City Boys United	5–1	25 June 2011

- ^{4} Player scored 4 goals

== Awards ==
After the second Championship Final game, awards were distributed by the league.

Award	Recipient	Team
Most Goals	(Belize) Deon McCaulay	Raymond Gentle-City Boys United
MVP (Regular Season)	(Belize) Deon McCaulay	Raymond Gentle-City Boys United
MVP (Playoff)	(Belize) Stephen Lopez	Placencia Assassin
Best Forward	(Belize) Deon McCaulay	Raymond Gentle-City Boys United
Best Midfielder	(Belize) Andres Makin Jr.	Paradise/Freedom Fighters
Best Defender	(Belize) Dalton Eiley	Placencia Assassin
Best Goalkeeper	(Belize) Stanley Reneau	Raymond Gentle-City Boys United
Manager	(Belize) Raul Rosado	Orange Walk United
Coach	(Belize) John Pollard	Raymond Gentle-City Boys United

== See also ==
- Super League of Belize
- 2008 Super League of Belize season
