= Royal Belize =

Island in Belize

Coordinates: 16.8513°N 88.1307°W

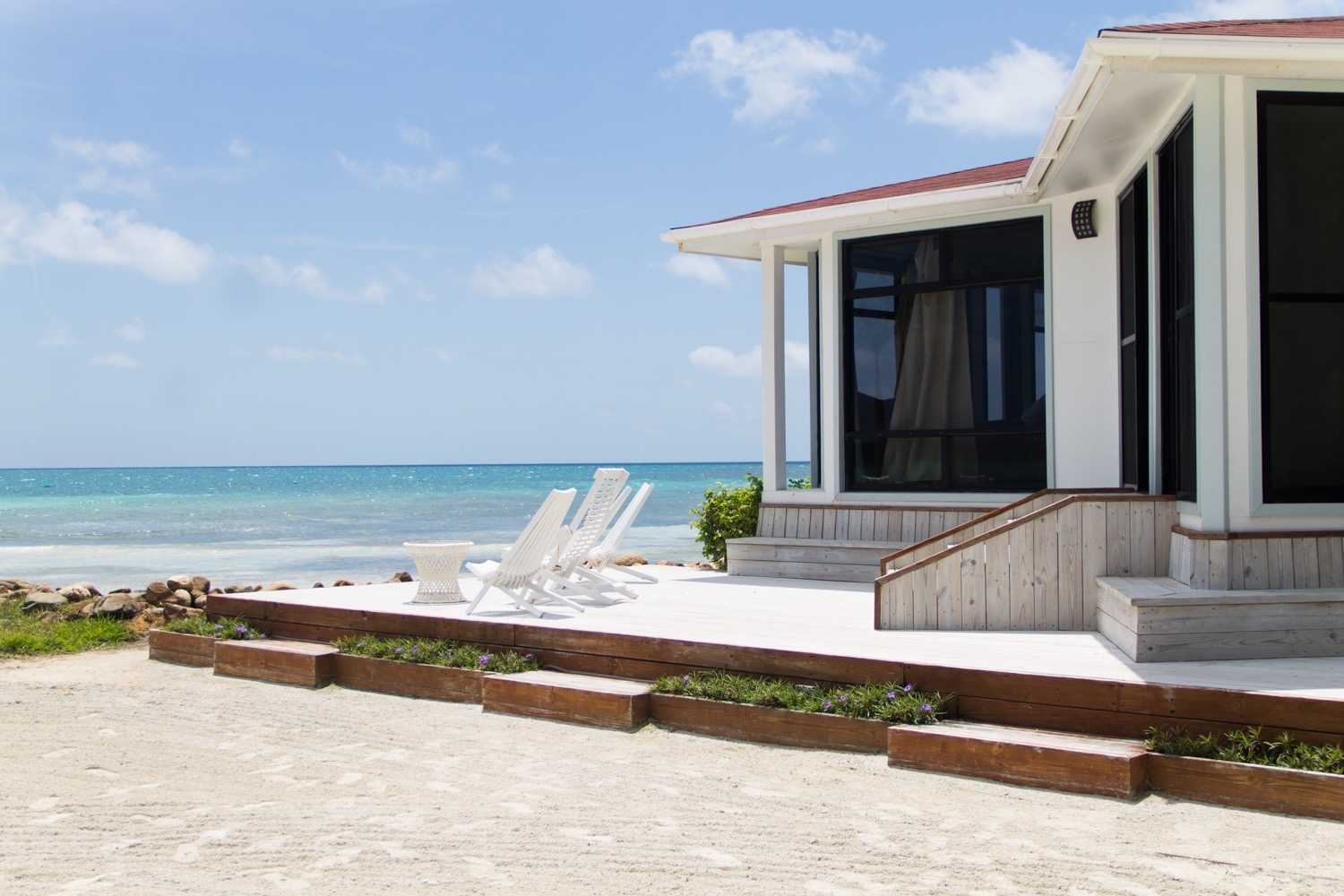
Royal Belize Beach Resort

Royal Belize is a private island off the coast of Belize. It is a 7.5 acre island resort managed by Muy'Ono that was originally developed as a private retreat.

It is the only luxury private island in Belize rented to one guest party at a time. The island is located in the South Water Caye Marine Reserve, approximately nine miles southeast of Dangriga. Royal Belize has five bedrooms that can accommodate up to ten adults in three air conditioned villas. The white house, called Alba, pink house and yellow house. There is a bunk room with space for an additional six children.

A full-time staff of seven lives on the island to cook, clean, serve, guide and care for guests. There is also an island pet named "Iggy" which is short for iguana.

Royal Belize is partnered with the G2G Collection (Getaway2Give), the world's only philanthropic luxury destination club, in support of non-profit organizations.

The owner of the island is Mr. Bill Poston and Mrs. Richele Poston. The island manager is Joe Budna, part of Muy'Ono Resorts, a prominent resort management company in Belize. The island does not allow plastic materials, including plastic straws, and derives much of its power from solar energy.

== Geography ==
Royal Belize is roughly 30 km off the coast of Belize near the town of Dangriga. Most visitors take a 25-minute boat ride from Dangriga. Additionally, some come from Tobacco Caye located northeast of the island of Thatch Caye, located two miles to the north. Like mainland Belize, Royal Belize enjoys a tropical climate with pronounced wet and dry seasons.
