= 2008 Super League of Belize season =

The 2008 season of the Super League of Belize began on October 21, 2007 and will conclude in early 2008. This is its first semiprofessional season, with nine teams.

== League table ==
Pos	Team	Pld	W	L	D	GF	GA	GD	Pts
1	Texmar Boys (Mango Creek/Independence)	4	4	0	0	11	0	+11	12
2	Kraal Road F.C. (Belize City)	5	4	1	0	14	2	+12	12
3	Benque D.C. United (Benque Viejo del Carmen)	5	3	1	1	7	5	+2	10
4	Alpha Barcelona (Orange Walk)	4	2	2	0	5	5	0	6
5	Estrellas F.C. (Punta Gorda)	4	2	2	0	4	4	0	6
6	Roots F.C. (Belize City)	5	1	2	2	8	12	−4	5
7	Barrio Fino F.C. (Belmopan)	4	1	2	1	8	5	+3	4
8	Belmopan Bandits (Belmopan)	4	1	3	0	3	10	−7	3
9	Cayo Adventurers (San Ignacio)	5	0	5	0	3	20	−17	0

== Results/Fixtures ==
=== Week 1 ===
October 20:

- Michael Ashcroft Stadium: Tex Mar 4-0 Bandits. A. Torres 7', 49', 76'; G. Palacio 17'.
- MCC: Kraal Road 0-1 Alpha. H. Cruz 83'.

October 21:

- MCC: Roots 2-2 Barrio Fino. R. Smith 8', 31'-D. Smith' 3, C. Simmons 11'.
- Marshalleck Stadium: Benque 2-1 Adventurers. E. Carrillo 58', H. Cano 90'-B. Wiltshire 36'.

Bye: Estrellas F.C.

=== Week 2 ===
October 27:

- MCC: Roots 1-1 Benque. M. Francis 82'- G. Enriquez 44'.

October 28:

- Isidoro Beaton: Bandits 1-4 Kraal Road. C. Moody 87' (pen.)- R. Gentle 40' 80', N. Nunez 73', L. Diaz 80'. Sent off: S. Reneau, GK-Kraal Road, 86'.
- Toledo Union: Estrellas 0-2 Tex Mar. A. Torres 39', 58'.
- Norman Broaster: Adventurers 1-6 Barrio Fino: E. Polido 22'- A. Logan 13', 36'; J. Jones 60', 63'; G. Montejo 79', 86'. Sent off: A. Morgan, 87'.

Bye: Alpha Barcelona.

=== Week 3 ===
November 3:

- MCC: Kraal Road 4-0 Adventurers.

D. Andrews 55', 57', 59'; L. Diaz 72'.

- Isidoro Beaton: Barrio Fino 0-1 Estrellas.

D. Makin 36'. November 4:

- Marshalleck Stadium: Benque 0-2 Tex Mar.

B. Linarez 36', P. Linarez 84'.

- People's Stadium: Alpha 4-0 Roots.

O. Acevedo 28', E. Cruz 37', C. Cawich 58', O. Sandoval 73'. Bye: Belmopan Bandits.

=== Week 4 ===
November 10:

- 7:30 PM CST, Michael Ashcroft Stadium: Tex Mar Boys 3-0 Alpha Barcelona. H. Jimenez 24', R. Muschamp 60', B. Linarez 88'.
- 7:30 PM CST, Isidoro Beaton Stadium: Belmopan Bandits 1-2 Benque D.C. United. D. Reyes 44'-H. Cano 10', F. Aldana 38'.
- 8:00 PM CST, MCC Grounds: Roots F.C. 0-5 Kraal Road F.C. L. Jones 8'; R. Gentle 27', 65', 75'; N. Nunez 60'.

November 11:

- 4:00 PM CST, Norman Broaster Stadium: Adventurers 1-3 Estrellas F.C. A. Saldivar 37'-R. Flores 23'; D. Makin 58'; D. Hines 89'.

Bye: Barrio Fino F.C.

=== Week 5 ===
November 17:

- Isidoro Beaton: Barrio Fino 0-1 Belmopan Bandits
- MCC: Roots 5-0 Adventurers

November 18:

- Toledo Union: Estrellas 0-1 Kraal Road
- People's Stadium: Alpha 0-2 Benque D.C. United

Bye: Tex Mar Boys.

=== Week 6 ===
November 24:

- MCC: Kraal Road 0-2 Tex Mar Boys. Robert Muschamp 65, 69.
- Isidoro Beaton: Belmopan Bandits 0-2 Estrellas

November 25:

- Marshalleck Stadium: Benque 1-3 Barrio Fino
- People's Stadium: Alpha 0-1 Adventurers

Bye: Roots F.C.

=== Week 7 ===
- December 1: Texmar 3-0 Roots
- December 2: Barrio Fino 2-1 Kraal Road; Estrellas 3-1 Alpha; Bandits 6-1 Adventurers.

=== Week 8 ===
- December 8:
- MCC: Roots 1-2 Bandits. Ronald Usher 1'-Alden Coleman 14', 69'
- Norman Broaster: Adventurers 0-10 Tex Mar. Henry Jimenez 3'; Ashley Torres 4', 80', 85', 90+'; Marco Soto 24'; Paul Linarez 36', 39', 50', 56'.
- December 9:
- Marshalleck: Benque 1-3 Estrellas. Albert Eiley 54'-Ray Arzu 15'; Evon Lino 69'; Delroy Flores 89'.
- People's Stadium: Alpha 0-3 Barrio Fino. Amin August 26'; Gerald Montejo 62'; Andre Logan 75'.

=== Week 9 ===
December 15:

- 19:30, MCC: Kraal Road-Benque United
- 19:30, Isidoro Beaton: Bandits-Alpha
- 20:00, Michael Ashcroft: Tex Mar-Barrio Fino

December 16:

- 15:30, Union Field: Estrellas-Roots.

== Season Statistics ==
=== Scoring ===
- First goal of season: Ashley Torres (7 minutes) for Tex Mar Boys against Belmopan Bandits, October 20.
- Fastest goal (match): Ashley Torres (7 minutes) for Tex Mar Boys against Belmopan Bandits, October 20.
- Goal scored, latest point (match): Habib Cano for Benque D.C. United against Adventurers, October 21 (90 minutes).
- Widest winning margin: Barrio Fino F.C. (5 goals), 6-1 vs. Adventurers, October 28.
- Most goals (match, combined): 7 goals, Barrio Fino (6) and Adventurers (1), October 28.
- First hat-trick: Ashley Torres (Tex Mar Boys), October 20 vs. Belmopan Bandits.
- First own-goal: none.

=== Infractions ===
- First yellow card: none.
- First red card: Stanley Reneau for Kraal Road F.C. against Belmopan Bandits, October 27.

== Goals ==
- 9 goals: Ashley Torres, Tex Mar Boys
- 3 goals: Delroy Andrews and Lorenzo Diaz, Kraal Road.
- 2 goals: Rupert Smith, Roots. Raymond Gentle, Kraal Road. Andres Logan, Jeffrey Jones and Gerald Montejo, Barrio Fino.
- 1 goals: Gilmore Palacio, Bernard Linarez and Paul Linarez, Tex Mar Boys. Harvey Cruz, Oscar Acevedo, Everardo Cruz, Carlos Cawich and Otoniel Sandoval, Alpha. Dudley Smith and Cyril Simmons, Barrio Fino. Esvin Carrillo, Habib Cano, Gomer Enriquez, Benque. Brandon Wiltshire and Everaldo Pulido, Adventurers. Maurice Francis, Roots. Colin Moody, Bandits. Norman Nunez, Kraal Road. Devon Makin, Estrellas.

== Teams ==
Team name	Established	Home stadium
Alpha Barcelona	2006	Orange Walk People's Stadium, Orange Walk Town
Barrio Fino F.C.	2006	Isidoro Beaton Stadium, Belmopan
Belmopan Bandits	1986	Isidoro Beaton Stadium, Belmopan
Benque D.C. United	2000's	Edmund Marshalleck Stadium, Benque Viejo del Carmen
Cayo Adventurers	2007	Norman Broaster Stadium, San Ignacio
Estrellas F.C.	2005	Toledo Union Field, Punta Gorda
Kraal Road F.C. (Forever Strong)	2007	MCC Grounds, Belize City
Roots F.C.	2007	MCC Grounds, Belize City
Tex Mar Boys	2006	Michael Ashcroft Stadium, Mango Creek

== See also ==
- Super League of Belize
- 2011 Super League of Belize
