= Thatch Caye =

- Interactive map of Thatch Caye

Geography
- Coordinates: 16°52′28.3″N 88°07′17.7″W

Administration
- Belize

Thatch Caye is an island in Belize, located 9 miles (14 km) off of the coast of Dangriga, about two miles from the Belize Barrier Reef. The 11 acres (4.5 ha) island is near Southwater Caye, Tobacco Caye, Cocoplum Caye, and Fantasy Caye and South Water Caye Marine Reserve.

The island is home to five locals, according to the 2012 census, and is a tourist destination. Thatch Caye Resort is a resort managed by Muy'Ono located on the island that limits occupancy to no more than 30 people.

The name Thatch Caye originated from island co-owner Travis Holub, who built each residence with thatched roofs. Each of the five thatched-roof structures stand high over the water, making them over-the-water bungalows.
