= Drums of Our Fathers Monument =

Coordinates: 16°57′36″N 88°13′15″W

- Location: George Price Drive, Dangriga
- Designer: Stephen Okeke
- Type: Public Monument
- Completion date: 2004
- Dedicated to: Garinagu

The Drums of Our Fathers Monument, located at the entrance of Dangriga, Stann Creek, Belize, is a monument designed by the Nigerian sculptor Stephen Okeke, honoring Garifuna history, culture and its beliefs.

== Description ==
The monument is currently located at the entrance of Dangriga, Stann Creek, at a roundabout on George Price formerly recognized the Y Park. Dangriga is generally referred to the Garifuna capital of Belize. The sculpture, entitled "Drums of Our Fathers", consists of three dügü drums and a pair of sísira which demonstrates the importance of the Garifuna culture. The three drums represent the past, the present and the future of the Garifuna people throughout Belize. Drums, traditionally used in Garifuna ritual and religious ceremony, are the most important musical instrument to the Garifuna people. The largest drum, lanigi garawoun, the heart drum at the centre of the monument, rests on the other two smaller ones represents the present life. The sísiras or the calabash rattle, on the other hand, are very significant in popular Garifuna music.

== History ==
The monument, created by Stephen Okeke, was made possible by Minister of Defense, Sylvia Flores, at the time, and the Dangriga Town council in 2004. Hon. Sylvia Flores had a vision of the monument and struggled to ensure that it was at the entrance of Dangriga, referred culture capital of Belize. However, the monument was inspired by Mr. Roy Cayetano’s poem, "Drums of Our Fathers".

== Significance ==
The bronze monument, Drums of Our Fathers, was erected to honour and commemorate the history, beliefs and culture of the Garifuna people throughout the country of Belize. The musical instruments on the sculpture represents the past, present and future of the Garifuna culture and are generally used in the popular Garifuna music and celebrations.
