= Roberto Fernandes (footballer, born 1971) =

Indian footballer (born 1971)

Personal information
- Date of birth: 2 November 1971 (age 54)
- Place of birth: Goa, India
- Height: 1.80 m (5 ft 11 in)
- Position: Defender

Senior career*
| Years | Team | Apps | (Gls) |
| 1991–1993 | Salcete | | |
| 1993–1995 | Churchill Brothers | | |
| 1995–1997 | Salgaocar | 58 | (1) |
| 1997–1998 | Atlético Morelia | | |
| 1998 | Monterrey | | |
| 1997–2000 | Salgaocar | | |
| 2000–2001 | San Pedro Seahawks | | |
| 2001–2006 | Salgaocar | | |
| 2006–2007 | Vasco | | |

International career
| 1996–2003 | India | 29 | (0) |
- * Club domestic league appearances and goals

Roberto Fernandes (born 2 November 1971) is an Indian former professional footballer who played as a defender. He appeared in 29 international matches for India national team. Fernandes spent his majority of career by playing for Goan club Salgaocar FC.

He has also played for other Goan clubs such as Churchill Brothers S.C. and Vasco SC. Fernandes has represented India in tournaments like 1998 Asian Games.

== Club career ==
=== Early years ===
Fernandes began his professional club career in 1991, at Salcete FC, that participated in the Goa First Division. He later moved to Goan giants Churchill Brothers and Salgaocar, with whom he spent most of his times.

=== Churchill Brothers ===
On 1 July 1993, he signed with Churchill Brothers and appeared in the Goa Professional League.

=== Salgaocar ===
In July 1995, he moved to Salgaocar and played under managers like Shabbir Ali, Leopold Fernandez.

=== Clubs in Mexico ===
On 1 July 1997, Fernandes moved abroad and signed with Mexican Primera División club Atlético Morelia. He later joined C.F. Monterrey in January 1998.

=== Back in Salgaocar ===
After rejoining Salgaocar, Fernandes was part of the team that emerged as one of the strongest sides in India as they clinched 1998–99 National Football League, 1997 Indian Federation Cup, 1998 and 1999 editions of Indian Super Cup.

=== San Pedro Seahawks ===
In 2000, he again moved abroad and appeared with the Belize Premier Football League side San Pedro Seahawks, on loan transfer from Salgaocar.

== International career ==
Fernandes debuted for India national team on 21 September 1996 against Philippines in a 1998 FIFA World Cup qualification match, that ended as 2–0 win for them. He later appeared in SAFF Gold Cup and helped the team winning trophies in 1997 and 1999. He was also in the national squad and played in 2000 AFC Asian Cup qualification matches but did not move on to final round.

Fernandes was included in the squad of Syed Nayeemuddin managed national team that participated in 1998 Asian Games in Bangkok. Their journey ended after finishing bottom of the second round. In July 2000, Fernandes was included in Sukhwinder Singh managed India national squad for their historic England-tour, where they played three matches against English Premier League sides Fulham, West Bromwich Albion, and arch-rival Bangladesh.

With India, he appeared in the 2002 World Cup Qualifiers, where they defeated teams like United Arab Emirates, Brunei and Yemen. India secured 11 points from 6 matches, same as Yemen, but finished behind them due to an inferior goal difference. In that year, Fernandes was part of Bhaichung Bhutia led Indian team that lifted the LG Cup, in which they defeated host nation Vietnam 3–2. In August 2002, he was called up to the national squad for 2003 Afro-Asian Games, and appeared in the tournament, in which India finished as runners-up behind Uzbekistan.

== Managerial career ==
After retiring, Fernandes went on to became football manager and succeeded Norbert Gonsales as head coach of NFL side Vasco in midway of the league season in 2007.

== Honours ==
Salgaocar

- National Football League: 1998–99
- Goa Professional League: 1998, 2002, 2003, 2004
- Federation Cup: 1997
- Indian Super Cup: 1998, 1999

India

- SAFF Gold Cup: 1997, 1999; third place: 2003
- South Asian Games Bronze medal: 1999
- LG Cup: 2002

Goa

- Santosh Trophy runner-up: 1998–99

== See also ==
- Goans in football
- List of Indian football players in foreign leagues
- List of India national football team captains

== Bibliography ==
- Dineo, Paul; Mills, James (2001). Soccer in South Asia: Empire, Nation, Diaspora. London, United Kingdom: Frank Cass Publishers. p. 36. ISBN 978-0-7146-8170-2. Archived from the original on 25 July 2022.
