= Christian Okonkwo =

Nigerian footballer

Personal information
- Place of birth: Nigeria
- Position: Striker

Senior career*
Years	Team	Apps	(Gls)
2007	North East Stars F.C.		
2010	FC Belize		(11)

Managerial career
- 2025–2026: Calabar Rovers
- * Club domestic league appearances and goals

Christian Okonkwo is a Nigerian football coach and former player, who played for FC Belize in 2010.

== Playing career ==
Okonkwo played for FC Belize of the Belize Premier Football League, one of the predecessors to the Premier League of Belize. He was top scorer of the 2010 season, recording 11 goals with 3 scored in the last round in a 6-1 win over Belmopan Blaze in the 21st, 66th and 85th minutes.

== Coaching career ==
In August 2025, Okonkwo became the head coach of Calabar Rovers, having previously worked as assistant coach of Solution FC, based in Awka. His tenure lasted until February 2026, when he stepped down, citing personal safety concerns.
