= Benque D.C. United =

Belizean football club

Benque Viejo D.C. United
- Full name: Benque Viejo D.C. United
- Founded: 2000
- Ground: Edmund Marshalleck Stadium; Benque Viejo del Carmen, Belize
- Capacity: 2,000
- Chairman: Hector Marshall
- Manager: Colin Gayoso
- League: Belize Premier Football League
Home colours	Away colours

Benque Viejo del Carmen United is a Belizean football team which currently competes in the Belize Premier Football League. The Team is based in the western town of Benque Viejo del Carmen. Their home stadium is Edmund Marshalleck Stadium.

== History ==
The team was founded in July, 2004 as Benque Viejo Del Carmen UNITED and has not been affiliated to Benque FC which played in the Cayo First Division. During the 2005–06 season, Benque DC UNITED competed in the RFG Insurance Cup and in 2008 they played in the Super League of Belize, in the semi-professional division, placed first in the inaugural marathon and second in the tournament finals. It was the brain child and effort of one town resident who chooses to remain anonymous. Currently they are reorganizing with young players and are known as DC YOUTH. Plans are to compete in the Super League of Belize in the very near future.

== Current squad ==
Note: Flags indicate national team as defined under FIFA eligibility rules; some limited exceptions apply. Players may hold more than one non-FIFA nationality.

No.	Pos.	Nation	Player
1	GK	BLZ	Jaime Guerra
—	MF	BLZ	Miguel Aguilar
—	FW	GUA	Nerix Lucero
—	MF	BLZ	Elias Donaire
—	MF	GUA	Alex Alcantara
—	MF	CAN	Michael Wendling
—	DF	BLZ	Allan Ponce
—	DF	BLZ	Victor Enriquez

No.	Pos.	Nation	Player
—	FW	BLZ	Brandon Guzman
—	FW	BLZ	Albert Eiley
—	DF	BLZ	Freddy Cruz
—	MF	BLZ	Julio Ayala
—	DF	BLZ	Nelson Penados
—	FW	BLZ	Marco Ayala
—	DF	BLZ	Mark Guzman
