= Pickstock Lake FC =

Belizean football club

Pickstock Lake
- Full name: Pickstock Lake Football Club
- Founded: 2006
- Ground: MCC Grounds; Belize City, Belize
- Capacity: 7,500
- Manager: Leslie Guild
- League: Belize Premier Football League
Home colours	Away colours

Pickstock Lake FC is a Belizean football team which currently competes in the Belize Premier Football League (BPFL) of the Football Federation of Belize.

The team is based in Belize City. Their home stadium is MCC Grounds.
