= San Pedro Seahawks =

Belizean football club

The San Pedro Seahawks, formerly the Turquoise, are a professional football team in Belize based in Belize City. They currently play in and have won the Belize Premier Football League, which was formerly the top tier league in the country. Players include defender Jarbi Alvarez, who represents the country nationally. Former India international Roberto Fernandez also appeared with the club from 2000 to 2001.

== Ownership ==
According to The San Pedro Sun in 2004, San Pedro's semi-professional soccer team (San Pedro Seahawks) was went under new ownership. In an interview with Mr. Carlos Jex, Director of Finance at the Medical University of the Americas – Belize (MUAB), stated that he and MUAB President Dr. Jeffrey Sersland were the co-owners of the team.

== List of coaches ==
- (Belize) Marvin Ottley (2005)

== See also ==
- List of football clubs in Belize
