= New Site Erei =

Belizean football club

New Site Erei was a Belizean football team competing in the Belize Premier Football League (BPFL) of the Football Federation of Belize.

The Team was based in Dangriga. Their home stadium is Carl Ramos Stadium.

The club was founded in 2002.

== Achievements ==
- Belize Premier League
  - Champions (3): 2002–03, 2005–06, 2006
