= Tobacco Caye =

Island in Belize

Coordinates: 16°53′54″N 88°3′43″W

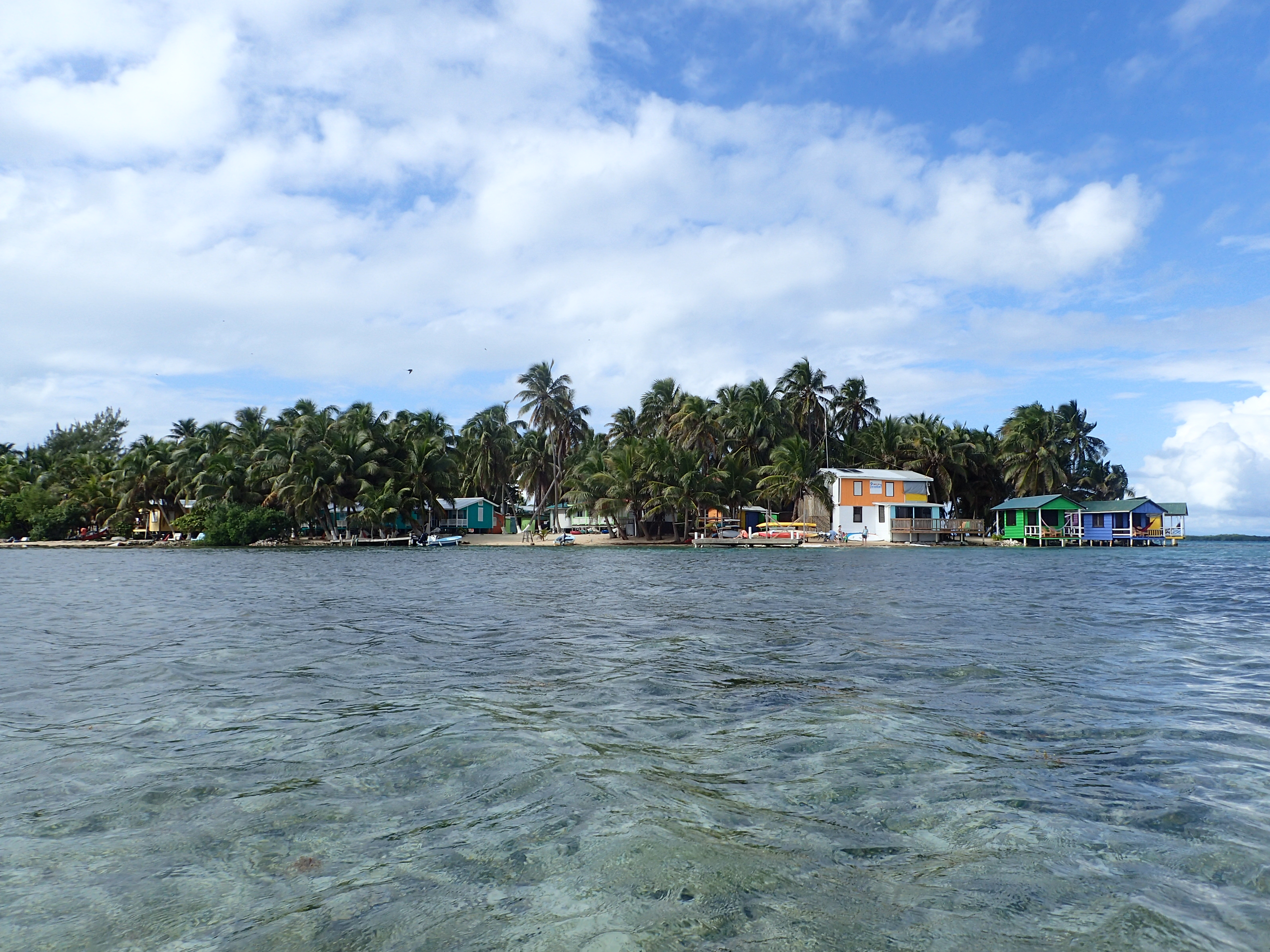
Tobacco Caye

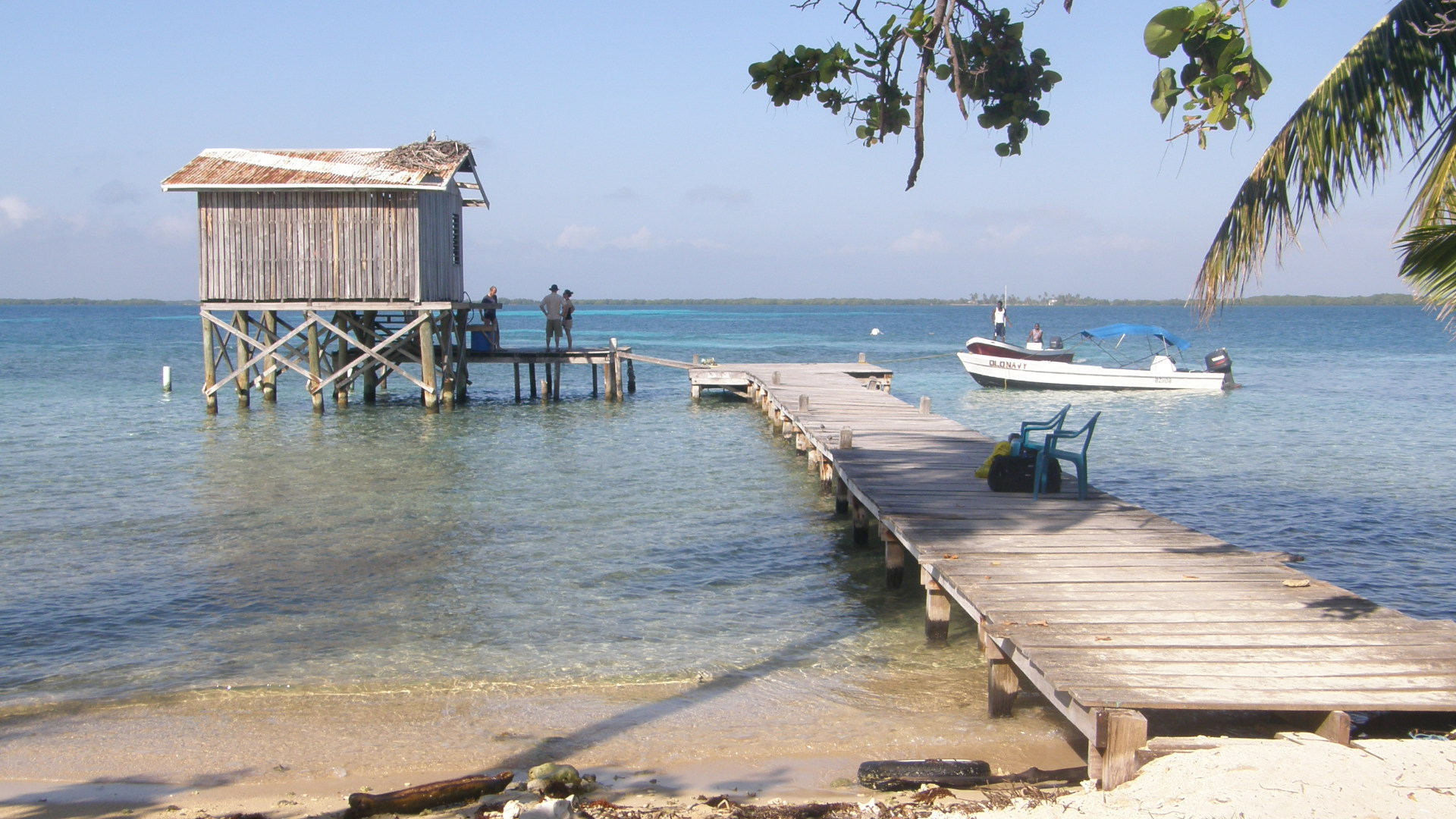
Dock in Tobacco Caye

Tobacco Caye

Tobacco Caye is a tiny island in Belize, about 10 miles (16 kilometres) east of Dangriga.

It is approximately three acres (1.2 hectares) in area, shaped like a yam, with a north-south dimension of about 240 m (260 yd) and an east-west dimension of 125 metres (137 yards). It has a permanent population of about 20, and sees a regular stream of travelers thanks to the five small lodges on the island.

Tobacco Caye lies within the South Water Caye Marine Reserve, part of Belize's national system of protected waters, with a range of restrictions on fishing.

== History ==
The island is believed to have been named for the early cultivation of tobacco there.

The earliest known European chart to indicate Tobacco Caye was by the British geographer J. Speer in 1771.

The island was ravaged by Hurricane Mitch in 1998 but has since been rebuilt.

The island also features Tobacco Caye Marine Station, a study-abroad education centre focusing on the marine environment around Tobacco Caye. The station also gives information to tourists and runs night snorkels and educational lectures.
