= Gabriel Pérez =

Uruguayan footballer (born 1995)

Personal information
- Full name: Gabriel Pérez Ramallo
- Date of birth: 29 March 1995 (age 31)
- Place of birth: Colonia del Sacramento, Uruguay
- Height: 1.80 m (5 ft 11 in)
- Position: Midfielder

Senior career*
Years	Team	Apps	(Gls)
2016–2020	Montevideo Wanderers	20	(0)
2019	→ Central Español (loan)	5	(0)
- * Club domestic league appearances and goals as of 21:22, 6 June 2021 (UTC)

Gabriel Pérez Ramallo (born 29 March 1995) is a Uruguayan footballer who plays as a midfielder.

== Career ==
Pérez began his senior career with Montevideo Wanderers, making his debut for the club on 12 March 2017, coming on as an 81st-minute substitute for Adrián Colombino in a 2-1 defeat to El Tanque Sisley. In August 2019, he was loaned out to then-Uruguayan Segunda División club Central Español. He would make five appearances during his five-month loan spell, and was released by Montevideo Wanderers prior to the 2020 season.

== Career statistics ==
=== Club ===
As of match played 19 October 2019

Appearances and goals by club, season and competition
Club	Season	League			Cup		Continental (Note: Includes appearance in the Copa Sudamericana)		Other		Total	
Club	Season	Division	Apps	Goals	Apps	Goals	Apps	Goals	Apps	Goals	Apps	Goals
Montevideo Wanderers	2016	Uruguayan Primera División	0	0	—	—	0	0	—	—	0	0
Montevideo Wanderers	2017	Uruguayan Primera División	17	0	—	—	0	0	—	—	17	0
Montevideo Wanderers	2018	Uruguayan Primera División	0	0	—	—	—	—	—	—	0	0
Montevideo Wanderers	2019	Uruguayan Primera División	3	0	—	—	1	0	—	—	4	0
Montevideo Wanderers	Total		20	0	—	—	1	0	—	—	21	0
Central Español (loan)	2019	Uruguayan Segunda División	5	0	—	—	—	—	—	—	5	0
Career total			25	0	—	—	1	0	—	—	26	0
