= Christopher Hendricks =

American politician

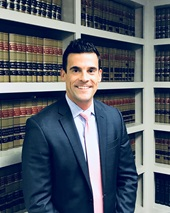

Member of the Massachusetts House of Representatives from the 11th Bristol district
- Incumbent
- Assumed office January 2, 2019
- Preceded by: Robert Koczera

Personal details
- Party: Democratic
- Education: Temple University (BA); University of Massachusetts (JD)

Christopher Hendricks is an American attorney and politician serving as a member of the Massachusetts House of Representatives, representing Acushnet and New Bedford in the 11th Bristol District.

== Education ==
After attending New Bedford High School, Hendricks earned a Bachelor of Arts from Temple University and Juris Doctor from the University of Massachusetts School of Law.

== Career ==
Hendricks' legal practice focuses on worker compensation claims and labor rights.

Hendricks has been serving since 2018 and is a member of the Democratic Party. Hendricks serves on the House Committee on Redistricting, Joint Committee on Housing, Joint Committee on the Judiciary, and the Joint Committee on Veterans and Federal Affairs.

He also serves on the Gateway Cities Caucus and the Portuguese-American Caucus.

In 2025, Hendricks introduced legislation to prohibit the commercial farming of octopuses and the sale of farmed octopus in Massachusetts, citing concerns about octopus intelligence and animal rights.

== See also ==
- 2019–2020 Massachusetts legislature
- 2021–2022 Massachusetts legislature
