= Super League of Belize =

- Founded: 2006
- Folded: 2011
- Country: Belize
- Number of clubs: 8
- Last champions: Placencia Assassin (2011)

The Super League of Belize was a football organization established in 2006 to manage Belizean football. It had no affiliation with the national federation, the Football Federation of Belize. The league disbanded in 2011 after the merger with the Belize Premier Football League to create a new top league in Belize, the Premier League of Belize.

== History ==
The Super League got its start in 2005 managing games between Belizean office organizations, called "inter-office". In 2006 the league expanded to include City first division amateurs and Masters' over-35 competitions. Its most recent addition was a league of semipro teams, some formerly affiliated with the Belize Premier Football League, which began play in October 2007.

The League has announced plans for a female and B-division league.

== Officials ==
The President of the Super League is Michael Blease. The SLB's commissioner is former referee and commentator for the BPFL, Ruperto Vicente.

== Members ==
=== Teams 2011 ===
- Cayo South United
- Griga Knights
- Hattieville Monarch
- Orange Walk United
- Paradise Freedom Fighters
- Placencia Assassin
- R.G. City Boys United
- Third World F.C.

== Previous Winners ==
- 2007: Tex Mar Boys
- 2008: Valley Renaissance
- 2009: Tex Mar Boys
- 2010: City Boys United
- 2011: Placencia Assassin

== See also ==
- Barrio Fino F.C.
- Texmar United
