= Santel's SC =

Belizean football club

Santel's S.C.
- Full name: Santel's Sporting Club
- Founded: 2006
- Ground: Norman Broaster Stadium; San Ignacio, Belize
- Capacity: 2,000
- League: Belize Premier Football League
| Home colours | Away colours |

Santel's S.C. is a Belizean football team which currently competes in the Belize Premier Football League (BPFL) of the Football Federation of Belize.

The team is based in Santa Elena Town. Their home stadium is Norman Broaster Stadium.
