= CDCS Costa Del Sol Nairi's =

Belizean football club

Costa Del Sol Nairi's
- Full name: Club Deportivo Cultural y Social; Costa Del Sol Nairi's
- Nickname(s): Playeros
- Founded: 2006
- Ground: Ambergris Stadium; Ambergris Caye, Belize
- League: Belize Premier Football League
Home colours	Away colours

Costa Del Sol Nairi's was a Belizean football team that formerly competed in the Belize Premier Football League (BPFL) of the Football Federation of Belize.

The team was based in San Pedro Town. Their home stadium was Ambergris Stadium.
