= Revolutionary Conquerors FC =

Belizean football club

Revolutionary Conquerors
- Full name: Revolutionary Conquerors Football Club
- Founded: 2005
- Dissolved: 2008
- Ground: Carl Ramos Stadium; Dangriga, Belize
- Capacity: 3,500
- Chairman: Davis Marshall
- Manager: Palmiro Salas
- League: Belize Premier Football League
Home colours	Away colours

Revolutionary Conquerors was a Belizean football team which currently competes in the Belize Premier Football League (BPFL) of the Football Federation of Belize. The franchise was sold and became Ilagulei FC.

The team is based in Dangriga. Their home stadium is Carl Ramos Stadium.

The club was dissolved in 2008.

== Revolutionary Conquerors in international competition ==
- 1R = First round

Season	Competition	Round	Land	Club	Score
Copa Fraternidad 2007	Copa Interclubes UNCAF	1R	(Honduras)	Real España	1–2, 2–1 (pen 2–4)

== Current squad ==
Note: Flags indicate national team as defined under FIFA eligibility rules; some limited exceptions apply. Players may hold more than one non-FIFA nationality.

No.	Pos.	Nation	Player
—	MF	(Belize) BLZ	David Trapp

== Coaches ==
- (Guatemala) Palmero Salas
