= Griga United =

Belizean football club

Griga United is a Belizean football team based in Dangriga in Belize. The club was founded in 1994 as the Dangriga Jaguars and is founded by Timothy Flores and co owner Frank Castillo. The team play at the Carl Ramos Stadium.

== Coaches ==
- Pablo Cacho (2004)
