= Boca FC =

Belizean football club

- Founded: 2003
- Dissolved: 2006
- Ground: Michael Ashcroft Stadium
- Capacity: 2000
- Coordinates: 16°32′20″N 88°25′2″W
- League: Belize Premier Football League

Boca F.C. is a former Belizean football team that competed in the Belize Premier Football League (BPFL) of the Football Federation of Belize.

The team was based in Independence Village. Their home stadium was Michael Ashcroft Stadium. They have gone on to play internationally against Olimpia of Honduras, Alianza of El Salvador, and Alajuela of Costa Rica. The former manager of the team was Marco Chan. The team was sponsored by Strickland Co. Ltd.

== Achievements ==
- Belize Premier League: 1

2003/04
