= South Water Caye Marine Reserve =

Marine reserve of Belize

- IUCN category IV (habitat/species management area)
- Location within Belize
- Location: Gulf of Honduras, Belize
- Nearest city: Dangriga
- Coordinates: 16°49′9.29″N 88°5′0.68″W
- Area: 117,875 acres (47,702 ha)
- Established: 1996
- Governing body: Ministry of Natural Resources and the Environment

South Water Caye Marine Reserve is the second largest marine reserve in Belize. It was designated a marine reserve in 1996 by the Belize Fisheries Department and is managed by that organization. It covers 117,875 acres (47,702 ha) of mangrove and coastal ecosystems in Stann Creek District. It is part of the Belize Barrier Reef System, which was named a World Heritage Site in 1996, and is designated an IV Habitat/Species Management Area.

== Geography ==
The reserve is located on the inner side of the Belize Barrier Reef and is 18 kilometres (11 mi) or between 8 to 25 kilometres (5.0 to 15.5 mi) off the coast of the mainland of Belize. It is over 40 kilometres (25 mi) long.

It includes ecologically important mangrove cayes such as Pelican Cayes (considered "one of the most biodiverse marine systems within the western hemisphere"), Twin Cayes, and Man-O-War Caye (previously designated a Crown Reserve in 1977). (Some privately owned cayes are not part of the reserve.)

== Flora and fauna ==
The reserve provides a habitat for at least 24 species that are vulnerable, endangered or critically endangered: five coral species, three turtle, 15 fish and the West Indian manatee.

While many of the cayes are dominated by mangroves, some have shrub and coconut vegetation.

== Archaeology ==
Significant Maya sites have been found in the reserve.

== Concerns ==
Despite its protected status, most of the reserve's cayes have been leased for resort development and large areas of mangroves have been cut down. A 2009 study found that of the Pelican Cayes' 53.3 hectares (132 acres) area, 15.4 hectares (38 acres) (29%) of mangrove forests had been cleared. Manatee Caye, Northeast Caye and all but one of the Bird Cayes have also begun to be developed. In 2008, aerial photographs showed that mangroves had been removed from two of the Pelican Cayes; the government offered no explanation.

Illegal fishing is also a problem.
