= Barrio Fino FC =

Belizean football club

Barrio Fino
- Full name: Barrio Fino Football Club
- Founded: 2006
- Ground: Isidoro Beaton Stadium; Belmopan, Belize
- Capacity: 2500
- Chairman: Cyrus Mira
- Manager: Brian Mira
- League: Super League of Belize
| Home colours | Away colours |

Barrio Fino FC is a Belizean football team and formerly of the Super League of Belize.

The Team is based in Belmopan. Their home stadium is Isidoro Beaton Stadium.

== Team history and management ==
Composed mostly of high school and university students, it has been active in the Belmopan Football Association tournaments for the last 3 years and has been the Sub-Champs for two of those years.

The team is managed by Cyrus Mira, Billy Mira and Brian Mira, three brothers from Belmopan, who also share the Coaching title.

== See also ==
- Super League of Belize
