= Texmar United =

Belizean football club

- Founded: 2006
- Ground: Michael Ashcroft Stadium; Mango Creek, Belize
- Capacity: 2,000
- League: Super League of Belize (semipro division)
Home colours	Away colours

Texmar United is a Belizean football team which currently competes in the Super League of Belize, Semipro Division.

Formerly known as Tex Mar Boys, the team is based in Mango Creek. Their home stadium is Michael Ashcroft Stadium.

== Current squad ==
Note: Flags indicate national team as defined under FIFA eligibility rules; some limited exceptions apply. Players may hold more than one non-FIFA nationality.

No.	Pos.	Nation	Player
—	GK	(Belize) BLZ	Stephen Lopez
—	DF	(Belize) BLZ	Dalton Eiley
—	DF	(Belize) BLZ	John King
—	DF	(Belize) BLZ	Brent White
—	MF	(Belize) BLZ	Giovanni Reyes
—	MF	(Belize) BLZ	Gilmore Palacio
—	MF	(Belize) BLZ	Michael Cho
—	MF	(Belize) BLZ	Wilmer Garcia
—	FW	(Belize) BLZ	Ashley Torres
—		(Belize) BLZ	Victor Franco
—	MF	(Belize) BLZ	Robert Muschamp

No.	Pos.	Nation	Player
—	FW	(Belize) BLZ	Arnold Torres
—	FW	(Belize) BLZ	Norman Nuñez
—		(Peru) PER	Carlos Valle
—	GK	(Belize) BLZ	Marcel Garbutt
—		(Belize) BLZ	Lindon Brooks
—	FW	(Belize) BLZ	Dion Burgess
—	MF	(Belize) BLZ	Gabriel Ramos
—	DF	(Belize) BLZ	Bernard Linares
—	DF	(Belize) BLZ	Wilhelm Coe
—	DF	(Belize) BLZ	Kishane Pech
—	FW	(Belize) BLZ	Luis Torres

== See also ==
- Super League of Belize
