= Kulture Yabra FC =

Belizean football club

Kulture Yabra F.C.
- Full name: Kulture Yabra Football Club
- Founded: 1974
- Ground: MCC Grounds; Belize City, Belize
- Capacity: 7,500
- League: Belize Premier Football League
Home colours	Away colours

Kulture Yabra FC was established as Yabra Sporting Club in 1974 and are the former three time champions of the Belize Premier Football League (BPFL) of the Football Federation of Belize. The club participated in the first BPFL National Championship final during the 1991–92 season, claiming second place behind La Victoria (of Corozal Town).

Kulture Yabra FC was based in Belize City, Belize and competed on the MCC (Cricket) Grounds.

The club dissolved in 2004.

== Achievements ==
- Belize Premier League: 3

2000–01, 2001–02, 2003 (Dissident League)

== List of coaches ==
- (Belize) Marvin Ottley (2000–04)
