= Belmopan Blaze FC =

Belizean football club

Belmopan Blaze
- Full name: Belmopan Blaze Football Club
- Ground: Isidoro Beaton Stadium; Belmopan
- Capacity: 2,500
- League: Belize Premier Football League
Home colours	Away colours

Belmopan Blaze is a Belizean football team which competes in the Belize Premier Football League (BPFL) of the Football Federation of Belize. The Team is based in the nation's capital, Belmopan and their home stadiums are Isidoro Beaton Stadium, and FFB Field.
