= Marion Jones Sports Complex =

Soccer stadium in Belice

- Interactive map of Marion Jones Sports Complex
- Former names: National Stadium (until 2001)
- Address: Verga 1778; Belize City; Belize
- Coordinates: 17°30′49.35″N 88°11′47.94″W
- Capacity: 7,500

The Marion Jones Sports Complex, previously the National Stadium, is a multi-use stadium in Belize City, Belize. It is used mostly for football matches, track and field and cycling. The stadium holds 7,500.

It is named after former track athlete of Belizean descent, Marion Jones.

== History ==
The National Stadium was established sometime in the 1960s as a venue for horse racing, football and cycling. The Cross Country Cycling Classic and other such events often finished with laps around the cycle track, originally sand and later asphalt.

A famous murder, that of Derek "Itza" Brown, took place on its grounds in 1992.

Eventually, the stadium was upgraded to its present condition, with planned expansion and conversion to a domed stadium expected. After her visit to Belize in 2001 at the height of her success following the Sydney Olympics, the stadium was named after Jones. The naming became controversial after Jones had was stripped of all five of her Olympic medals due to taking performance-enhancing drugs. In 2009 the country announced plans to spend $14 million to refurbish the facility. In 2021 Great Belize Television reported that the stadium was "in a state of disrepair".
