= Belize Premier Football League =

- Founded: 1991
- Folded: 2011
- Country: Belize
- Number of clubs: 8
- International cup(s): Copa Interclubes UNCAF (before 2007); CONCACAF Champions League (after 2008)
- Website: Belize Premier Football League
- Current: continued by Premier League of Belize

The Belize Premier Football League (BPFL) (Caribbean Motors Cup) was the premier division of association football in Belize sanctioned by the Football Federation of Belize. The league disbanded in 2011 after the merger with the Super League of Belize to create a new top league in Belize, the Premier League of Belize.

== Belize Premier Football League 2010–11 Opening Season ==
- Belize Defence Force (Belize City)
- Belmopan Blaze (Belmopan)
- FC Belize (Belize City)
- Griga United (Dangriga)
- Hankook Verdes United (Benque Viejo)
- San Felipe Barcelona (Orange Walk Town)
- San Pedro Sea Dogs (San Pedro Town)
- Toledo Ambassadors (Toledo District)

== Previous winners ==
Previous winners were:

=== Interdistrict Championship ===
- 1969–70 : FC San Joaquín
- 1976–77 : Queens Park Rangers (Stann Creek United)
- 1978–79 : Queens Park Rangers (Stann Creek United)

=== BPFL Champions (1991–1997 BSFL, 1997–2003 BFL) ===
- 1991–92 : La Victoria (Corozal)
- 1992–93 : Acros Caribe (Belize City)
- 1993–94 : La Victoria (Corozal)
- 1994–95 : Acros Crystal (Belize City)
- 1995–96 : Suga Boys Juventus (Orange Walk)
- 1996–97 : Suga Boys Juventus (Orange Walk)
- 1997–98 : Suga Boys Juventus (Orange Walk)
- 1998–99 : Suga Boys Juventus (Orange Walk)
- 1999–2000 : Sagitún (Independence)
- 2000–01 : Kulture Yabra FC (Belize City)
- 2001–02 : Kulture Yabra FC (Belize City)

=== FFB "A" Tournament ===
- 2002–03 : New Site Erei (Dangriga)
- 2003–04 : Boca Juniors

=== BPFL Regent Challenge Champions Cup (Dissident League) ===
- 2002–03 : Sagitún (Independence)
- 2003 : Kulture Yabra FC (Belize City)
- 2004 : Sagitún (Independence)

=== BPFL Reunited ===
- 2005 : Suga Boys Juventus (Orange Walk)
- 2005–06 : New Site Erei (Dangriga)
- 2006 : New Site Erei (Dangriga)

=== RFG Insurance League ===
- 2006–07: FC Belize (Belize City)
- 2007: FC Belize (Belize City)
- 2007–08: Hankook Verdes (San Ignacio)
- 2008–09: Ilagulei FC (Dangriga)
- 2009: Nizhee Corozal (Corozal)
- 2009–10: Belize Defence Force (Opening season)

=== Caribbean Motors Cup ===
- 2009–10: Belize Defence Force (Closing season)
- 2010–11: Belize Defence Force (Opening season)

== Top scorers ==
Year	Topscorers	Team	Goals
1991–92	(Belize) Orlando Pinelo	San Pedro FC	9
1992–93	(Mexico) Felipe Moreno	Suga Boys Juventus	13
1993–94	(Angola) Mario Sikonga	San Pedro FC	11
1994–95	(Belize) Terencio Bennett		10
1995–96	(Belize) Norman Nuñez	Suga Boys Juventus	9
1996–97	(Belize) David McCauley	FC Corozal	14
1997–98	(Belize) Christopher Hendricks	Suga Boys Juventus	11
1998–99	(Belize) Oliver Hendricks	La Victoria Dolphins	14
1999–2000	(Belize) Oliver Hendricks	San Pedro Dolphins	11
2000–01	(Belize) Norman Nuñez	Kulture Yabra FC	14
2001–02	(Belize) Bent Burgess	Griga United	17
2002–03	(Belize) Rudolph Flowers	Suga Boys Juventus	8
2003–04	(Belize) Kenton Galvez	Jacintoville United	11
2005–06	(Belize) Deon McCauley	Kremandala	11
2006	(Belize) Norman Nuñez	New Site Erei	13
2006–07	(Belize) Deon McCaulay	Belize	19
2007–08	(Belize) Daniel Jimenez	Hankook Verdes	19
2008–09	(Belize) Deon McCaulay	Defence Force	27
2010–11 O	(Nigeria) Christian Okonkwo	FC Belize	11
2010–11 C	(Belize) Evan Mariano	Defence Force	7

O = Opening, C = Closing
