= Dangriga =

- Town
- Dangriga Town
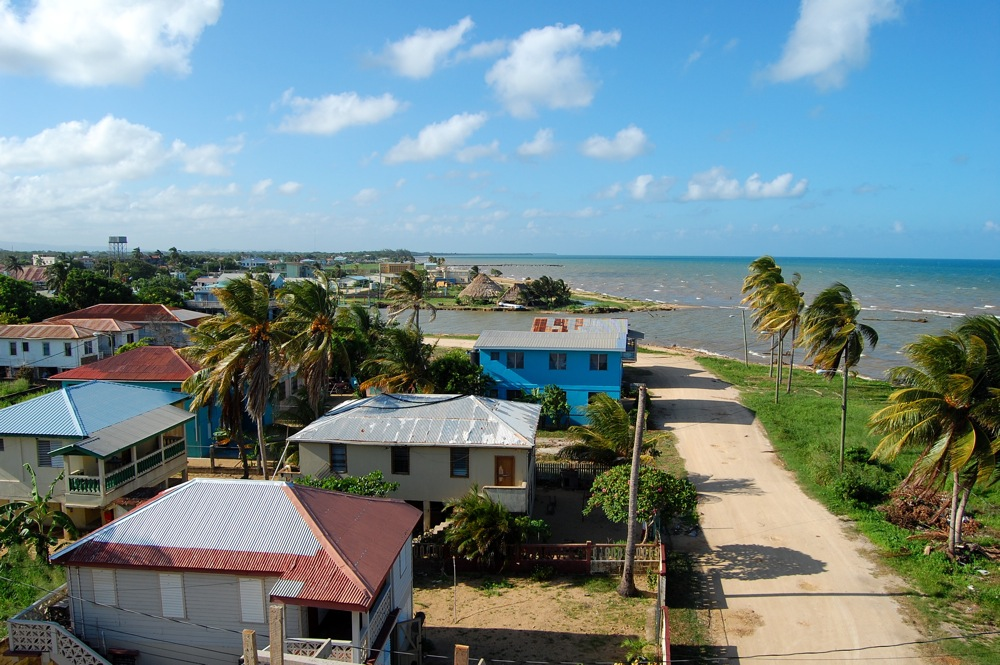
- Dangriga

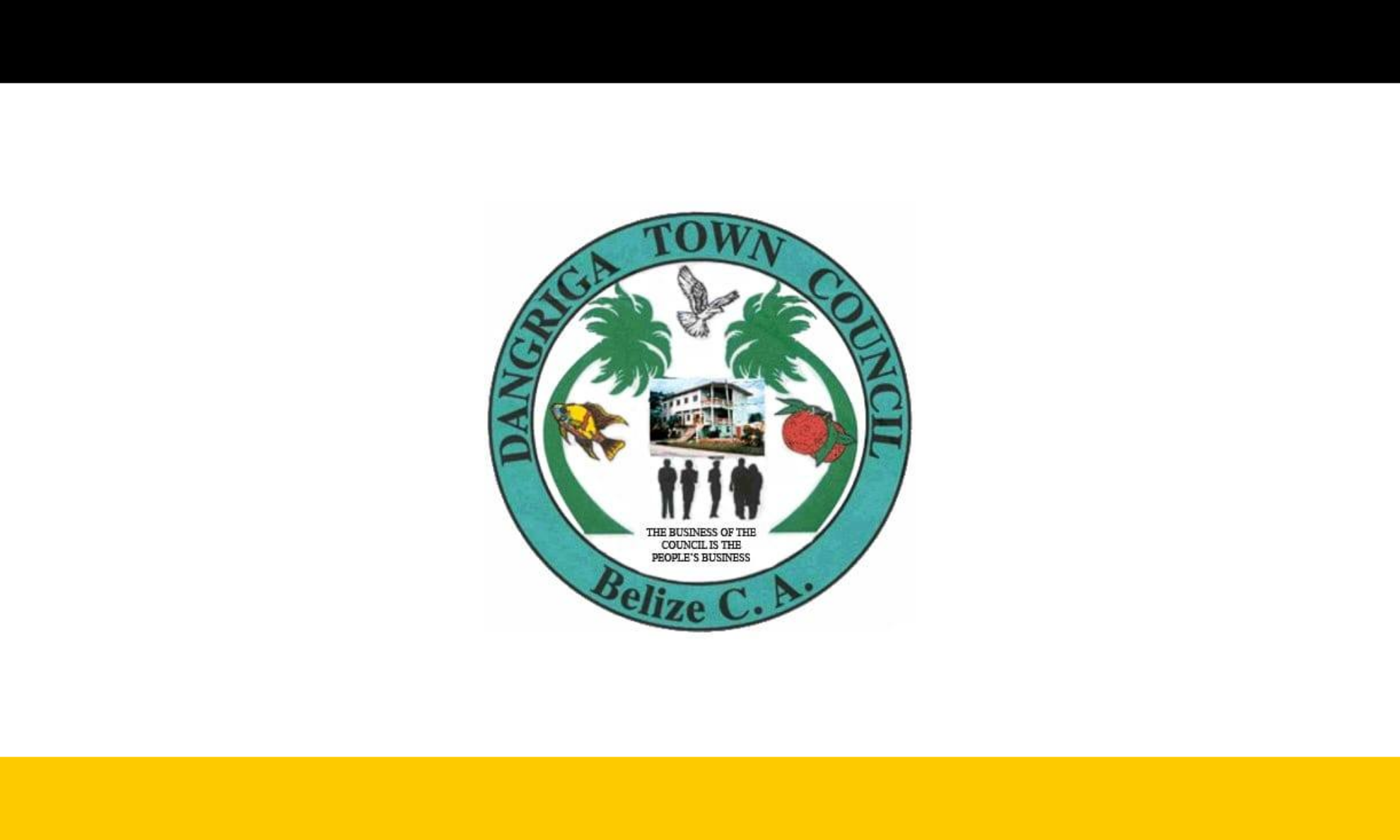
- Flag
- Nicknames: Griga (Dang), The Culture Capital
- Location in Belize
- Coordinates: 16°57′36″N 88°13′15″W
- Country: Belize
- District: Stann Creek
- Constituency: Dangriga
- Founded: 1802

Government
  - Mayor: Robert Mariano (PUP)
- Elevation: 4.3 m (14 ft)

Population (2010)
  - Total: 9,593
  - Estimate (2016): 10,217
- Demonym: Dangrigan
- Time zone: UTC-06:00 (CST)
- Climate: Am
- Website: Official Website

Dangriga, formerly known as Stann Creek Town, is a town in southern Belize, located on the Caribbean coast at the mouth of the North Stann Creek River. It is the capital of Belize's Stann Creek District. Dangriga is served by the Dangriga Airport. Commonly known as the "culture capital of Belize" due to its influence on punta music and other forms of Garifuna culture, Dangriga is the largest settlement in southern Belize.

== History ==
Dangriga, declared a town 15 February 1895, was settled before 1832 by Garinagu (Black Caribs, as they were known to the British) from Honduras. For years, it was the second largest population centre in the country behind Belize City, but in recent years has been surpassed by San Ignacio, Belmopan and Orange Walk Town. Since the early 1980s, Garífuna culture has undergone a revival, as part of which the town's name of Dangriga, a Garífuna word meaning "standing waters", became more widely used (but was initially adopted around 1975).

== Demographics ==
The population is mostly a mixture of Garinagu, Kriols and Mestizos. According to the Statistical Institute of Belize, Dangriga's population in 2010 was 8,767 – 4,302 males and 4,465 females.

== Culture ==
Dangriga is home to the Garifuna, a cultural and ethnic group, descendants of shipwrecked captives and native Caribs. The Garifuna have adopted the Carib language but kept their African musical and religious traditions, while holding a central place in the history of the Catholic church and Catholic education in Belize. Dangriga is also where the Caribbean music, Punta Rock, originated and where some of Belize's folk bands can be found.

In November, each year, there is a week-long festivity leading up to Garifuna Settlement Day, attended by Garifuna people from around the region. It includes a torchlit parade and wreath-laying ceremony at the monument of the patriot and social activist Thomas Vincent Ramos, selection of Miss Garifuna, parades and special church services, and The T.V. Ramos Classic Bike Race.

The 19 November is Garifuna Settlement Day.

== Attractions ==
- Cockscomb Basin Wildlife Sanctuary, located southwest of Dangriga.
- Mayflower Archeological Reserve, consisting of three ruins, two waterfalls and a view of Hopkins village as well as of the Caribbean Sea.
- Dangriga is also a mainland access point to popular cayes in Southern Belize, including Tobacco Caye and Royal Belize.

== Healthcare ==
The city is served by Southern Regional Hospital.

== Notable residents ==
- Arlie Petters, mathematician and astrophysicist
- Pen Cayetano, artist and musician residing in Germany. Originator of Punta Rock.
- Maxime Faget, designer of the Mercury capsule, and contributed to the later Gemini and Apollo spacecraft as well as the Space Shuttle.
- T. V. Ramos, Garifuna civil rights activist from Puerto Cortez, Honduras.
- Osmond P. Martin, first native Belizean Catholic bishop.
- Rakeem Nuñez-Roches, American football player for the New York Giants

== Gallery ==
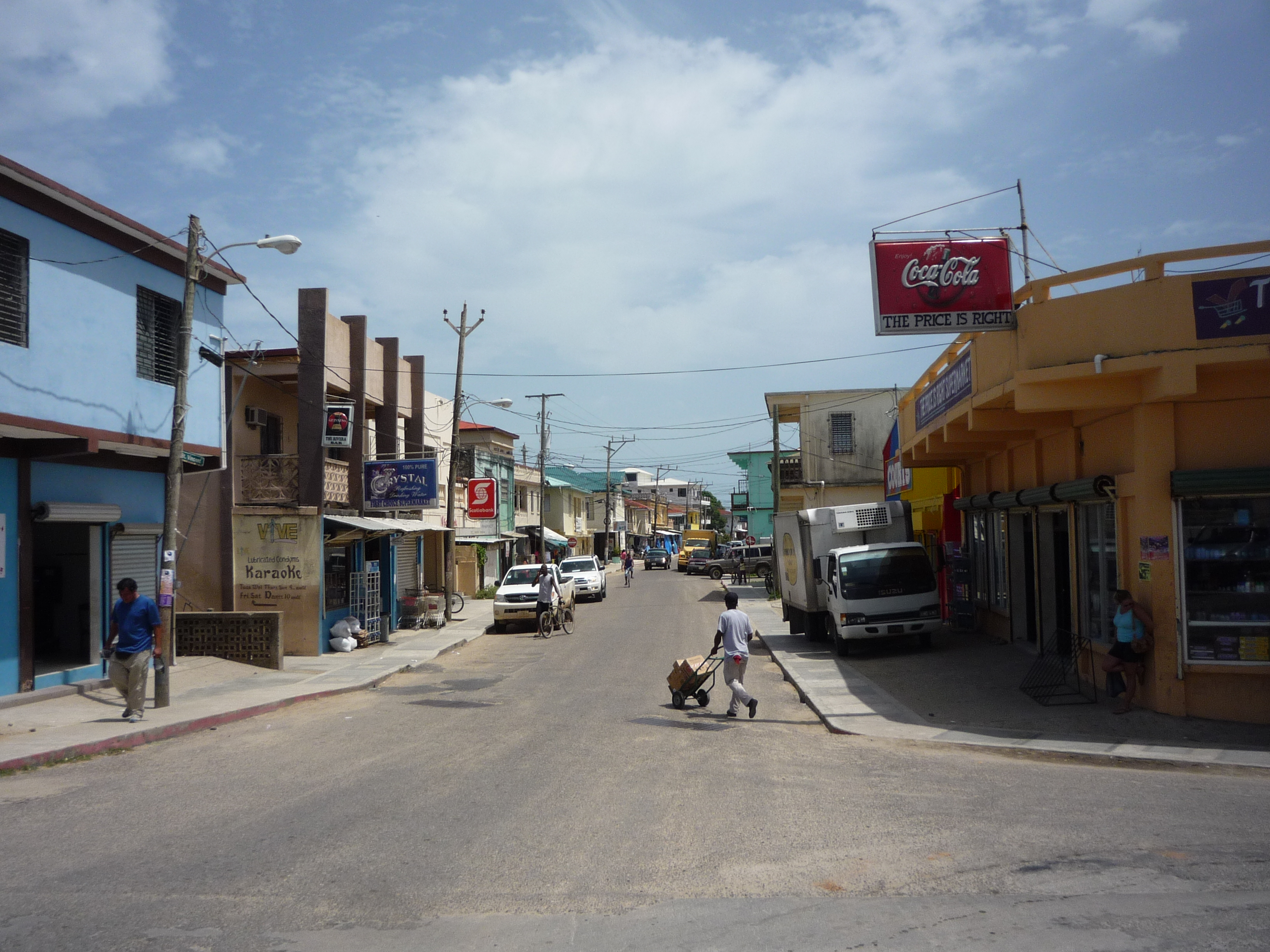
Dangriga main street

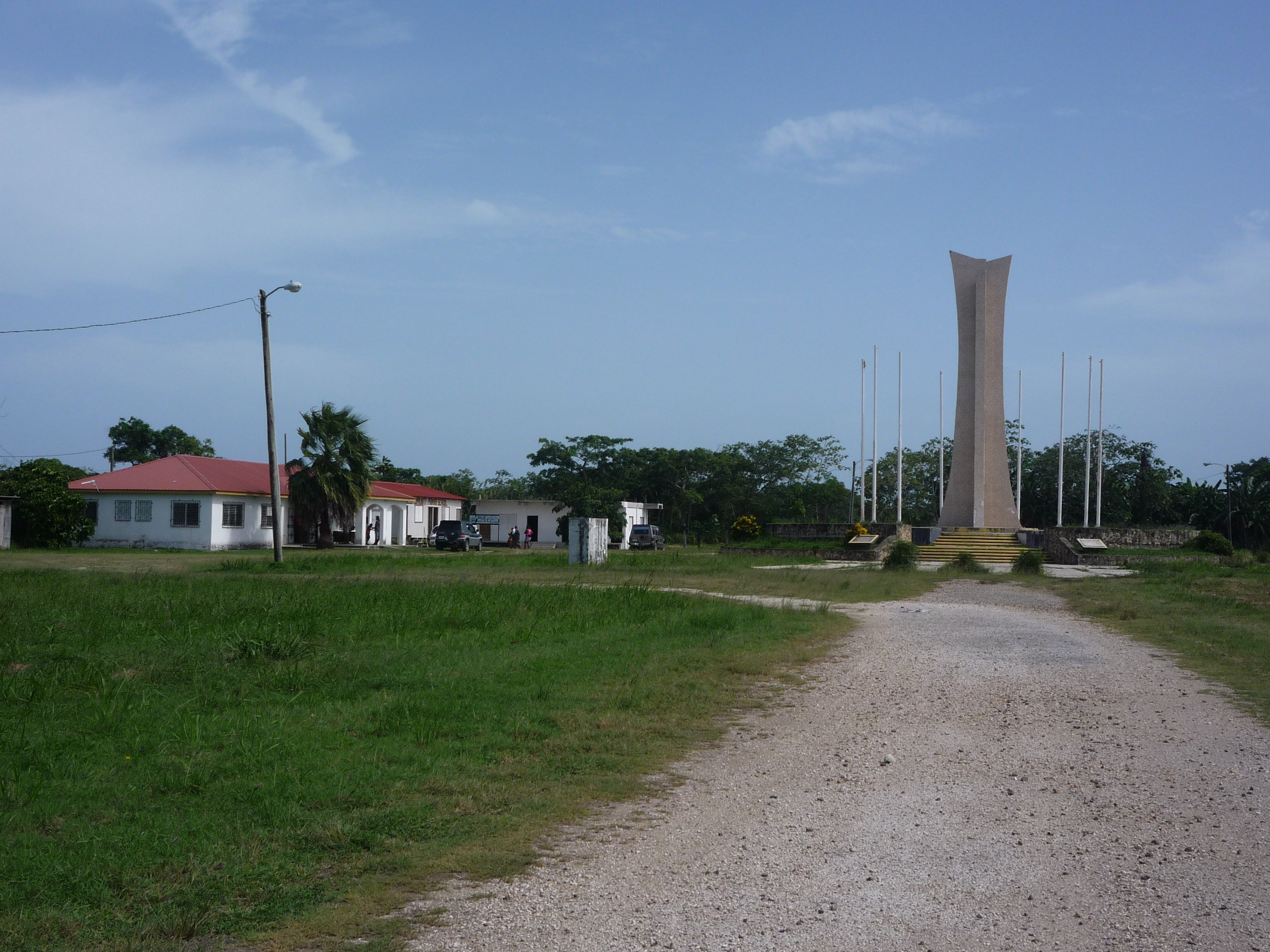
Garifuna Gulisi Museum

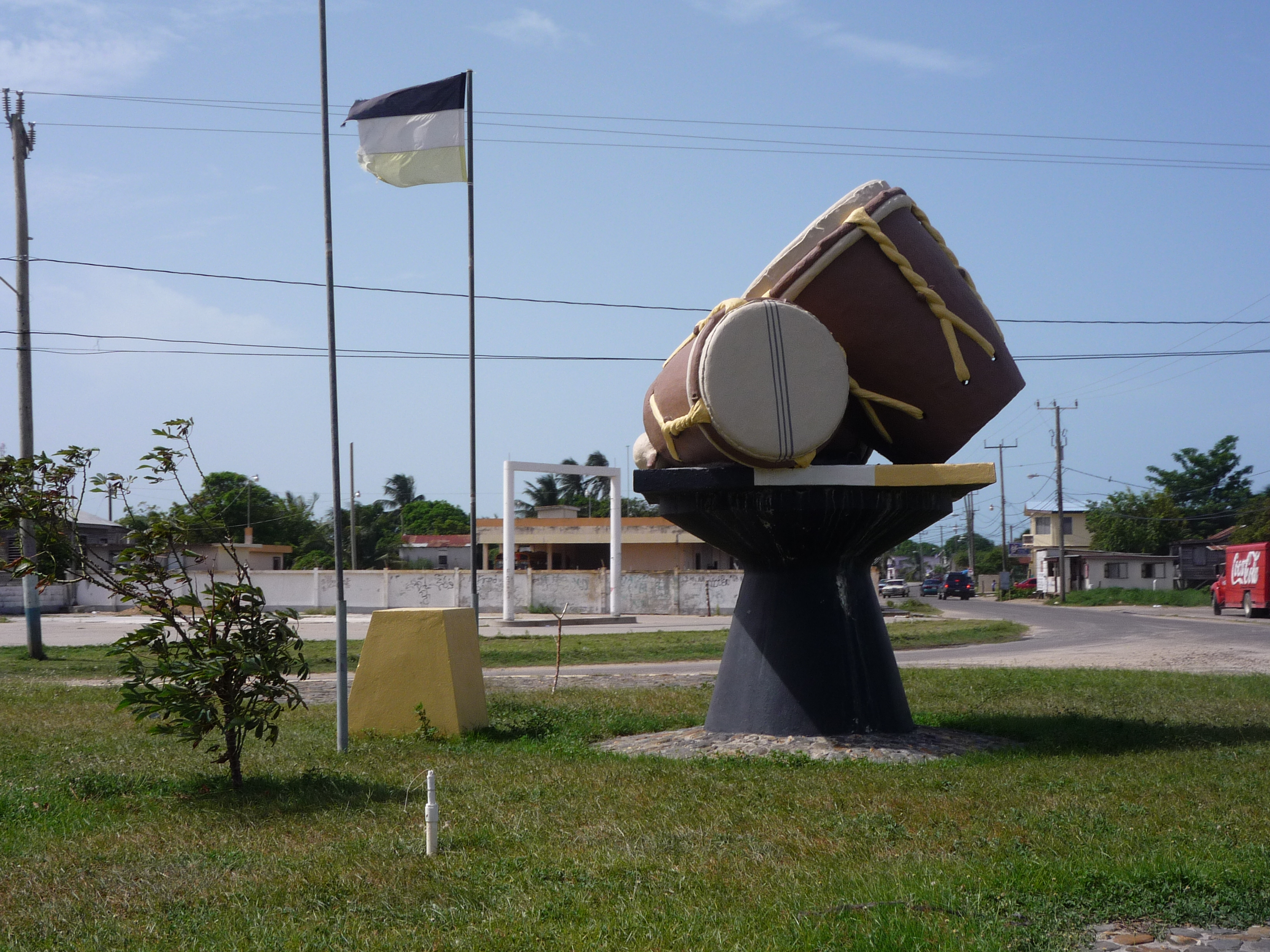
"Drums of Our Fathers" Monument

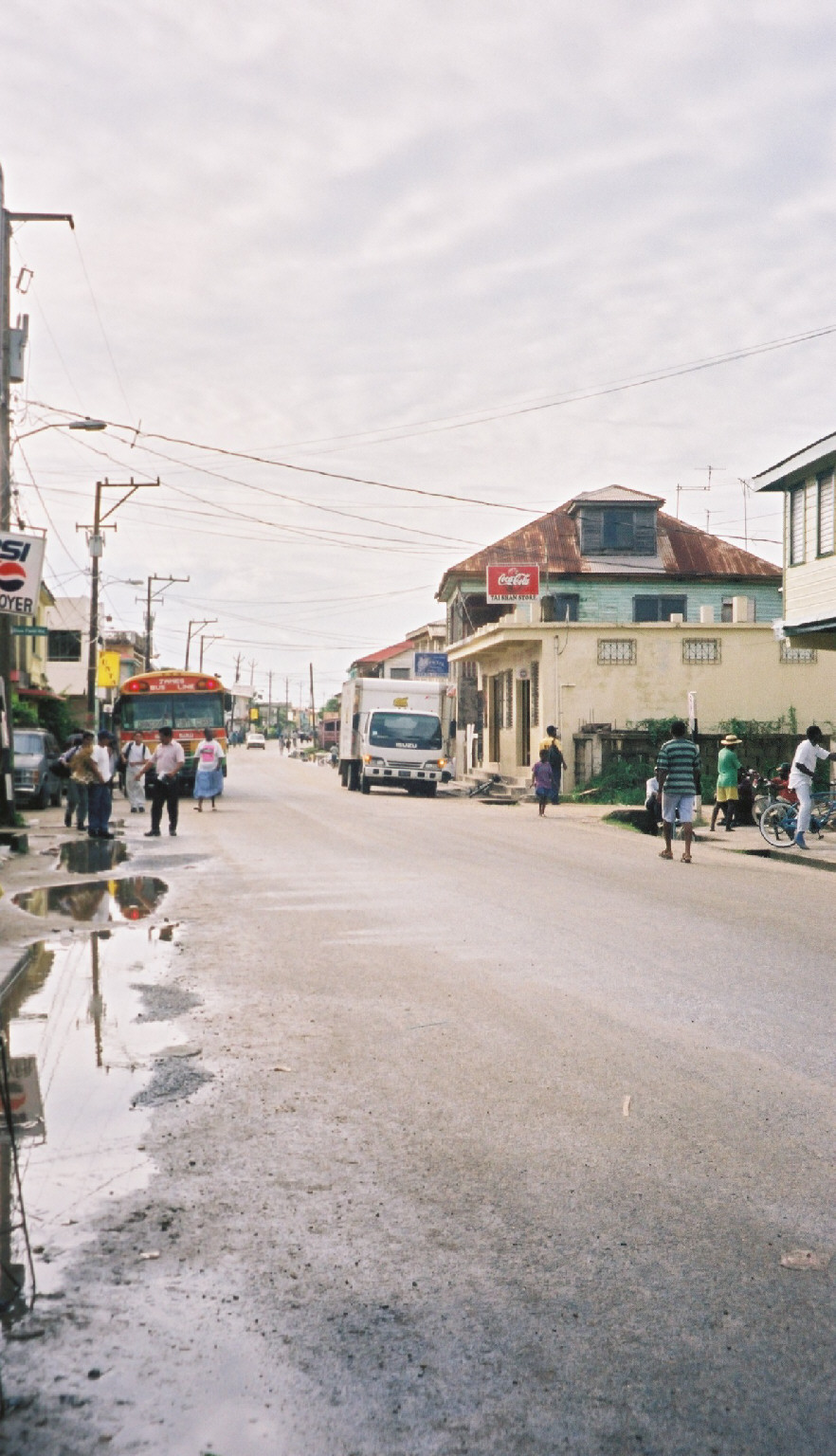
Dangriga, Belize Streets of Dangriga
