= 2024–25 F.C. Motagua season =

Motagua
2024–25 season
- Chairman: Eduardo Atala
- Manager: Diego Vásquez
- Stadium: Estadio Nacional
- Apertura: Winners
- Clausura: Semifinalist
- CONCACAF Central American Cup: Play-in win
- CONCACAF Champions Cup: Round one
- Top goalscorer: League: Auzmendi (19); All: Auzmendi (23)
Home colours	Away colours	Third colours
- All statistics correct as of 17 May 2025.

The 2024–25 season was F.C. Motagua's 78th season in existence and the club's 59th consecutive season in the top fight of Honduran football. In addition to the domestic league, the club competed in the 2024 CONCACAF Central American Cup and the 2025 CONCACAF Champions Cup.

== Overview ==
The club tried to improve on their 2023–24 season, where they finished title-less. On 30 October 2024, F.C. Motagua qualified to the 2025 CONCACAF Champions Cup after defeating C.D. Águila in the 2024 CONCACAF Central American Cup play-in round, thus becoming the only Honduran team to obtain such achievement. On 22 December, the club achieved the Apertura title, which represented their 19th domestic league, also obtaining a qualification to the 2025 CONCACAF Central American Cup. On 26 February 2025, the club was eliminated from the 2025 CONCACAF Champions Cup's Round one after losing 2–5 on aggregate against FC Cincinnati. On 17 May, the club lost on aggregated 1–2 against Real C.D. España in the Clausura semifinals, ending their season.

== Kits ==
The 2024–25 home, away and third kits were published on 25 June.

Manufacturer		Main sponsor	
Joma		Pepsi	
Home	Away	Alternative	Goalkeeper

== Players ==
=== Transfers in ===
Player	Contract date	Moving from
(Honduras) Jhen Portillo	21 May 2024	(Honduras) Vida
(Honduras) Óscar Padilla	22 May 2024	(Honduras) Génesis
(Uruguay) Sebastián Cardozo	9 August 2024	(Uruguay) Progreso
(Honduras) Jefryn Macías	24 December 2024	(Honduras) UPNFM
(Honduras) Alfred Jervis	14 January 2025	(Honduras) Juventus
(Argentina) Diego Ledesma	31 January 2025	(Ecuador) Técnico Universitario

=== Transfers out ===
Player	Released date	Moving to
(Honduras) Marcelo Pereira	13 June 2024	(Costa Rica) Cartaginés
(Honduras) Kevin Álvarez	26 June 2024	(Honduras) UPNFM
(Honduras) Juan Delgado	27 June 2024	(Honduras) Olancho
(Honduras) Wesly Decas	15 August 2024	(Israel) Hapoel Ra'anana
(Honduras) Rubilio Castillo	23 January 2025	(Colombia) Deportivo Pereira
(Argentina) Agustín Auzmendi	30 January 2025	(Argentina) Godoy Cruz

=== Squad ===
As of 17 May 2025

- Only league matches into account

No.	Pos.	Player name	Date of birth and age	Games played			Goals scored		
				< 23/24	24/25	Total	< 23/24	24/25	Total
2	DF	(Uruguay) Sebastián Cardozo	9 September 1995 (aged 28)	0	34	34	0	2	2
3	DF	(Honduras) Carlos Meléndez	8 December 1997 (aged 26)	79	7	86	5	1	6
4	MF	(Honduras) Luis Vega	28 February 2002 (aged 22)	24	32	56	3	4	7
5	MF	(Honduras) Óscar Padilla	7 November 1992 (aged 31)	0	15	15	0	1	1
6	DF	(Honduras) Riky Zapata	23 November 1997 (aged 26)	26	28	54	0	1	1
7	MF	(Panama) Jorge Serrano	19 January 1998 (aged 26)	17	32	49	1	4	5
8	MF	(Honduras) Walter Martínez	26 March 1991 (aged 33)	237	31	268	23	1	24
9	FW	(Honduras) Rubilio Castillo	26 November 1991 (aged 32)	188	16	204	105	8	113
10	MF	(Honduras) Yeison Mejía	18 January 1998 (aged 26)	35	37	72	7	3	10
11	FW	(Argentina) Agustín Auzmendi	1 February 1997 (aged 27)	41	23	64	26	16	42
11	FW	(Argentina) Diego Ledesma	26 June 1993 (aged 31)	0	12	12	0	4	4
12	MF	(Honduras) Raúl Santos	2 August 1992 (aged 31)	202	36	238	7	0	7
14	MF	(Honduras) Carlos Argueta	6 January 1999 (aged 25)	38	24	62	3	1	4
15	MF	(Honduras) Edwin Maldonado	4 March 1994 (aged 30)	41	14	55	0	0	0
16	MF	(Honduras) Héctor Castellanos	28 December 1992 (aged 31)	242	18	260	4	0	4
17	DF	(Honduras) Jhen Portillo	2 December 2002 (aged 21)	0	33	33	0	0	0
19	GK	(Argentina) Jonathan Rougier	29 October 1987 (aged 36)	235	13	248	1	0	1
21	MF	(Argentina) Rodrigo Gómez	2 January 1993 (aged 31)	17	37	54	1	4	5
22	FW	(Honduras) Edwin Munguía	4 May 2006 (aged 18)	1	2	3	0	0	0
23	MF	(Honduras) Alfred Jervis	14 June 2003 (aged 21)	0	2	2	0	0	0
24	FW	(Honduras) Antony García	29 October 2004 (aged 19)	7	0	7	0	0	0
25	GK	(Honduras) Marlon Licona	9 February 1991 (aged 33)	142	31	173	0	0	0
26	MF	(Honduras) Denis Meléndez	22 July 1995 (aged 28)	26	24	50	1	2	3
27	MF	(Honduras) Jefryn Macías	2 January 2004 (aged 20)	0	12	12	0	0	0
29	FW	(Argentina) Rodrigo Auzmendi	2 January 2001 (aged 23)	7	34	41	1	19	20
32	MF	(Honduras) Jonathan Núñez	26 November 2001 (aged 22)	83	23	106	3	0	3
33	FW	(Honduras) Emilio Izaguirre	22 September 2008 (aged 15)	0	0	0	0	0	0
34	DF	(Honduras) Giancarlos Sacaza	18 January 2004 (aged 20)	3	16	19	0	1	1
35	DF	(Honduras) Cristopher Meléndez	25 November 1997 (aged 26)	125	36	161	5	0	5
38	FW	(Honduras) Mathías Vásquez	15 December 2006 (aged 17)	1	16	17	1	6	7
42	MF	(Honduras) Jonathan Argueta	10 August 2007 (aged 16)	0	11	11	0	1	1
47	–	(Honduras) Santos Sambulá	29 August 2004 (aged 19)	1	0	1	0	0	0
50	FW	(Honduras) Aarón Barrios	19 October 2004 (aged 19)	13	0	13	0	0	0
51	MF	(Honduras) Jordan García	31 March 2006 (aged 18)	1	3	4	0	0	0
60	GK	(Honduras) Daniel Paguada	10 October 2005 (aged 18)	0	0	0	0	0	0
77	MF	(Honduras) Carlos Mejía	19 February 2000 (aged 24)	96	40	136	10	5	15
Manager		(Argentina) Diego Vásquez	3 July 1971 (aged 52)	26 November 2023 –					

=== Goalkeeper's action ===
As of 17 May 2025

Goalkeeper	Years evaluated	Games	Goals	Per.
(Argentina) Jonathan Rougier	2017–2025	248	248	1.000
(Honduras) Marlon Licona	2010–2017, 2018–2023, 2024–2025	173	187	1.081

=== International caps ===
As of 25 March 2025

This is a list of players that were playing for Motagua during the 2024–25 season and were called to represent Honduras at different international competitions.

Player	Team	Event	Caps	Goals
Rubilio Castillo	Adult	2024–25 CONCACAF Nations League	2	0
Cristopher Meléndez	Adult	2024–25 CONCACAF Nations League	3	0
Cristopher Meléndez	Adult	Friendly v Guatemala	1	0
Raúl Santos	Adult	2024–25 CONCACAF Nations League	3	0
Raúl Santos	Adult	Friendly v Guatemala	1	0
Luis Vega	Adult	2024–25 CONCACAF Nations League	6	0
Luis Vega	Adult	2025 CONCACAF Gold Cup	1	0
Luis Vega	Adult	Friendly v Guatemala	1	0
Marlon Licona	Adult	Friendly v Guatemala	1	0
Carlos Mejía	Adult	2025 CONCACAF Gold Cup	1	0
Carlos Mejía	Adult	Friendly v Guatemala	1	0
Daniel Paguada	U-20	2024 CONCACAF U-20 Championship	3	0
Mathías Vásquez	U-20	2024 CONCACAF U-20 Championship	3	1
Enmanuel Martín	U-17	2025 CONCACAF U-17 World Cup qualification	3	0
Josué Oyuela	U-17	2025 CONCACAF U-17 World Cup qualification	3	0
Darell Oliva	U-17	2025 CONCACAF U-17 World Cup qualification	3	0

== Results ==
All times are local CST unless stated otherwise

=== Preseason and friendlies ===
7 July 2024 Friendly	Motagua (Honduras)	3–0	(Guatemala) Municipal	New Orleans, United States
20:00	Castillo 34'; Auzmendi 55'; Mejía 88'			Stadium: Behrman Stadium; Referee: Starting XI: 25 – Licona; 3 – Meléndez; 4 – Vega; 6 – Zapata; 7 – Serrano; 9 – Castillo; 11 – Auzmendi; 12 – Santos (substituted off) 72'; 14 – Argueta (substituted off) 72'; 21 – Gómez (substituted off) 72'; 27 – Meléndez; Substitutes; 33 – Castellanos (substituted on) 72'; 8 – Martínez (substituted on) 72'; 32 – Núñez (substituted on) 72'

12 July 2024 Friendly	Horizon (United States)	1–2	(Honduras) Motagua	Houston, United States
20:00	García		21' Auzmendi; 36' Mejía	Stadium: Sheldon ISD Panther Stadium; Referee: Starting XI: 19 – Rougier; 4 – Vega; 6 – Zapata; 8 – Martínez (substituted off) 65'; 9 – Castillo; 10 – Mejía (substituted off) 65'; 11 – Auzmendi; 16 – Mejía (substituted off) 65'; 32 – Núñez (substituted off) 65'; 33 – Castellanos (substituted off) 65'; 35 – Meléndez; Substitutes; 7 – Serrano (substituted on) 65'; 12 – Santos (substituted on) 65'; 14 – Argueta (substituted on) 65'; 21 – Gómez (substituted on) 65'; 3 – Meléndez (substituted on) 65'

14 July 2024 Friendly	Miami United (United States)	2–4	(Honduras) Motagua	Hialeah, United States
17:30 EST	43'; Valdés 83'		12' (pen.) 29' Castillo; 45+2' Meléndez; 58' Auzmendi	Stadium: Milander Park; Referee: Starting XI: 25 – Licona; 3 – Meléndez; 4 – Vega; 6 – Zapata (substituted off) 65'; 7 – Serrano (substituted off) 65'; 9 – Castillo (substituted off) 63'; 11 – Auzmendi; 12 – Santos (substituted off) 63'; 14 – Argueta; 21 – Gómez; 35 – Meléndez; Substitutes; 15 – Maldonado (substituted on) 63'; 10 – Mejía (substituted on) 63'; 32 – Núñez (substituted on) 65'; 16 – Mejía (substituted on) 65'

16 July 2024 Friendly	Comunicaciones (Guatemala)	1–1	(Honduras) Motagua	Hartford, United States
17:00 EST	Gordillo 25'		(penalty missed) Auzmendi; 41' Castillo	Stadium: Trinity Health Stadium; Referee: Starting XI: 25 – Licona; 3 – Meléndez; 4 – Vega; 6 – Zapata; 7 – Serrano; 9 – Castillo; 11 – Auzmendi; 12 – Santos; 14 – Argueta; 21 – Gómez; 35 – Meléndez
Note: The game was suspended at the 58' minute due to an electric storm and was not resumed.

12 January 2025 Friendly	Juventus	0–5	Motagua	Corozal
15:00			Auzmendi; Núñez	Stadium: Estadio Rogelio Bustillo; Referee: Starting XI: 25 – Licona; 2 – Cardozo; 4 – Vega; 6 – Zapata; 10 – Mejía; 11 – Auzmendi; 12 – Santos; 21 – Gómez; 26 – Meléndez; 35 – Meléndez; 77 – Mejía
Note: This was the first ever encounter between these two clubs.

28 June 2025 Friendly	Pirata	0–1	Motagua	Nacaome
16:00			77' Jordán	Stadium: Estadio José Elías Nazar; Referee: Starting XI: 19 – Ortíz; 2 – Cardozo; 7 – Serrano; 12 – Santos; 14 – Argueta; 17 – Portillo; 26 – Meléndez; 27 – Macías; 29 – Jordán; 32 – Núñez; 34 – Sacaza
Note: This was the first ever encounter between these two clubs.

=== Apertura ===
26 July 2024 Week 1	Motagua	4–2	UPNFM	Tegucigalpa
19:00	Auzmendi 24' 49' 69'; Auzmendi 87'	Report	45+1' Padilla; 85' Peña	Stadium: Estadio Nacional; Referee: Raúl Castro Starting XI: 25 – Licona; 4 – Vega; 6 – Zapata; 7 – Serrano (substituted off) 69'; 9 – Castillo (substituted off) 79'; 11 – Auzmendi (substituted off) 79'; 12 – Santos; 14 – Argueta (substituted off) 85'; 16 – Castellanos; 21 – Gómez (substituted off) 85'; 35 – Meléndez; Substitutes; 26 – Meléndez (substituted on) 69'; 29 – Auzmendi (substituted on) 79'; 10 – Mejía (substituted on) 79'; 32 – Núñez (substituted on) 85'; 42 – Argueta (substituted on) 85'
Note: Forward Agustín Auzmendi scored his third league hat-trick. Youngster Jonathan Argueta made his professional debut wearing jersey #42.

3 August 2024 Week 2	Real España	1–0	Motagua	San Pedro Sula
17:15	Benavídez 45+5' (pen.)	Report		Stadium: Estadio General Francisco Morazán; Attendance: 1,350; Referee: Nelson Salgado Starting XI: 25 – Licona; 5 – Padilla (substituted off) 46'; 9 – Castillo (substituted off) 64'; 11 – Auzmendi; 14 – Argueta (substituted off) 73'; 15 – Maldonado; 17 – Portillo; 21 – Gómez (substituted off) 73'; 26 – Meléndez (substituted off) 46'; 34 – Sacaza; 35 – Meléndez; Substitutes; 10 – Mejía (substituted on) 46'; 77 – Mejía (substituted on) 46'; 8 – Martínez (substituted on) 64'; 32 – Núñez (substituted on) 73'; 7 – Serrano (substituted on) 73'
Note: Óscar Padilla and Jhen Portillo made their league debuts wearing jerseys #5 and #17 respectively.

10 August 2024 Week 3	Motagua	3–1	Real Sociedad	Tegucigalpa
19:00	Auzmendi 20' (pen.); Mejía 55'; Argueta 69'	Report	90+6' Martínez	Stadium: Estadio Nacional; Attendance: 500; Referee: Jefferson Escobar Starting XI: 19 – Rougier; 4 – Vega; 5 – Padilla; 8 – Martínez (substituted off) 75'; 10 – Mejía (substituted off) 70'; 12 – Santos; 17 – Portillo; 26 – Meléndez (substituted off) 70'; 29 – Auzmendi (substituted off) 75'; 34 – Sacaza; 77 – Mejía (substituted off) 66'; Substitutes; 14 – Argueta (substituted on) 66'; 16 – Castellanos (substituted on) 70'; 11 – Auzmendi (substituted on) 70'; 42 – Argueta (substituted on) 75'; 9 – Castillo (substituted on) 75'

18 August 2024 Week 4	Olimpia	1–1	Motagua	Tegucigalpa
17:15	Rodríguez 57'	Report	43' Vega; (penalty missed) Auzmendi	Stadium: Estadio Nacional; Referee: Nelson Salgado Starting XI: 25 – Licona; 4 – Vega; 5 – Padilla; 9 – Castillo (substituted off) 67'; 10 – Mejía (substituted off) 63'; 11 – Auzmendi; 12 – Santos; 17 – Portillo; 21 – Gómez (substituted off) 63'; 26 – Meléndez (substituted off) 81'; 35 – Meléndez; Substitutes; 7 – Serrano (substituted on) 63'; 8 – Martínez (substituted on) 63'; 29 – Auzmendi (substituted on) 67'; 16 – Castellanos (substituted on) 81'

24 August 2024 Week 5	Olancho	0–0	Motagua	Juticalpa
17:15		Report		Stadium: Estadio Juan Ramón Brevé Vargas; Attendance: 2,000; Referee: Marvin Ortiz Starting XI: 25 – Licona; 2 – Cardozo; 4 – Vega; 5 – Padilla; 7 – Serrano (substituted off) 60'; 8 – Martínez (substituted off) 78'; 12 – Santos; 17 – Portillo; 21 – Gómez (substituted off) 46'; 26 – Meléndez; 29 – Auzmendi (substituted off) 60'; Substitutes; 10 – Mejía (substituted on) 46'; 9 – Castillo (substituted on) 60'; 11 – Auzmendi (substituted on) 60'; 77 – Mejía (substituted on) 78'
Note: Defender Sebastián Cardozo made his league debut wearing jersey #2.

1 September 2024 Week 6	Motagua	0–1	Marathón	Tegucigalpa
17:00		Report	35' Tejeda	Stadium: Estadio Nacional; Referee: Luís Mejía Starting XI: 25 – Licona; 2 – Cardozo; 3 – Meléndez; 5 – Padilla; 8 – Martínez (substituted off) 46'; 9 – Castillo; 11 – Auzmendi (substituted off) 76'; 12 – Santos; 14 – Argueta (substituted off) 64'; 17 – Portillo (substituted off) 46'; 26 – Meléndez (substituted off) 46'; Substitutes; 21 – Gómez (substituted on) 46'; 6 – Zapata (substituted on) 46'; 10 – Mejía (substituted on) 46'; 7 – Serrano (substituted on) 64'; 29 – Auzmendi (substituted on) 76'

14 September 2024 Week 7	Génesis	0–3	Motagua	Comayagua
17:15		Report	54' Gómez; 87' Castillo; 90+3' Zapata	Stadium: Estadio Carlos Miranda; Referee: Saíd Martínez Starting XI: 19 – Rougier; 2 – Cardozo (substituted off) 73'; 3 – Meléndez; 6 – Zapata; 7 – Serrano (substituted off) 64'; 10 – Mejía; 11 – Auzmendi (substituted off) 73'; 14 – Argueta (substituted off) 64'; 16 – Castellanos (substituted off) 82'; 21 – Gómez; 77 – Mejía; Substitutes; 12 – Santos (substituted on) 64'; 26 – Meléndez (substituted on) 64'; 4 – Vega (substituted on) 73'; 9 – Castillo (substituted on) 73'; 15 – Maldonado (substituted on) 82'
Note: Defender Riky Zapata scored his first league goal for the club. Midfielder Carlos Mejía reached 100 league appearances with the club.

18 September 2024 Week 8	Motagua	3–0	Juticalpa	Tegucigalpa
17:15	Castillo 27'; Auzmendi 59' (pen.) 83'	Report		Stadium: Estadio Nacional; Referee: Yony Sánchez Starting XI: 19 – Rougier; 4 – Vega; 6 – Zapata; 9 – Castillo (substituted off) 80'; 10 – Mejía (substituted off) 63'; 11 – Auzmendi; 12 – Santos (substituted off) 63'; 21 – Gómez (substituted off) 76'; 35 – Meléndez; 42 – Argueta; 77 – Mejía; Substitutes; 8 – Martínez (substituted on) 63'; 32 – Núñez (substituted on) 63'; 7 – Serrano (substituted on) 76'; 29 – Auzmendi (substituted on) 80'

22 September 2024 Week 9	Victoria	1–3	Motagua	La Ceiba
15:00	Güitty 54'	Report	44' Meléndez; 69' Mejía; 90' Serrano	Stadium: Estadio Nilmo Edwards; Attendance: 1,000; Referee: Luís Mejía Starting XI: 25 – Licona; 2 – Cardozo; 3 – Meléndez; 7 – Serrano; 8 – Martínez (substituted off) 73'; 14 – Argueta (substituted off) 65'; 16 – Castellanos (substituted off) 73'; 17 – Portillo (substituted off) 56'; 26 – Meléndez; 29 – Auzmendi (substituted off) 65'; 35 – Meléndez; Substitutes; 6 – Zapata (substituted on) 56'; 9 – Castillo (substituted on) 65'; 77 – Mejía (substituted on) 65'; 21 – Gómez (substituted on) 73'; 15 – Maldonado (substituted on) 73'

28 September 2024 Week 10	UPNFM	0–2	Motagua	Choluteca
17:15		Report	24' Argueta; 36' Serrano	Stadium: Estadio Emilio Williams Agasse; Attendance: 5,000; Referee: Selvin Brown Starting XI: 25 – Licona; 3 – Meléndez (substituted off) 46'; 4 – Vega; 7 – Serrano (substituted off) 65'; 8 – Martínez (substituted off) 73'; 16 – Castellanos (substituted off) 73'; 17 – Portillo; 29 – Auzmendi; 32 – Núñez; 42 – Argueta; 77 – Mejía (substituted off) 65'; Substitutes; 34 – Sacaza (substituted on) 46'; 10 – Mejía (substituted on) 65'; 35 – Meléndez (substituted on) 65'; 21 – Gómez (substituted on) 73'; 15 – Maldonado (substituted on) 73'
Note: Jonathan Argueta scored his first goal for the club.

6 October 2024 Week 11	Motagua	0–4	Real España	Tegucigalpa
17:00		Report	4' García; 30' Velásquez; 75' Mejía; 79' Bodden	Stadium: Estadio Nacional; Referee: Armando Castro Starting XI: 25 – Licona; 2 – Cardozo; 4 – Vega; 7 – Serrano (substituted off) 56'; 9 – Castillo (substituted off) 57'; 16 – Castellanos; 17 – Portillo (substituted off) 66'; 21 – Gómez; 26 – Meléndez (substituted off) 46'; 35 – Meléndez (substituted off) 46'; 77 – Mejía; Substitutes; 11 – Auzmendi (substituted on) 46'; 12 – Santos (substituted on) 46'; 8 – Martínez (substituted on) 56'; 29 – Auzmendi (substituted on) 57'; 10 – Mejía (substituted on) 66'
Note: This became the largest home defeat against Real C.D. España in league's history.

19 October 2024 Week 12	Real Sociedad	1–4	Motagua	Tocoa
19:15	Mónico 57'	Report	18' 37' Auzmendi; 49' Mejía; 80' Auzmendi	Stadium: Estadio Francisco Martínez Durón; Referee: Julio Güity Starting XI: 19 – Rougier; 2 – Cardozo; 3 – Meléndez; 7 – Serrano (substituted off) 65'; 8 – Martínez; 11 – Auzmendi (substituted off) 65'; 15 – Maldonado; 17 – Portillo (substituted off) 65'; 26 – Meléndez (substituted off) 57'; 42 – Argueta (substituted off) 71'; 77 – Mejía; Substitutes; 32 – Núñez (substituted on) 57'; 14 – Argueta (substituted on) 65'; 29 – Auzmendi (substituted on) 65'; 6 – Zapata (substituted on) 65'; 35 – Meléndez (substituted on) 71'

26 October 2024 Week 13	Motagua	1–1	Olimpia	Tegucigalpa
19:30	Auzmendi 90'	Report	87' Najar	Stadium: Estadio Nacional; Attendance: 10,000; Referee: Saíd Martínez Starting XI: 25 – Licona; 2 – Cardozo; 3 – Meléndez; 6 – Zapata (substituted off) 54'; 7 – Serrano (substituted off) 79'; 11 – Auzmendi (substituted off) 66'; 12 – Santos; 21 – Gómez; 26 – Meléndez (substituted off) 67'; 35 – Meléndez; 77 – Mejía (substituted off) 79'; Substitutes; 17 – Portillo (substituted on) 54'; 29 – Auzmendi (substituted on) 66'; 32 – Núñez (substituted on) 67'; 14 – Argueta (substituted on) 79'; 10 – Mejía (substituted on) 79'
Note: Carlos Meléndez reached 100 official appearances with the club on all tournaments combined.

3 November 2024 Week 14	Motagua	2–2	Olancho	Tegucigalpa
17:15	Castillo 34' 54'	Report	3' Hernández; 63' López	Stadium: Estadio Nacional; Attendance: 1,000; Referee: Melissa Borjas Starting XI: 19 – Rougier; 2 – Cardozo; 3 – Meléndez (substituted off) 40'; 6 – Zapata; 9 – Castillo (substituted off) 69'; 12 – Santos; 14 – Argueta; 16 – Castellanos; 17 – Portillo (substituted off) 46'; 21 – Gómez (substituted off) 69'; 42 – Argueta (substituted off) 46'; Substitutes; 4 – Vega (substituted on) 40'; 15 – Maldonado (substituted on) 46'; 35 – Meléndez (substituted on) 46'; 11 – Auzmendi (substituted on) 69'; 77 – Mejía (substituted on) 69'

6 November 2024 Week 15	Marathón	2–1	Motagua	San Pedro Sula
15:00	Castillo 40'; Vega 62'	Report	20' Castillo	Stadium: Estadio Yankel Rosenthal; Attendance: 2,000; Referee: Raúl Castro Starting XI: 25 – Licona; 2 – Cardozo; 4 – Vega; 6 – Zapata (substituted off) 67'; 9 – Castillo (substituted off) 67'; 11 – Auzmendi; 15 – Maldonado (substituted off) 67'; 21 – Gómez (substituted off) 73'; 26 – Meléndez; 35 – Meléndez; 77 – Mejía (substituted off) 73'; Substitutes; 17 – Portillo (substituted on) 67'; 29 – Auzmendi (substituted on) 67'; 10 – Mejía (substituted on) 67'; 14 – Argueta (substituted on) 73'; 8 – Martínez (substituted on) 73'
Note: Rubilio Castillo reached 200 league appearances with the club.

10 November 2024 Week 16	Motagua	2–1	Génesis	Tegucigalpa
19:30	Castillo 11' (pen.) 35'	Report	72' (o.g.) Vásquez	Stadium: Estadio Nacional; Attendance: 60; Referee: Nelson Salgado Starting XI: 25 – Licona; 2 – Cardozo; 4 – Vega; 6 – Zapata (substituted off) 46'; 9 – Castillo (substituted off) 79'; 11 – Auzmendi (substituted off) 73'; 15 – Maldonado; 16 – Castellanos; 21 – Gómez (substituted off) 79'; 35 – Meléndez; 42 – Argueta (substituted off) 46'; Substitutes; 17 – Portillo (substituted on) 46'; 38 – Vásquez (substituted on) 46'; 8 – Martínez (substituted on) 73'; 29 – Auzmendi (substituted on) 79'; 77 – Mejía (substituted on) 79'

24 November 2024 Week 17	Juticalpa	1–3	Motagua	Juticalpa
15:00	Meléndez 37' (pen.)	Report	64' Auzmendi; 75' 86' Auzmendi	Stadium: Estadio Juan Ramón Brevé Vargas; Attendance: 15; Referee: Kelvin Pineda Starting XI: 19 – Rougier; 2 – Cardozo; 6 – Zapata; 7 – Serrano (substituted off) 59'; 11 – Auzmendi; 12 – Santos; 21 – Gómez (substituted off) 78'; 26 – Meléndez (substituted off) 59'; 35 – Meléndez; 42 – Argueta (substituted off) 46'; 77 – Mejía (substituted off) 82'; Substitutes; 14 – Argueta (substituted on) 46'; 10 – Mejía (substituted on) 59'; 29 – Auzmendi (substituted on) 59'; 15 – Maldonado (substituted on) 78'; 32 – Núñez (substituted on) 82'

30 November 2024 Week 18	Motagua	5–2	Victoria	Tegucigalpa
19:00	Castillo 11'; Auzmendi 37' 39'; Auzmendi 76' (pen.) 90+3'	Report	45' Barrios; 63' Blackburn	Stadium: Estadio Nacional; Attendance: 1,500; Referee: Melissa Borjas Starting XI: 25 – Licona; 4 – Vega (substituted off) 46'; 8 – Martínez; 9 – Castillo (substituted off) 63'; 10 – Mejía (substituted off) 63'; 11 – Auzmendi; 12 – Santos; 17 – Portillo; 34 – Sacaza; 42 – Argueta; 77 – Mejía (substituted off) 85'; Substitutes; 16 – Castellanos (substituted on) 46'; 29 – Auzmendi (substituted on) 63'; 7 – Serrano (substituted on) 63'; 22 – Munguía (substituted on) 85'
Note: Manager Diego Vásquez reached his 200th league win with the club

12 December 2024 Semifinals	Real España	0–2	Motagua	San Pedro Sula
19:30		Report	69' Meléndez; 86' Gómez	Stadium: Estadio General Francisco Morazán; Attendance: 1,000; Referee: Selvin Brown Starting XI: 25 – Licona; 2 – Cardozo; 4 – Vega; 6 – Zapata (substituted off) 75'; 7 – Serrano (substituted off) 65'; 11 – Auzmendi (substituted off) 75'; 12 – Santos; 14 – Argueta; 26 – Meléndez (substituted off) 85'; 35 – Meléndez; 77 – Mejía (substituted off) 85'; Substitutes; 21 – Gómez (substituted on) 65'; 9 – Castillo (substituted on) 75'; 17 – Portillo (substituted on) 75'; 10 – Mejía (substituted on) 85'; 16 – Castellanos (substituted on) 85'

15 December 2024 Semifinals	Motagua	1–0	Real España	Tegucigalpa
17:00	Auzmendi 16'	Report		Stadium: Estadio Nacional; Attendance: 10,000; Referee: Jefferson Escobar Starting XI: 25 – Licona; 2 – Cardozo; 4 – Vega; 6 – Zapata; 7 – Serrano (substituted off) 46'; 11 – Auzmendi (substituted off) 61'; 12 – Santos (substituted off) 73'; 14 – Argueta; 26 – Meléndez (substituted off) 46'; 35 – Meléndez; 77 – Mejía (substituted off) 46'; Substitutes; 21 – Gómez (substituted on) 46'; 9 – Castillo (substituted on) 46'; 15 – Maldonado (substituted on) 46'; 29 – Auzmendi (substituted on) 61'; 16 – Castellanos (substituted on) 73'

19 December 2024 Final	Motagua	1–1	Olimpia	Tegucigalpa
19:00	Auzmendi 3'	Report	40' Arboleda	Stadium: Estadio Nacional; Attendance: 10,000; Referee: Selvin Brown Starting XI: 25 – Licona; 2 – Cardozo; 4 – Vega; 6 – Zapata; 7 – Serrano (substituted off) 60'; 11 – Auzmendi (substituted off) 79'; 12 – Santos; 21 – Gómez (substituted off) 79'; 32 – Núñez (substituted off) 60'; 35 – Meléndez; 77 – Mejía (substituted off) 83'; Substitutes; 10 – Mejía (substituted on) 60'; 26 – Meléndez (substituted on) 60'; 29 – Auzmendi (substituted on) 79'; 8 – Martínez (substituted on) 79'; 9 – Castillo (substituted on) 83'

22 December 2024 Final	Olimpia	0–1	Motagua	Tegucigalpa
18:00		Report	75' (o.g.) García	Stadium: Estadio Nacional; Attendance: 10,000; Referee: Saíd Martínez Starting XI: 25 – Licona; 2 – Cardozo; 4 – Vega; 6 – Zapata; 7 – Serrano (substituted off) 83'; 11 – Auzmendi (substituted off) 74'; 12 – Santos; 21 – Gómez (substituted off) 74'; 26 – Meléndez; 35 – Meléndez; 77 – Mejía (substituted off) 90'; Substitutes; 29 – Auzmendi (substituted on) 74'; 10 – Mejía (substituted on) 74'; 16 – Castellanos (substituted on) 83'; 14 – Argueta (substituted on) 90'

=== Clausura ===
19 January 2025 Week 1	Motagua	3–0	Real Sociedad	Tegucigalpa
17:15	Auzmendi 4' 50'; Mejía 14'	Report		Stadium: Estadio Nacional; Attendance: 10,000; Referee: Kevin Ulloa Starting XI: 25 – Licona; 2 – Cardozo; 4 – Vega; 6 – Zapata (substituted off) 70'; 10 – Mejía (substituted off) 57'; 11 – Auzmendi; 12 – Santos (substituted off) 78'; 21 – Gómez (substituted off) 57'; 32 – Núñez (substituted off) 70'; 35 – Meléndez; 77 – Mejía; Substitutes; 38 – Vásquez (substituted on) 57'; 8 – Martínez (substituted on) 57'; 17 – Portillo (substituted on) 70'; 5 – Padilla (substituted on) 70'; 27 – Macías (substituted on) 78'
Note: Agustín Auzmendi scored F.C. Motagua's 3000th goal in all official competitions combined. Jefryn Macías made his league debut.

25 January 2025 Week 2	Olancho	2–1	Motagua	Juticalpa
19:30	Hernández 45' 71'	Report	24' (pen.) Auzmendi	Stadium: Estadio Juan Ramón Brevé Vargas; Attendance: 35; Referee: Jefferson Escobar Starting XI: 25 – Licona; 2 – Cardozo; 4 – Vega; 10 – Mejía (substituted off) 57'; 11 – Auzmendi; 12 – Santos (substituted off) 73'; 17 – Portillo; 21 – Gómez (substituted off) 62'; 32 – Núñez (substituted off) 57'; 35 – Meléndez; 77 – Mejía (substituted off) 62'; Substitutes; 7 – Serrano (substituted on) 57'; 29 – Auzmendi (substituted on) 57'; 14 – Argueta (substituted on) 62'; 15 – Maldonado (substituted on) 62'; 8 – Martínez (substituted on) 73'

30 January 2025 Week 3	Motagua	2–2	Marathón	Tegucigalpa
19:30	Auzmendi 45+2'; Sacaza 90+2'	Report	54' Vega; 84' Ramos	Stadium: Estadio Nacional; Referee: Nelson Salgado Starting XI: 25 – Licona; 2 – Cardozo; 4 – Vega (substituted off) 37'; 6 – Zapata; 7 – Serrano; 12 – Santos; 16 – Castellanos (substituted off) 77'; 21 – Gómez (substituted off) 60'; 29 – Auzmendi (substituted off) 76'; 35 – Meléndez; 77 – Mejía (substituted off) 76'; Substitutes; 34 – Sacaza (substituted on) 37'; 27 – Macías (substituted on) 60'; 10 – Mejía (substituted on) 76'; 11 – Auzmendi (substituted on) 76'; 32 – Núñez (substituted on) 77'
Note: Giancarlos Sacaza scored his first league goal for the club.

2 February 2025 Week 4	Génesis	1–1	Motagua	Comayagua
19:30	Canales 88'	Report	16' Martínez	Stadium: Estadio Carlos Miranda; Attendance: 40; Referee: Raúl Castro Starting XI: 25 – Licona; 2 – Cardozo; 6 – Zapata; 7 – Serrano (substituted off) 31'; 8 – Martínez (substituted off) 62'; 10 – Mejía; 12 – Santos (substituted off) 73'; 29 – Auzmendi; 34 – Sacaza; 35 – Meléndez (substituted off) 63'; 77 – Mejía (substituted off) 74'; Substitutes; 15 – Maldonado (substituted on) 31'; 21 – Gómez (substituted on) 62'; 14 – Argueta (substituted on) 63'; 16 – Castellanos (substituted on) 73'; 27 – Macías (substituted on) 74'

6 February 2025 Week 5	Motagua	5–0	UPNFM	Tegucigalpa
19:30	Padilla 1'; Auzmendi 88' 11' 66'; Vásquez 68'	Report		Stadium: Estadio Nacional; Referee: Saíd Martínez Starting XI: 19 – Rougier; 2 – Cardozo; 5 – Padilla; 6 – Zapata; 8 – Martínez (substituted off) 77'; 10 – Mejía (substituted off) 46'; 12 – Santos; 29 – Auzmendi (substituted off) 77'; 34 – Sacaza; 35 – Meléndez (substituted off) 71'; 77 – Mejía (substituted off) 60'; Substitutes; 38 – Vásquez (substituted on) 46'; 14 – Argueta (substituted on) 60'; 51 – García (substituted on) 71'; 11 – Ledesma (substituted on) 77'; 21 – Gómez (substituted on) 77'
Note: Óscar Padilla scored his first league goal for the club. Rodrigo Auzmendi scored his first league hat-trick for the club. Diego Ledesma made his league debut.

12 February 2025 Week 6	Juticalpa	0–3	Motagua	Danlí
15:00		Report	31' Auzmendi; 87' 90+1' Ledesma	Stadium: Estadio Marcelo Tinoco; Attendance: 1,500; Referee: Arlington Escobar Starting XI: 25 – Licona; 2 – Cardozo; 5 – Padilla; 6 – Zapata; 8 – Martínez (substituted off) 68'; 10 – Mejía (substituted off) 46'; 12 – Santos (substituted off) 89'; 29 – Auzmendi (substituted off) 83'; 34 – Sacaza; 35 – Meléndez; 77 – Mejía (substituted off) 68'; Substitutes; 27 – Macías (substituted on) 46'; 14 – Argueta (substituted on) 68'; 21 – Gómez (substituted on) 68'; 11 – Ledesma (substituted on) 83'; 51 – García (substituted on) 89'
Note: Diego Ledesma scored his first league goal for the club.

15 February 2025 Week 7	Motagua	0–2	Olimpia	Tegucigalpa
19:30		Report	50' (pen.) 57' Bengtson	Stadium: Estadio Nacional; Referee: Nelson Salgado Starting XI: 25 – Licona; 2 – Cardozo; 5 – Padilla (substituted off) 61'; 6 – Zapata (substituted off) 74'; 8 – Martínez (substituted off) 74'; 10 – Mejía (substituted off) 61'; 12 – Santos; 29 – Auzmendi; 34 – Sacaza; 35 – Meléndez (substituted off) 69'; 77 – Mejía; Substitutes; 21 – Gómez (substituted on) 61'; 27 – Macías (substituted on) 61'; 14 – Argueta (substituted on) 69'; 11 – Ledesma (substituted on) 74'; 17 – Portillo (substituted on) 74'

22 February 2025 Week 8	Real España	2–0	Motagua	San Pedro Sula
19:30	Moreno 28'; Velásquez 66'	Report		Stadium: Estadio General Francisco Morazán; Attendance: 1,000; Referee: Luís Mejía Starting XI: 19 – Rougier; 4 – Vega; 11 – Ledesma (substituted off) 70'; 12 – Santos; 15 – Maldonado (substituted off) 46'; 16 – Castellanos; 17 – Portillo (substituted off) 46'; 21 – Gómez; 23 – Jervis (substituted off) 34'; 34 – Sacaza; 77 – Mejía (substituted off) 65'; Substitutes; 27 – Macías (substituted on) 34'; 6 – Zapata (substituted on) 46'; 32 – Núñez (substituted on) 46'; 10 – Mejía (substituted on) 65'; 38 – Vásquez (substituted on) 70'
Note: Alfred Jervis made his league debut.

1 March 2025 Week 9	Motagua	2–1	Victoria	Tegucigalpa
19:30	Ledesma 45+7'; Vásquez 90+1'	Report	73' Delgadillo	Stadium: Estadio Nacional; Attendance: 40; Referee: Armando Castro Starting XI: 25 – Licona; 4 – Vega; 5 – Padilla; 7 – Serrano (substituted off) 67'; 8 – Martínez (substituted off) 82'; 11 – Ledesma (substituted off) 67'; 17 – Portillo; 21 – Gómez (substituted off) 58'; 34 – Sacaza; 35 – Meléndez; 77 – Mejía (substituted off) 58'; Substitutes; 12 – Santos (substituted on) 58'; 27 – Macías (substituted on) 58'; 10 – Mejía (substituted on) 67'; 32 – Núñez (substituted on) 67'; 38 – Vásquez (substituted on) 82'

6 March 2025 Week 10	Real Sociedad	0–0	Motagua	Tocoa
19:30		Report		Stadium: Estadio Francisco Martínez Durón; Attendance: 1,500; Referee: Allan Ordóñez Starting XI: 19 – Rougier; 2 – Cardozo; 5 – Padilla (substituted off) 59'; 7 – Serrano (substituted off) 70'; 8 – Martínez (substituted off) 59'; 11 – Ledesma (substituted off) 70'; 12 – Santos; 17 – Portillo; 34 – Sacaza; 35 – Meléndez; 42 – Argueta (substituted off) 46'; Substitutes; 77 – Mejía (substituted on) 46'; 21 – Gómez (substituted on) 59'; 32 – Núñez (substituted on) 59'; 10 – Mejía (substituted on) 70'; 38 – Vásquez (substituted on) 70'

12 March 2025 Week 11	Motagua	1–0	Olancho	Tegucigalpa
19:30	Mejía 73'	Report		Stadium: Estadio Nacional; Attendance: 5,000; Referee: Melvin Matamoros Starting XI: 19 – Rougier; 4 – Vega; 7 – Serrano; 8 – Martínez (substituted off) 55'; 11 – Ledesma (substituted off) 55'; 12 – Santos; 17 – Portillo; 21 – Gómez (substituted off) 55'; 34 – Sacaza; 35 – Meléndez; 77 – Mejía (substituted off) 79'; Substitutes; 10 – Mejía (substituted on) 55'; 32 – Núñez (substituted on) 55'; 38 – Vásquez (substituted on) 55'; 16 – Castellanos (substituted on) 79'

29 March 2025 Week 12	Marathón	1–1	Motagua	San Pedro Sula
19:30	Vega 73'	Report	90+7' Vásquez	Stadium: Estadio General Francisco Morazán; Referee: Luís Mejía Starting XI: 25 – Licona; 2 – Cardozo; 4 – Vega; 8 – Martínez (substituted off) 61'; 11 – Ledesma (substituted off) 79'; 12 – Santos; 16 – Castellanos (substituted off) 54'; 17 – Portillo; 32 – Núñez (substituted off) 79'; 35 – Meléndez; 77 – Mejía; Substitutes; 26 – Meléndez (substituted on) 54'; 21 – Gómez (substituted on) 61'; 10 – Mejía (substituted on) 79'; 38 – Vásquez (substituted on) 79'

2 April 2025 Week 13	Motagua	4–1	Génesis	Tegucigalpa
19:30	Vega 63'; Cardozo 76'; Serrano 90'; Meléndez 90+3'	Report	48' Hurtado	Stadium: Estadio Nacional; Referee: Julio Güity Starting XI: 25 – Licona; 2 – Cardozo; 4 – Vega; 5 – Padilla (substituted off) 70'; 10 – Mejía (substituted off) 57'; 17 – Portillo; 21 – Gómez; 29 – Auzmendi (substituted off) 88'; 32 – Núñez; 38 – Vásquez (substituted off) 45+1'; 77 – Mejía (substituted off) 71'; Substitutes; 26 – Meléndez (substituted on) 45+1'; 7 – Serrano (substituted on) 57'; 15 – Maldonado (substituted on) 70'; 27 – Macías (substituted on) 71'; 11 – Ledesma (substituted on) 88'
Note: Jonathan Núñez reached 100 league appearances with the club. Sebastián Cardozo scored his first league goal for the club.

7 April 2025 Week 14	UPNFM	2–1	Motagua	Choluteca
19:15	Róchez 15'; Peña 20'	Report	5' Serrano	Stadium: Estadio Emilio Williams Agasse; Referee: Arlington Escobar Starting XI: 19 – Rougier; 2 – Cardozo (substituted off) 76'; 4 – Vega; 7 – Serrano; 12 – Santos (substituted off) 67'; 17 – Portillo; 21 – Gómez; 26 – Meléndez (substituted off) 46'; 29 – Auzmendi; 42 – Argueta (substituted off) 66'; 77 – Mejía (substituted off) 46'; Substitutes; 8 – Martínez (substituted on) 46'; 27 – Macías (substituted on) 46'; 14 – Argueta (substituted on) 66'; 32 – Núñez (substituted on) 67'; 38 – Vásquez (substituted on) 76'
Note: Jonathan Rougier reached 300 official appearances with the club in all tournaments combined.

13 April 2025 Week 15	Motagua	5–1	Juticalpa	Tegucigalpa
17:15	Vega 15' 73'; Auzmendi 80' 81'; Vásquez 89'	Report	49' de Olivera	Stadium: Estadio Nacional; Referee: Raúl Castro Starting XI: 19 – Rougier; 2 – Cardozo; 4 – Vega; 7 – Serrano; 8 – Martínez (substituted off) 65'; 12 – Santos; 17 – Portillo; 22 – Munguía (substituted off) 58'; 26 – Meléndez (substituted off) 82'; 29 – Auzmendi (substituted off) 82'; 35 – Meléndez; Substitutes; 77 – Mejía (substituted on) 58'; 10 – Mejía (substituted on) 65'; 15 – Maldonado (substituted on) 82'; 38 – Vásquez (substituted on) 82'

20 April 2025 Week 16	Olimpia	1–2	Motagua	Tegucigalpa
17:15	Benguché 90+2'	Report	31' 48' Gómez	Stadium: Estadio Nacional; Referee: Armando Castro Starting XI: 25 – Licona; 2 – Cardozo; 4 – Vega; 7 – Serrano (substituted off) 82'; 12 – Santos; 17 – Portillo (substituted off) 82'; 21 – Gómez (substituted off) 79'; 26 – Meléndez (substituted off) 63'; 29 – Auzmendi (substituted off) 46'; 35 – Meléndez; 77 – Mejía (substituted off) 63'; Substitutes; 11 – Ledesma (substituted on) 46'; 16 – Castellanos (substituted on) 63'; 32 – Núñez (substituted on) 63'; 10 – Mejía (substituted on) 79'; 6 – Zapata (substituted on) 82'; 27 – Macías (substituted on) 82'
Note: Héctor Castellanos reached 300 official appearances with the club in all tournaments combined.

26 April 2025 Week 17	Motagua	1–1	Real España	Tegucigalpa
19:30	Auzmendi 80' (pen.)	Report	89' Aparicio	Stadium: Estadio Nacional; Referee: Nelson Salgado Starting XI: 25 – Licona; 2 – Cardozo; 4 – Vega; 6 – Zapata (substituted off) 59'; 7 – Serrano; 12 – Santos; 21 – Gómez (substituted off) 85'; 26 – Meléndez (substituted off) 65'; 35 – Meléndez; 38 – Vásquez (substituted off) 46'; 77 – Mejía (substituted off) 85'; Substitutes; 29 – Auzmendi (substituted on) 46'; 17 – Portillo (substituted on) 59'; 8 – Martínez (substituted on) 65'; 10 – Mejía (substituted on) 85'; 32 – Núñez (substituted on) 85'

3 May 2025 Week 18	Victoria	1–1	Motagua	Olanchito
19:00	Meléndez 30' (o.g.)	Report	55' Vásquez	Stadium: Estadio San Jorge; Referee: Raúl Castro Starting XI: 25 – Licona; 2 – Cardozo; 4 – Vega; 5 – Padilla (substituted off) 46'; 8 – Martínez; 12 – Santos; 17 – Portillo; 27 – Macías (substituted off) 66'; 35 – Meléndez (substituted off) 46'; 38 – Vásquez (substituted off) 73'; 77 – Mejía (substituted off) 87'; Substitutes; 14 – Argueta (substituted on) 46'; 29 – Auzmendi (substituted on) 46'; 10 – Mejía (substituted on) 66'; 11 – Ledesma (substituted on) 73'; 23 – Jervis (substituted on) 87'

7 May 2025 Play-offs	Génesis	1–4	Motagua	Comayagua
17:15	Martínez 45+1'	Report	15' 49' 66' Auzmendi; 86' Mejía	Stadium: Estadio Carlos Miranda; Referee: Raúl Castro Starting XI: 25 – Licona; 2 – Cardozo; 4 – Vega (substituted off) 73'; 6 – Zapata (substituted off) 46'; 7 – Serrano; 12 – Santos; 21 – Gómez (substituted off) 81'; 27 – Macías (substituted off) 46'; 29 – Auzmendi (substituted off) 71'; 35 – Meléndez; 77 – Mejía; Substitutes; 17 – Portillo (substituted on) 46'; 32 – Núñez (substituted on) 46'; 38 – Vásquez (substituted on) 71'; 34 – Sacaza (substituted on) 73'; 8 – Martínez (substituted on) 81'
Note: Rodrigo Auzmendi scored his second league hat-trick.

10 May 2025 Play-offs	Motagua	5–1	Génesis	Tegucigalpa
19:30	Auzmendi 24'; Mejía 31'; Cardozo 41'; Ledesma 76'; Vásquez 86'	Report	83' Hurtado	Stadium: Estadio Nacional; Referee: Luís Mejía Starting XI: 19 – Rougier; 2 – Cardozo (substituted off) 46'; 5 – Padilla; 8 – Martínez; 10 – Mejía; 14 – Argueta; 17 – Portillo (substituted off) 50'; 29 – Auzmendi (substituted off) 46'; 32 – Núñez; 34 – Sacaza; 35 – Meléndez (substituted off) 55'; Substitutes; 12 – Santos (substituted on) 46'; 38 – Vásquez (substituted on) 46'; 6 – Zapata (substituted on) 50'; 51 – García (substituted on) 55' (substituted off) 68'; 11 – Ledesma (substituted on) 68'
Note: Diego Ledesma scored FC Motagua's 100th goal in all official competitions combined this season, breaking their own record from 2014–15 (99).

14 May 2025 Semifinals	Motagua	1–0	Real España	Tegucigalpa
20:00	Mejía 30'	Report		Stadium: Estadio Nacional; Referee: Saíd Martínez Starting XI: 25 – Licona; 2 – Cardozo; 4 – Vega (substituted off) 54'; 6 – Zapata (substituted off) 76'; 7 – Serrano (substituted off) 71'; 12 – Santos; 21 – Gómez (substituted off) 76'; 29 – Auzmendi; 32 – Núñez (substituted off) 71'; 35 – Meléndez; 77 – Mejía (substituted off) 79'; Substitutes; 34 – Sacaza (substituted on) 54'; 10 – Mejía (substituted on) 71'; 26 – Meléndez (substituted on) 71'; 8 – Martínez (substituted on) 76'; 17 – Portillo (substituted on) 76'; 14 – Argueta (substituted on) 79'

17 May 2025 Semifinals	Real España	2–0	Motagua	San Pedro Sula
17:15	Vuelto 17'; Romero 90+5'	Report		Stadium: Estadio General Francisco Morazán; Referee: Armando Castro Starting XI: 25 – Licona; 2 – Cardozo; 4 – Vega; 5 – Padilla (substituted off) 46'; 6 – Zapata (substituted off) 46'; 7 – Serrano (substituted off) 75'; 12 – Santos; 14 – Argueta (substituted off) 34'; 29 – Auzmendi; 35 – Meléndez (substituted off) 75'; 77 – Mejía; Substitutes; 21 – Gómez (substituted on) 34'; 17 – Portillo (substituted on) 46'; 26 – Meléndez (substituted on) 46'; 10 – Mejía (substituted on) 75'; 38 – Vásquez (substituted on) 75'

=== CONCACAF Central American Cup ===
F.C. Motagua qualified to the 2024 CONCACAF Central American Cup as the third best placed non-champion from the 2023–24 domestic league. On 30 October, the club obtained a ticket to the 2025 CONCACAF Champions Cup after defeating Salvadorians C.D. Águila in the play-in stage.

30 July 2024 Group A	Diriangén (Nicaragua)	2–1	(Honduras) Motagua	Diriamba, Nicaragua
18:00	Cano 10'; Copete 89'	Report	63' Vega	Stadium: Estadio Cacique Diriangén; Referee: Jaime Herrera (SLV) Starting XI: 19 – Rougier; 4 – Vega; 6 – Zapata; 7 – Serrano (substituted off) 46'; 9 – Castillo (substituted off) 77'; 11 – Auzmendi (substituted off) 84'; 12 – Santos; 14 – Argueta (substituted off) 58'; 16 – Castellanos; 21 – Gómez; 35 – Meléndez; Substitutes; 10 – Mejía (substituted on) 46'; 5 – Padilla (substituted on) 58'; 32 – Núñez (substituted on) 77'; 29 – Auzmendi (substituted on) 84'
Note: This was the first ever encounter between these two teams. Defender Luis Vega scored his first international goal. Jorge Serrano, Rodrigo Gómez and Rodrigo Auzmendi made their international debuts. Defender Óscar Padilla made his official debut for the club wearing jersey #5.

6 August 2024 Group A	Motagua (Honduras)	3–2	(Panama) San Francisco	Tegucigalpa, Honduras
18:00	Auzmendi 16' 89'; Santos 37'	Report	3' Clarke; 48' Zúniga	Stadium: Estadio Nacional; Referee: Nitzar Sandoval (NCA) Starting XI: 19 – Rougier; 4 – Vega (substituted off) 59'; 7 – Serrano (substituted off) 77'; 9 – Castillo (substituted off) 77'; 10 – Mejía (substituted off) 81'; 11 – Auzmendi; 12 – Santos; 14 – Argueta (substituted off) 81'; 21 – Gómez; 26 – Meléndez; 35 – Meléndez; Substitutes; 5 – Padilla (substituted on) 59'; 8 – Martínez (substituted on) 77'; 29 – Auzmendi (substituted on) 77'; 77 – Mejía (substituted on) 81'; 17 – Portillo (substituted on) 81'
Note: This was the first encounter between these two teams since 2007. Raúl Santos scored his first international goal for the club. Jhen Portillo made his first international appearance.

13 August 2024 Group A	Motagua (Honduras)	4–1	(Panama) Tauro	Tegucigalpa, Honduras
18:00	Castillo 45'; Mejía 59' 63'; Auzmendi 90+2'	Report	81' Velíz	Stadium: Estadio Nacional; Referee: Víctor Rivas (USA) Starting XI: 19 – Rougier; 4 – Vega; 5 – Padilla (substituted off) 68'; 7 – Serrano (substituted off) 77'; 9 – Castillo; 11 – Auzmendi (substituted off) 71'; 12 – Santos; 14 – Argueta (substituted off) 46'; 17 – Portillo; 21 – Gómez (substituted off) 68'; 35 – Meléndez; Substitutes; 10 – Mejía (substituted on) 46'; 8 – Martínez (substituted on) 68'; 16 – Castellanos (substituted on) 68'; 29 – Auzmendi (substituted on) 71'; 77 – Mejía (substituted on) 77'
Note: This was the first encounter between these two teams since 2022. Striker Rodrigo Auzmendi scored his first international goal.

28 August 2024 Group A	Herediano (Costa Rica)	1–1	(Honduras) Motagua	San José, Costa Rica
20:00	Ruiz 54'	Report	29' (pen.) Castillo	Stadium: Estadio Nacional; Referee: Drew Fischer (CAN) Starting XI: 19 – Rougier; 2 – Cardozo; 3 – Meléndez; 5 – Padilla; 9 – Castillo (substituted off) 68'; 10 – Mejía (substituted off) 75'; 11 – Auzmendi (substituted off) 84'; 12 – Santos; 14 – Argueta (substituted off) 82'; 17 – Portillo; 35 – Meléndez; Substitutes; 26 – Meléndez (substituted on) 68'; 21 – Gómez (substituted on) 75'; 32 – Núñez (substituted on) 82'; 29 – Auzmendi (substituted on) 84'
Note: This was the first encounter between these two teams since 2018. F.C. Motagua finished in second place in the group and advanced to the knockout stage. Defender Sebastián Cardozo made his international debut.

25 September 2024 Quarterfinals	Motagua (Honduras)	2–2	(Costa Rica) Herediano	Tegucigalpa, Honduras
20:00	Gómez 3'; Auzmendi 79'	Report	47' González; 90+7' Rubio	Stadium: Estadio Nacional; Referee: Filiberto Martínez (SLV) Starting XI: 19 – Rougier; 2 – Cardozo; 4 – Vega; 9 – Castillo (substituted off) 55'; 10 – Mejía (substituted off) 76'; 11 – Auzmendi; 12 – Santos; 17 – Portillo; 21 – Gómez (substituted off) 71'; 26 – Meléndez (substituted off) 76'; 35 – Meléndez (substituted off) 71'; Substitutes; 77 – Mejía (substituted on) 55'; 8 – Martínez (substituted on) 71'; 14 – Argueta (substituted on) 71'; 7 – Serrano (substituted on) 76'; 29 – Auzmendi (substituted on) 76'

2 October 2024 Quarterfinals	Herediano (Costa Rica)	0–0	(Honduras) Motagua	Cartago, Costa Rica
20:15		Report		Stadium: Estadio José Rafael Fello Meza Ivankovich; Referee: Fernando Hernández (MEX) Starting XI: 25 – Licona; 2 – Cardozo; 3 – Meléndez; 4 – Vega (substituted off) 67'; 7 – Serrano; 11 – Auzmendi (substituted off) 76'; 12 – Santos; 14 – Argueta (substituted off) 76'; 26 – Meléndez (substituted off) 76'; 35 – Meléndez; 77 – Mejía (substituted off) 67'; Substitutes; 9 – Castillo (substituted on) 67'; 17 – Portillo (substituted on) 67'; 29 – Auzmendi (substituted on) 76'; 10 – Mejía (substituted on) 76'; 21 – Gómez (substituted on) 76'

22 October 2024 Play-in	Motagua (Honduras)	2–0	(El Salvador) Águila	Tegucigalpa, Honduras
18:00	Vega 5'; Auzmendi 16'	Report		Stadium: Estadio Nacional; Referee: Mario Escobar (GUA) Starting XI: 25 – Licona; 2 – Cardozo; 4 – Vega; 6 – Zapata; 7 – Serrano (substituted off) 74'; 11 – Auzmendi (substituted off) 74'; 12 – Santos; 14 – Argueta; 21 – Gómez (substituted off) 68'; 26 – Meléndez (substituted off) 68'; 77 – Mejía (substituted off) 79'; Substitutes; 8 – Martínez (substituted on) 68'; 15 – Maldonado (substituted on) 68'; 10 – Mejía (substituted on) 74'; 9 – Castillo (substituted on) 74'; 35 – Meléndez (substituted on) 79'
Note: This was the first official encounter between these two clubs.

30 October 2024 Play-in	Águila (El Salvador)	2–2	(Honduras) Motagua	San Salvador, El Salvador
18:00	Rivas 31'; Medrano 68'	Report	54' Mejía; 64' (pen.) Auzmendi	Stadium: Estadio Cuscatlán; Referee: Keylor Herrera (CRC) Starting XI: 25 – Licona; 2 – Cardozo; 4 – Vega; 6 – Zapata; 7 – Serrano (substituted off) 76'; 11 – Auzmendi (substituted off) 79'; 12 – Santos; 14 – Argueta (substituted off) 46'; 26 – Meléndez (substituted off) 68'; 35 – Meléndez; 77 – Mejía (substituted off) 79'; Substitutes; 3 – Meléndez (substituted on) 46'; 16 – Castellanos (substituted on) 68'; 17 – Portillo (substituted on) 76'; 15 – Maldonado (substituted on) 79'; 29 – Auzmendi (substituted on) 79'
Note: With a 4–2 aggregated score, F.C. Motagua qualified to the 2025 CONCACAF Champions Cup.

=== CONCACAF Champions Cup ===
19 February 2025 Round one	Motagua (Honduras)	1–4	(United States) Cincinnati	Tegucigalpa, Honduras
21:00	Auzmendi 41'	Report	28' 78' Bucha; 49' Denkey; 87' Evander	Stadium: Estadio Nacional; Referee: Bryan López (GUA) Starting XI: 19 – Rougier; 2 – Cardozo; 6 – Zapata (substituted off) 68'; 12 – Santos; 14 – Argueta (substituted off) 31'; 21 – Gómez (substituted off) 67'; 29 – Auzmendi; 32 – Núñez (substituted off) 68'; 34 – Sacaza; 35 – Meléndez; 77 – Mejía (substituted off) 67'; Substitutes; 10 – Mejía (substituted on) 31'; 8 – Martínez (substituted on) 67'; 27 – Macías (substituted on) 67'; 17 – Portillo (substituted on) 68'; 38 – Vásquez (substituted on) 68'
Note: This was the first official encounter between these two clubs. All Giancarlo Sacaza, Jefryn Macías and Mathías Vásquez made their international debuts.

26 February 2025 Round one	Cincinnati (United States)	1–1	(Honduras) Motagua	Cincinnati, United States
18:30 EST	Denkey 19'	Report	10' Auzmendi	Stadium: TQL Stadium; Referee: Víctor Cáceres (MEX) Starting XI: 25 – Licona; 4 – Vega; 6 – Zapata; 8 – Martínez (substituted off) 76'; 10 – Mejía (substituted off) 46'; 12 – Santos; 16 – Castellanos (substituted off) 82'; 29 – Auzmendi (substituted off) 90+2'; 32 – Núñez; 34 – Sacaza; 35 – Meléndez; Substitutes; 77 – Mejía (substituted on) 46'; 7 – Serrano (substituted on) 76'; 26 – Meléndez (substituted on) 82'; 11 – Ledesma (substituted on) 90+2'
Note: Diego Ledesma made his international debut.

== Statistics ==
As of 28 June 2025

Competition	GP	GW	GD	GL	GF	GA	GD	CS	SG	Per
Liga Nacional	44	24	11	9	85	44	+41	13	8	62.88%
CONCACAF Central American Cup	8	3	4	1	15	10	+5	2	1	54.17%
CONCACAF Champions Cup	2	0	1	1	2	5	–3	0	0	16.67%
Others	6	5	1	0	16	4	+12	3	0	88.89%
Totals	60	32	17	11	118	63	+55	18	9	62.78%
