= 2023–24 F.C. Motagua season =

Motagua
2023–24 season
- Chairman: Eduardo Atala
- Managers: Ninrrol Medina; César Vigevani; Diego Vásquez
- Stadium: Estadio Nacional
- Apertura: Finalist
- Clausura: Semifinalist
- CONCACAF Central American Cup: Play-in loss
- Top goalscorer: League: Auzmendi (26); All: Auzmendi (33)
- Average home league attendance: 4,292 (A)
Home colours	Away colours	Third colours
- All statistics correct as of 11 May 2024.

The 2023–24 season was F.C. Motagua's 77th season in existence and the club's 58th consecutive season in the top fight of Honduran football. In addition to the domestic league, the club also competed in the 2023 CONCACAF Central American Cup.

== Overview ==
The club tried to improve their 2022–23 season where they finished title-less. On 5 September, manager Ninrrol Medina was sacked due to poor results and was replaced by Argentinian coach César Vigevani, who was shortly replaced by Diego Vásquez on 26 November due to the same reason. On 3 May, Rubilio Castillo scored his 100th league goal for the club becoming the first ever player to reach that figure.

== Kits ==
The 2023–24 home, away and third kits were published on 27 July.

Manufacturer		Main sponsor	
Joma		Pepsi	
Home	Away	Alternative	Goalkeeper

== Players ==
=== Transfers in ===
Player	Contract date	Moving from
(Honduras) Carlos Argueta	8 May 2023	(Honduras) Vida
(Honduras) Denis Meléndez	8 May 2023	(Honduras) Vida
(Honduras) Riky Zapata	8 May 2023	(Honduras) Real Sociedad
(Honduras) Luis Vega	15 May 2023	(Honduras) Marathón
(Honduras) Yeison Mejía	1 June 2023	(Honduras) Real España
(Argentina) Agustín Auzmendi	12 June 2023	(Honduras) Olancho
(Honduras) Jairo Róchez	21 June 2023	(Honduras) UPNFM
(Honduras) José Escalante	27 June 2023	(Canada) Cavalry
(Honduras) Antony García	27 July 2023	(Honduras) Vida
(Uruguay) José Barreto	7 August 2023	(El Salvador) Santa Tecla
(Honduras) Edwin Munguía	29 November 2023	(Honduras) Vida
(Honduras) Marlon Licona	28 December 2023	(Honduras) Victoria
(Honduras) Cristopher Meléndez	3 January 2024	(Honduras) UPNFM
(Panama) Jorge Serrano	3 January 2024	(Panama) Independiente
(Honduras) Héctor Castellanos	5 January 2024	(Honduras) Olancho
(Argentina) Rodrigo Gómez	26 January 2024	(Bolivia) Independiente Petrolero
(Honduras) Rubilio Castillo	26 January 2024	(China) Nantong Zhiyun
(Argentina) Rodrigo Auzmendi	29 January 2024	(Chile) San Marcos de Arica

=== Transfers out ===
Player	Released date	Moving to
(Paraguay) Roberto Moreira	12 May 2023	(Honduras) Génesis
(Colombia) Santiago Montoya	21 May 2023	TBD
(Honduras) Eddie Hernández	26 May 2023	(India) Mohammedan
(Honduras) Christian Gutiérrez	6 June 2023	TBD
(Argentina) Gaspar Triverio	10 June 2023	(Honduras) Victoria
(Honduras) Héctor Castellanos	14 June 2023	(Honduras) Real España
(Honduras) Diego Rodríguez	19 June 2023	(Honduras) Victoria
(Honduras) Juan Obregón	23 June 2023	(United States) Pittsburgh Riverhounds
(Honduras) Yostin Obando	8 July 2023	(Honduras) Olancho
(Honduras) Cristopher Meléndez	8 July 2023	(Honduras) UPNFM
(Honduras) Marlon Licona	9 August 2023	(Honduras) Victoria
(Honduras) Iván López	26 October 2023	(Honduras) Marathón
(Argentina) Lucas Campana	27 December 2023	(Honduras) Olancho
(Honduras) José Escalante	28 December 2023	TBD
(Honduras) Enrique Facussé	4 January 2024	(Colombia) Internacional
(Honduras) Albert Galindo	4 January 2024	(Honduras) Real Sociedad
(Honduras) Jairo Róchez	5 January 2024	(Honduras) UPNFM
(Honduras) Andy Hernández	8 January 2024	(Honduras) Real Sociedad

=== Squad ===
As of 11 May 2024

- Only league matches into account

No.	Pos.	Player name	Date of birth and age	Games played			Goals scored		
				< 22/23	23/24	Total	< 22/23	23/24	Total
1	GK	(Honduras) Enrique Facussé	30 December 1998 (aged 24)	0	1	1	0	0	0
2	DF	(Honduras) Kevin Álvarez	3 August 1996 (aged 26)	6	27	33	0	1	1
3	DF	(Honduras) Carlos Meléndez	8 December 1997 (aged 25)	44	35	79	4	1	5
4	MF	(Honduras) Luis Vega	28 February 2002 (aged 21)	0	24	24	0	3	3
5	DF	(Honduras) Marcelo Pereira	27 May 1995 (aged 28)	208	10	218	13	1	14
6	DF	(Honduras) Riky Zapata	23 November 1997 (aged 25)	0	26	26	0	0	0
7	MF	(Honduras) Iván López	5 October 1990 (aged 32)	95	11	106	11	1	12
7	MF	(Panama) Jorge Serrano	19 January 1998 (aged 25)	0	17	17	0	1	1
8	MF	(Honduras) Walter Martínez	26 March 1991 (aged 32)	195	42	237	18	5	23
9	FW	(Honduras) Rubilio Castillo	26 November 1991 (aged 31)	175	13	188	99	6	105
10	MF	(Honduras) Yeison Mejía	18 January 1998 (aged 25)	0	35	35	0	7	7
11	FW	(Argentina) Agustín Auzmendi	1 February 1997 (aged 26)	0	41	41	0	26	26
12	MF	(Honduras) Raúl Santos	2 August 1992 (aged 30)	166	36	202	7	0	7
14	MF	(Honduras) Carlos Argueta	6 January 1999 (aged 24)	0	38	38	0	3	3
15	MF	(Honduras) Edwin Maldonado	4 March 1994 (aged 29)	10	31	41	0	0	0
16	MF	(Honduras) Carlos Mejía	19 February 2000 (aged 23)	62	34	96	7	3	10
17	DF	(Honduras) Wesly Decas	11 August 1999 (aged 23)	100	34	134	1	0	1
18	FW	(Argentina) Lucas Campana	9 March 1993 (aged 30)	17	20	37	5	7	12
19	GK	(Argentina) Jonathan Rougier	29 October 1987 (aged 35)	193	42	235	0	1	1
21	MF	(Honduras) José Escalante	29 May 1995 (aged 28)	0	8	8	0	0	0
21	MF	(Argentina) Rodrigo Gómez	2 January 1993 (aged 30)	0	17	17	0	1	1
22	FW	(Honduras) Edwin Munguía	4 May 2006 (aged 17)	0	1	1	0	0	0
23	MF	(Honduras) Juan Delgado	21 July 1992 (aged 30)	94	33	127	6	3	9
24	FW	(Honduras) Antony García	29 October 2004 (aged 18)	0	7	7	0	0	0
25	GK	(Honduras) Marlon Licona	9 February 1991 (aged 32)	141	1	142	0	0	0
26	MF	(Honduras) Denis Meléndez	22 July 1995 (aged 27)	0	26	26	0	1	1
27	FW	(Honduras) Jairo Róchez	5 April 1991 (aged 32)	0	11	11	0	1	1
27	DF	(Honduras) Cristopher Meléndez	25 November 1997 (aged 25)	116	9	125	5	0	5
29	FW	(Honduras) Andy Hernández	15 December 2003 (aged 19)	2	7	9	0	0	0
29	FW	(Argentina) Rodrigo Auzmendi	2 January 2001 (aged 22)	0	7	7	0	1	1
32	MF	(Honduras) Jonathan Núñez	26 November 2001 (aged 21)	81	2	83	3	0	3
33	DF	(Honduras) Albert Galindo	21 October 2001 (aged 21)	10	5	15	0	0	0
33	MF	(Honduras) Héctor Castellanos	28 December 1992 (aged 30)	227	15	242	4	0	4
34	DF	(Honduras) Giancarlos Sacaza	18 January 2004 (aged 19)	1	2	3	0	0	0
38	FW	(Honduras) Mathías Vásquez	15 December 2006 (aged 16)	0	1	1	0	1	1
47	–	(Honduras) Santos Sambulá	29 August 2004 (aged 18)	0	1	1	0	0	0
50	FW	(Honduras) Aaron Barrios	19 October 2004 (aged 18)	4	9	13	0	0	0
51	–	(Honduras) Jordan García	31 March 2006 (aged 17)	0	1	1	0	0	0
Managers		(Honduras) Ninrrol Medina	26 August 1976 (aged 46)	2 February 2023 – 5 September 2023					
Managers		(Argentina) César Vigevani	30 August 1974 (aged 48)	5 September 2023 – 26 November 2023					
Managers		(Argentina) Diego Vásquez	3 July 1971 (aged 51)	26 November 2023 –					

=== Goalkeeper's action ===
As of 11 May 2024

Goalkeeper	Years evaluated	Games	Goals	Per.
(Argentina) Jonathan Rougier	2017–present	235	237	1.009
(Honduras) Marlon Licona	2010–2017, 2018–2023, 2024–present	142	154	1.085
(Honduras) Enrique Facussé	2023–present	1	3	3.000

=== International caps ===
As of 29 October 2023

This is a list of players that were playing for Motagua during the 2023–24 season and were called to represent Honduras at different international competitions.

Player	Team	Event	Caps	Goals
Iván López	Adult	Friendly v Guatemala	1	0
Yeison Mejía	Adult	Friendly v Guatemala	1	0
Marcelo Pereira	Adult	Friendly v Guatemala	1	0
Raúl Santos	Adult	Friendly v Guatemala	1	0
Raúl Santos	Adult	2023 CONCACAF Gold Cup	1	0
Luis Vega	Adult	Friendly v Guatemala	1	0
Luis Vega	U-23	2023 Pan American Games	3	0
Riky Zapata	Adult	2023–24 CONCACAF Nations League	1	0
Riky Zapata	Adult	Friendly v Guatemala	1	0
Enrique Facussé	U-23	2023 Pan American Games	2	0
Antony García	U-23	2023 Pan American Games	3	1
Samuel Elvir	U-23	2023 Central American and Caribbean Games	3	0
Jonathan Núñez	U-23	2023 Central American and Caribbean Games	3	1

== Results ==
All times are local CST unless stated otherwise

=== Preseason and friendlies ===
14 July 2023 Friendly	Comunicaciones (Guatemala)	1–0	(Honduras) Motagua	Jonesboro, United States
19:00 EST	Fracchia 80'			Stadium: Tara Stadium; Referee: Starting XI: 19 – Rougier; 2 – Álvarez; 5 – Pereira; 7 – López; 10 – Mejía; 11 – Auzmendi; 12 – Santos; 16 – Mejía; 21 – Escalante; 23 – Delgado; 26 – Meléndez

16 July 2023 Friendly	Motagua (Honduras)	2–3	(Guatemala) Municipal	Charlotte, United States
17:30 EST	Auzmendi 70'; López 90+3'		59' Archila; 78' Fuentes; 90' Altán	Stadium: RRHS Stadium; Referee: Starting XI: 25 – Licona; 2 – Álvarez; 5 – Pereira; 8 – Martínez; 14 – Argueta; 16 – Mejía; 18 – Campana; 21 – Escalante; 23 – Delgado; 26 – Meléndez; 27 – Róchez

21 July 2023 Friendly	Comunicaciones (Guatemala)	1–2	(Honduras) Motagua	Hartford, United States
19:00 EST	López 40'		21' Mejía; 90' Auzmendi	Stadium: Trinity Health Stadium; Referee: Starting XI: 1 – Facussé; 2 – Álvarez; 5 – Pereira; 7 – López; 10 – Mejía; 11 – Auzmendi; 12 – Santos; 16 – Mejía; 21 – Escalante; 26 – Meléndez; 29 – Hernández

23 July 2023 Friendly	Motagua	1–1	Olimpia	Chester, United States
18:30 EST	Delgado 63'		58' Benguché	Stadium: Subaru Park; Referee: Starting XI: 19 – Rougier; 5 – Pereira; 7 – López; 10 – Mejía; 11 – Auzmendi; 12 – Santos; 14 – Argueta; 16 – Mejía; 21 – Escalante; 26 – Meléndez; 29 – Hernández (substituted off) 35'; Substitutes; 23 – Delgado (substituted on) 35'

=== Apertura ===
30 July 2023 Week 1	Motagua	1–1	UPNFM	Tegucigalpa
16:00	Pereira 84'	Report	41' Róchez	Stadium: Estadio Nacional; Referee: Armando Castro Starting XI: 19 – Rougier; 2 – Álvarez; 5 – Pereira; 7 – López; 11 – Auzmendi; 16 – Mejía (substituted off) 71'; 21 – Escalante (substituted off) 60'; 23 – Delgado (substituted off) 46'; 27 – Róchez (substituted off) 60'; 32 – Núñez (substituted off) 13'; 33 – Galindo; Substitutes; 15 – Maldonado (substituted on) 13'; 8 – Martínez (substituted on) 46'; 6 – Zapata (substituted on) 60'; 14 – Argueta (substituted on) 60'; 18 – Campana (substituted on) 71'
Note: Agustín Auzmendi, José Escalante, Jairo Róchez, Riky Zapata and Carlos Argueta made their official debuts for the club

5 August 2023 Week 2	Génesis	0–0	Motagua	Comayagua
15:00		Report		Stadium: Estadio Carlos Miranda; Referee: Julio Güity Starting XI: 19 – Rougier; 2 – Álvarez; 5 – Pereira; 6 – Zapata; 7 – López (substituted off) 57'; 8 – Martínez (substituted off) 73'; 10 – Mejía (substituted off) 73'; 11 – Auzmendi (substituted off) 78'; 12 – Santos; 14 – Argueta (substituted off) 46'; 23 – Delgado; Substitutes; 16 – Mejía (substituted on) 46'; 27 – Róchez (substituted on) 57'; 29 – Hernández (substituted on) 73'; 15 – Maldonado (substituted on) 73'; 50 – Barrios (substituted on) 78'
Note: Midfielder Yeison Mejía made his league debut for the club wearing jersey #10.

13 August 2023 Week 3	Motagua	3–0	Marathón	Tegucigalpa
17:00	López 42'; Mejía 53'; Meléndez 90+1'	Report		Stadium: Estadio Nacional; Referee: Melvin Matamoros Starting XI: 19 – Rougier; 2 – Álvarez; 5 – Pereira (substituted off) 63'; 6 – Zapata; 7 – López (substituted off) 63'; 8 – Martínez (substituted off) 64'; 10 – Mejía (substituted off) 78'; 11 – Auzmendi; 12 – Santos; 23 – Delgado; 29 – Hernández (substituted off) 46'; Substitutes; 16 – Mejía (substituted on) 46'; 27 – Róchez (substituted on) 63'; 4 – Vega (substituted on) 63'; 26 – Meléndez (substituted on) 64'; 21 – Escalante (substituted on) 78'
Note: Midfielder Denis Meléndez scored his first goal in his first ever league appearance for the club. Also, midfielder Luis Vega made his official F.C. Motagua's debut. And, midfielder Yeison Mejía scored his first league goal.

20 August 2023 Week 4	Vida	3–3	Motagua	La Ceiba
18:00	Tellas 36' (pen.); Canales 47'; Colón 49'	Report	38' Mejía; 40' Róchez; 74' (o.g.) Bernárdez	Stadium: Estadio Nilmo Edwards; Referee: Raúl Castro Starting XI: 1 – Facussé; 3 – Meléndez; 4 – Vega; 8 – Martínez; 14 – Argueta (substituted off) 58'; 15 – Maldonado; 16 – Mejía; 21 – Escalante (substituted off) 58'; 27 – Róchez (substituted off) 67'; 33 – Galindo (substituted off) 58'; 50 – Barrios (substituted off) 67'; Substitutes; 6 – Zapata (substituted on) 58'; 10 – Mejía (substituted on) 58'; 12 – Santos (substituted on) 58'; 11 – Auzmendi (substituted on) 67'; 7 – López (substituted on) 67'
Note: Goalkeeper Enrique Facussé made his professional debut for the club. Forward Jairo Róchez scored his first ever goal for F.C. Motagua.

26 August 2023 Week 5	Motagua	0–2	Olimpia	Tegucigalpa
19:00		Report	38' 50' Arboleda	Stadium: Estadio Nacional; Referee: Jefferson Escobar Starting XI: 19 – Rougier; 2 – Álvarez (substituted off) 80'; 5 – Pereira; 6 – Zapata (substituted off) 80'; 7 – López; 10 – Mejía; 11 – Auzmendi; 12 – Santos; 16 – Mejía (substituted off) 54'; 23 – Delgado; 26 – Meléndez (substituted off) 54'; Substitutes; 18 – Campana (substituted on) 54'; 8 – Martínez (substituted on) 54'; 3 – Meléndez (substituted on) 80'; 4 – Vega (substituted on) 80'
Note: Midfielders Iván López and Walter Martínez reached 100 and 200 league matches respectively.

3 September 2023 Week 6	Real España	3–3	Motagua	San Pedro Sula
17:00	Vuelto 13'; Rocca 50' 90+1'	Report	31' Auzmendi; 45+2' Campana; 55' Martínez	Stadium: Estadio Olímpico Metropolitano; Referee: Saíd Martínez Starting XI: 19 – Rougier; 3 – Meléndez; 8 – Martínez; 11 – Auzmendi (substituted off) 85'; 14 – Argueta (substituted off) 76'; 15 – Maldonado (substituted off) 61'; 16 – Mejía (substituted off) 85'; 17 – Decas; 18 – Campana (substituted off) 76'; 26 – Meléndez; 33 – Galindo; Substitutes; 23 – Delgado (substituted on) 61'; 34 – Sacaza (substituted on) 76'; 27 – Róchez (substituted on) 76'; 50 – Barrios (substituted on) 85'; 47 – Sambulá (substituted on) 85'
Note: Youngster Santos Sambulá made his professional debut with the club wearing jersey #47. This was the last game for manager Ninrrol Medina as he was sacked 2 days later due to poor results.

13 September 2023 Week 7	Motagua	1–0	Olancho	Danlí
18:00	Martínez 52'	Report		Stadium: Estadio Marcelo Tinoco; Referee: Héctor Rodríguez Starting XI: 19 – Rougier; 3 – Meléndez; 5 – Pereira; 8 – Martínez; 11 – Auzmendi (substituted off) 90+8'; 14 – Argueta; 15 – Maldonado (substituted off) 67'; 16 – Mejía (substituted off) 67'; 17 – Decas; 18 – Campana (substituted off) 77'; 26 – Meléndez; Substitutes; 23 – Delgado (substituted on) 67'; 21 – Escalante (substituted on) 77'; 27 – Róchez (substituted on) 77'; 34 – Sacaza (substituted on) 90+8'
Note: This match was moved to Danlí as the Estadio Nacional was unavailable. Coach César Vigevani directed his first game as new appointed F.C. Motagua's manager. Midfielder Juan Delgado reached 100 league games with the club.

16 September 2023 Week 8	Motagua	0–0	Real Sociedad	Tegucigalpa
19:00		Report		Stadium: Estadio Nacional; Referee: Raúl Castro Starting XI: 19 – Rougier; 5 – Pereira; 7 – López; 11 – Auzmendi; 12 – Santos; 14 – Argueta; 16 – Mejía (substituted off) 67'; 17 – Decas; 18 – Campana (substituted off) 67'; 23 – Delgado; 26 – Meléndez; Substitutes; 24 – García (substituted on) 67'; 27 – Róchez (substituted on) 67'
Note: Goalkeeper Jonathan Rougier reached 200 league games with the club. Youngster Antony García made his professional debut wearing jersey #24.

20 September 2023 Week 9	Victoria	0–4	Motagua	La Ceiba
18:00		Report	23' Campana; 33' 38' 57' Auzmendi	Stadium: Estadio Nilmo Edwards; Referee: José Valladares Starting XI: 19 – Rougier; 3 – Meléndez; 8 – Martínez (substituted off) 72'; 11 – Auzmendi (substituted off) 72'; 12 – Santos; 14 – Argueta; 17 – Decas (substituted off) 72'; 18 – Campana (substituted off) 61'; 23 – Delgado; 24 – García; 26 – Meléndez (substituted off) 65'; Substitutes; 7 – López (substituted on) 61'; 16 – Mejía (substituted on) 65'; 21 – Escalante (substituted on) 72'; 27 – Róchez (substituted on) 72'; 4 – Vega (substituted on) 72'
Note: Forward Agustín Auzmendi scored his first league hat-trick.

8 November 2023 Week 10	UPNFM	1–4	Motagua	Choluteca
20:00	Jean-Baptiste 31'	Report	4' 63' Auzmendi; 29' Campana; 38' (o.g.) Bernárdez	Stadium: Estadio Emilio Williams Agasse; Referee: Nelson Salgado Starting XI: 19 – Rougier; 2 – Álvarez (substituted off) 74'; 3 – Meléndez; 5 – Pereira; 8 – Martínez; 10 – Mejía (substituted off) 68'; 11 – Auzmendi (substituted off) 74'; 17 – Decas; 18 – Campana (substituted off) 68'; 23 – Delgado; 24 – García (substituted off) 12'; Substitutes; 15 – Maldonado (substituted on) 12'; 29 – Hernández (substituted on) 68'; 16 – Mejía (substituted on) 68'; 50 – Barrios (substituted on) 74'; 14 – Argueta (substituted on) 74'

29 September 2023 Week 11	Motagua	1–0	Génesis	Tegucigalpa
19:00	Campana 82'	Report		Stadium: Estadio Nacional; Referee: Jefferson Escobar Starting XI: 19 – Rougier; 3 – Meléndez; 4 – Vega; 7 – López; 12 – Santos (substituted off) 76'; 14 – Argueta; 15 – Maldonado (substituted off) 46'; 16 – Mejía (substituted off) 46'; 17 – Decas; 24 – García (substituted off) 46'; 27 – Róchez (substituted off) 46'; Substitutes; 11 – Auzmendi (substituted on) 46'; 23 – Delgado (substituted on) 46'; 18 – Campana (substituted on) 46'; 10 – Mejía (substituted on) 46'; 8 – Martínez (substituted on) 76'

7 October 2023 Week 12	Marathón	2–1	Motagua	San Pedro Sula
15:00	Elvir 67'; Guevara 70'	Report	53' Auzmendi	Stadium: Estadio Yankel Rosenthal; Referee: Nelson Salgado Starting XI: 19 – Rougier; 3 – Meléndez; 7 – López (substituted off) 78'; 8 – Martínez; 10 – Mejía (substituted off) 74'; 11 – Auzmendi; 12 – Santos; 14 – Argueta; 17 – Decas (substituted off) 74'; 23 – Delgado; 26 – Meléndez (substituted off) 58'; Substitutes; 15 – Maldonado (substituted on) 58' (substituted off) 74'; 24 – García (substituted on) 74'; 18 – Campana (substituted on) 74'; 6 – Zapata (substituted on) 74'; 16 – Mejía (substituted on) 78'

18 October 2023 Week 13	Motagua	3–0	Vida	Tegucigalpa
20:00	Auzmendi 25' 90+1'; Campana 30' (pen.)	Report		Stadium: Estadio Nacional; Referee: Armando Castro Starting XI: 19 – Rougier; 3 – Meléndez; 5 – Pereira; 6 – Zapata (substituted off) 62'; 8 – Martínez (substituted off) 62'; 10 – Mejía (substituted off) 82'; 11 – Auzmendi; 12 – Santos (substituted off) 77'; 14 – Argueta; 18 – Campana (substituted off) 62'; 23 – Delgado; Substitutes; 26 – Meléndez (substituted on) 62'; 7 – López (substituted on) 62'; 17 – Decas (substituted on) 62'; 4 – Vega (substituted on) 77'; 29 – Hernández (substituted on) 82'

22 October 2023 Week 14	Olimpia	3–0	Motagua	Tegucigalpa
17:00	Álvarez 20'; Pinto 41' 82'	Report		Stadium: Estadio Nacional; Referee: Melvin Matamoros Starting XI: 19 – Rougier; 3 – Meléndez; 5 – Pereira; 6 – Zapata; 8 – Martínez (substituted off) 46'; 10 – Mejía; 11 – Auzmendi; 12 – Santos; 14 – Argueta (substituted off) 69'; 23 – Delgado; 26 – Meléndez (substituted off) 49'; Substitutes; 7 – López (substituted on) 46'; 15 – Maldonado (substituted on) 49'; 18 – Campana (substituted on) 69'

28 October 2023 Week 15	Motagua	4–1	Real España	Tegucigalpa
19:00	Auzmendi 31'; Mejía 35'; Campana 69'; Mejía 84'	Report	66' Villa	Stadium: Estadio Nacional; Referee: Saíd Martínez Starting XI: 19 – Rougier; 5 – Pereira (substituted off) 30'; 6 – Zapata (substituted off) 49'; 8 – Martínez (substituted off) 74'; 10 – Mejía (substituted off) 75'; 11 – Auzmendi; 12 – Santos; 14 – Argueta; 15 – Maldonado; 18 – Campana (substituted off) 79'; 23 – Delgado; Substitutes; 17 – Decas (substituted on) 30'; 33 – Galindo (substituted on) 49'; 2 – Álvarez (substituted on) 74'; 29 – Hernández (substituted on) 75'; 16 – Mejía (substituted on) 79'

5 November 2023 Week 16	Olancho	0–1	Motagua	Juticalpa
19:00		Report	24' (pen.) Auzmendi	Stadium: Estadio Juan Ramón Brevé Vargas; Referee: Jefferson Escobar Starting XI: 19 – Rougier; 2 – Álvarez; 3 – Meléndez; 6 – Zapata (substituted off) 46'; 10 – Mejía (substituted off) 81'; 11 – Auzmendi (substituted off) 90+3'; 12 – Santos; 15 – Maldonado; 18 – Campana (substituted off) 71'; 23 – Delgado; 24 – García (substituted off) 46'; Substitutes; 14 – Argueta (substituted on) 46'; 17 – Decas (substituted on) 46'; 4 – Vega (substituted on) 71'; 16 – Mejía (substituted on) 81'; 50 – Barrios (substituted on) 90+3'

12 November 2023 Week 17	Real Sociedad	3–2	Motagua	Tocoa
17:00	González 71'; Vega 73'; Rocha 86'	Report	22' 78' Auzmendi	Stadium: Estadio Francisco Martínez Durón; Referee: Armando Castro Starting XI: 19 – Rougier; 2 – Álvarez; 3 – Meléndez; 8 – Martínez; 10 – Mejía; 11 – Auzmendi; 12 – Santos; 15 – Maldonado (substituted off) 46'; 17 – Decas (substituted off) 74'; 18 – Campana (substituted off) 62'; 23 – Delgado; Substitutes; 6 – Zapata (substituted on) 46'; 50 – Barrios (substituted on) 62'; 16 – Mejía (substituted on) 74'

25 November 2023 Week 18	Motagua	1–3	Victoria	Tegucigalpa
17:00	Auzmendi 37' (pen.)	Report	7' (pen.) Vega; 27' Aranda; 78' Rodríguez	Stadium: Estadio Nacional; Referee: Raúl Castro Starting XI: 19 – Rougier; 2 – Álvarez; 3 – Meléndez; 6 – Zapata (substituted off) 67'; 8 – Martínez; 10 – Mejía (substituted off) 77'; 11 – Auzmendi; 12 – Santos; 16 – Mejía; 18 – Campana; 23 – Delgado; Substitutes; 21 – Escalante (substituted on) 67'; 50 – Barrios (substituted on) 77'
Note: After 18 rounds, F.C. Motagua finished in third place and qualified to the Play-offs stage. Coach César Vigevani was separated one day after this match and was replaced by former manager Diego Vásquez.

30 November 2023 Play-offs	Olancho	2–2	Motagua	Juticalpa
19:00	Abbott 14'; Tejeda 37'	Report	12' Campana; 65' Mejía	Stadium: Estadio Juan Ramón Brevé Vargas; Referee: Saíd Martínez Starting XI: 19 – Rougier; 2 – Álvarez; 3 – Meléndez (substituted off) 46'; 8 – Martínez; 10 – Mejía (substituted off) 86'; 11 – Auzmendi (substituted off) 90+6'; 15 – Maldonado; 17 – Decas; 18 – Campana (substituted off) 46'; 26 – Meléndez; 33 – Galindo; Substitutes; 14 – Argueta (substituted on) 46'; 6 – Zapata (substituted on) 46'; 16 – Mejía (substituted on) 86'; 50 – Barrios (substituted on) 90+6'
Note: This was the first ever encounter between these two clubs in a post-season match. Manager Diego Vásquez returned to the club as new coach.

3 December 2023 Play-offs	Motagua	1–1 (3–0 p)	Olancho	Tegucigalpa
19:00	Argueta 83'	Report	71' Monico	Stadium: Estadio Nacional; Referee: Melvin Matamoros Starting XI: 19 – Rougier; 2 – Álvarez (substituted off) 62'; 3 – Meléndez; 8 – Martínez; 10 – Mejía; 11 – Auzmendi; 12 – Santos; 15 – Maldonado (substituted off) 46'; 17 – Decas; 18 – Campana (substituted off) 72'; 23 – Delgado; Substitutes; 16 – Mejía (substituted on) 46' (substituted off) 77'; 14 – Argueta (substituted on) 62'; 6 – Zapata (substituted on) 72'; 21 – Escalante (substituted on) 77'
Note: F.C. Motagua qualified to the semifinals after a 3–0 win on penalty shoot-outs.

6 December 2023 Semifinals	Motagua	2–1	Marathón	Tegucigalpa
19:00	Auzmendi 18' (pen.) 56'	Report	49' Castillo	Stadium: Estadio Nacional; Referee: Nelson Salgado Starting XI: 19 – Rougier; 3 – Meléndez; 8 – Martínez (substituted off) 83'; 10 – Mejía (substituted off) 61'; 11 – Auzmendi; 12 – Santos; 14 – Argueta (substituted off) 82'; 15 – Maldonado (substituted off) 82'; 17 – Decas; 18 – Campana (substituted off) 67'; 23 – Delgado; Substitutes; 2 – Álvarez (substituted on) 61'; 21 – Escalante (substituted on) 67'; 29 – Hernández (substituted on) 82'; 26 – Meléndez (substituted on) 82'; 27 – Róchez (substituted on) 83'

9 December 2023 Semifinals	Marathón	2–2	Motagua	San Pedro Sula
15:00	Zúniga 78' (pen.) 87'	Report	33' Mejía; 45+2' Delgado	Stadium: Estadio Yankel Rosenthal; Referee: Selvin Brown Starting XI: 19 – Rougier; 2 – Álvarez; 3 – Meléndez; 8 – Martínez (substituted off) 67'; 10 – Mejía (substituted off) 76'; 11 – Auzmendi (substituted off) 88'; 12 – Santos; 14 – Argueta (substituted off) 88'; 15 – Maldonado; 17 – Decas; 23 – Delgado; Substitutes; 26 – Meléndez (substituted on) 67'; 29 – Hernández (substituted on) 76'; 27 – Róchez (substituted on) 88'; 18 – Campana (substituted on) 88'
Note: F.C. Motagua qualified to the finals after a 4–3 aggregated score.

17 December 2023 Final	Motagua	0–0	Olimpia	Tegucigalpa
17:00		Report		Stadium: Estadio Nacional; Referee: Nelson Salgado Starting XI: 19 – Rougier; 2 – Álvarez; 3 – Meléndez; 6 – Zapata; 8 – Martínez; 10 – Mejía; 11 – Auzmendi; 12 – Santos; 14 – Argueta (substituted off) 81'; 17 – Decas; 23 – Delgado; Substitutes; 24 – García (substituted on) 81'

21 December 2023 Final	Olimpia	2–1	Motagua	Tegucigalpa
18:00	Bengtson 48'; Arboleda 90+2'	Report	11' Delgado	Stadium: Estadio Nacional; Referee: Saíd Martínez Starting XI: 19 – Rougier; 2 – Álvarez (substituted off) 90+4'; 3 – Meléndez; 6 – Zapata (substituted off) 67'; 8 – Martínez; 10 – Mejía; 11 – Auzmendi; 12 – Santos; 14 – Argueta; 17 – Decas; 23 – Delgado; Substitutes; 15 – Maldonado (substituted on) 67'; 11 – Campana (substituted on) 90+4'
Note: with a 1–2 aggregated score, F.C. Motagua failed to obtain the title.

=== Clausura ===
21 January 2024 Week 1	Motagua	2–2	Olancho	Tegucigalpa
19:00	Martínez 55'; Mejía 72'	Report	10' Monico; 42' Altamirano	Stadium: Estadio Nacional; Referee: Raúl Castro Starting XI: 19 – Rougier; 3 – Meléndez; 7 – Serrano; 8 – Martínez (substituted off) 86'; 10 – Mejía; 12 – Santos; 14 – Argueta (substituted off) 69'; 17 – Decas; 23 – Delgado (substituted off) 46'; 33 – Castellanos; 50 – Barrios (substituted off) 46'; Substitutes; 2 – Álvarez (substituted on) 46'; 21 – Gómez (substituted on) 46'; 16 – Mejía (substituted on) 69'; 26 – Meléndez (substituted on) 86'
Note: Panamanian Jorge Serrano and Argentinian Rodrigo Gómez made their debuts with F.C. Motagua.

27 January 2024 Week 2	Real España	3–1	Motagua	San Pedro Sula
18:00	Mejía 2'; Vuelto 28'; Benavídez 54'	Report	15' Mejía	Stadium: Estadio Olímpico Metropolitano; Attendance: 1,000; Referee: Jefferson Escobar Starting XI: 19 – Rougier; 2 – Álvarez (substituted off) 71'; 3 – Meléndez; 7 – Serrano (substituted off) 71'; 8 – Martínez (substituted off) 65'; 10 – Mejía; 11 – Auzmendi; 12 – Santos; 17 – Decas; 23 – Delgado (substituted off) 45+4'; 33 – Castellanos (substituted off) 76'; Substitutes; 21 – Gómez (substituted on) 45+4'; 16 – Mejía (substituted on) 65'; 14 – Argueta (substituted on) 71'; 26 – Meléndez (substituted on) 71'; 15 – Maldonado (substituted on) 76'

31 January 2024 Week 3	Motagua	3–0	Victoria	Danlí
17:00	Auzmendi 15' (pen.); Delgado 67'; Mejía 81'	Report		Stadium: Estadio Marcelo Tinoco; Attendance: 2,000; Referee: Melvin Matamoros Starting XI: 19 – Rougier; 3 – Meléndez; 4 – Vega; 6 – Zapata (substituted off) 81'; 10 – Mejía (substituted off) 71'; 11 – Auzmendi (substituted off) 81'; 12 – Santos; 14 – Argueta (substituted off) 57'; 15 – Maldonado; 21 – Gómez (substituted off) 71'; 23 – Delgado; Substitutes; 16 – Mejía (substituted on) 57'; 7 – Serrano (substituted on) 71'; 8 – Martínez (substituted on) 71'; 22 – Munguía (substituted on) 81'; 17 – Decas (substituted on) 81'
Note: Forward Edwin Munguía made his F.C. Motagua's debut wearing jersey #22.

4 February 2024 Week 4	Génesis	0–1	Motagua	Comayagua
19:00		Report	24' Rougier	Stadium: Estadio Carlos Miranda; Referee: Kelvin Pineda Starting XI: 19 – Rougier; 3 – Meléndez; 4 – Vega; 6 – Zapata (substituted off) 46'; 10 – Mejía (substituted off) 63'; 11 – Auzmendi; 12 – Santos; 15 – Maldonado (substituted off) 43'; 21 – Gómez (substituted off) 77'; 23 – Delgado (substituted off) 64'; 27 – Meléndez; Substitutes; 33 – Castellanos (substituted on) 43'; 17 – Decas (substituted on) 46'; 16 – Mejía (substituted on) 63'; 7 – Serrano (substituted on) 64'; 8 – Martínez (substituted on) 77'
Note: Goalkeeper Jonathan Rougier scored his first goal for F.C. Motagua.

11 February 2024 Week 5	Motagua	2–0	Marathón	Tegucigalpa
17:00	Mejía 34'; Martínez 63'	Report		Stadium: Estadio Nacional; Referee: Selvin Brown Starting XI: 19 – Rougier; 3 – Meléndez; 4 – Vega; 8 – Martínez (substituted off) 83'; 10 – Mejía (substituted off) 70'; 11 – Auzmendi (substituted off) 83'; 12 – Santos; 16 – Mejía (substituted off) 70'; 17 – Decas; 23 – Delgado; 33 – Castellanos (substituted off) 77'; Substitutes; 14 – Argueta (substituted on) 70'; 7 – Serrano (substituted on) 70'; 15 – Maldonado (substituted on) 77'; 29 – Auzmendi (substituted on) 83'; 21 – Gómez (substituted on) 83'
Note: Forward Rodrigo Auzmendi made his debut with the club wearing jersey #29. He is the brother of Agustín Auzmendi.

18 February 2024 Week 6	UPNFM	0–2	Motagua	Choluteca
15:00		Report	8' (pen.) 40' Auzmendi	Stadium: Estadio Emilio Williams Agasse; Referee: Armando Castro Starting XI: 19 – Rougier; 3 – Meléndez (substituted off) 67'; 4 – Vega; 8 – Martínez; 10 – Mejía (substituted off) 67'; 11 – Auzmendi (substituted off) 73'; 12 – Santos; 16 – Mejía (substituted off) 67'; 17 – Decas; 23 – Delgado; 33 – Castellanos (substituted off) 73'; Substitutes; 14 – Argueta (substituted on) 67'; 7 – Serrano (substituted on) 67'; 2 – Álvarez (substituted on) 67'; 15 – Maldonado (substituted on) 73'; 9 – Castillo (substituted on) 73'

24 February 2024 Week 7	Motagua	0–2	Olimpia	Tegucigalpa
18:00		Report	44' Chirinos; 89' Arboleda	Stadium: Estadio Nacional; Referee: Armando Castro Starting XI: 19 – Rougier; 3 – Meléndez; 4 – Vega; 8 – Martínez (substituted off) 80'; 10 – Mejía (substituted off) 64'; 11 – Auzmendi (substituted off) 73'; 12 – Santos; 16 – Mejía (substituted off) 46'; 17 – Decas (substituted off) 64'; 23 – Delgado (substituted off) 72'; 33 – Castellanos; Substitutes; 9 – Castillo (substituted on) 46'; 7 – Serrano (substituted on) 64'; 6 – Zapata (substituted on) 64'; 21 – Gómez (substituted on) 72'; 14 – Argueta (substituted on) 80'

28 February 2024 Week 8	Real Sociedad	1–3	Motagua	Tocoa
18:00	Reyes 56'	Report	43' Martínez; 80' 90+5' Argueta	Stadium: Estadio Francisco Martínez Durón; Referee: Héctor Rodríguez Starting XI: 25 – Licona; 2 – Álvarez; 3 – Meléndez; 4 – Vega (substituted off) 71'; 7 – Serrano (substituted off) 71'; 8 – Martínez; 11 – Auzmendi; 12 – Santos; 16 – Mejía (substituted off) 82'; 17 – Decas; 23 – Delgado (substituted off) 76'; Substitutes; 14 – Argueta (substituted on) 71'; 27 – Meléndez (substituted on) 71'; 26 – Meléndez (substituted on) 76'; 15 – Maldonado (substituted on) 82'

3 March 2024 Week 9	Motagua	1–0	Vida	Tegucigalpa
18:00	Castillo 37' (pen.)	Report		Stadium: Estadio Nacional; Referee: Saíd Martínez Starting XI: 19 – Rougier; 2 – Álvarez; 3 – Meléndez (substituted off) 46'; 8 – Martínez; 9 – Castillo (substituted off) 81'; 11 – Auzmendi (substituted off) 75'; 12 – Santos; 17 – Decas; 21 – Gómez (substituted off) 61'; 27 – Meléndez; 51 – García (substituted off) 61'; Substitutes; 33 – Castellanos (substituted on) 46'; 16 – Mejía (substituted on) 61'; 26 – Meléndez (substituted on) 61'; 7 – Serrano (substituted on) 75'; 29 – Auzmendi (substituted on) 81'
Note: Rubilio Castillo scored his 100th league goal for F.C. Motagua. Youngster Jordan García made his professional debut with the club.

10 March 2024 Week 10	Olancho	0–0	Motagua	Juticalpa
15:00		Report		Stadium: Estadio Juan Ramón Brevé Vargas; Referee: Nelson Salgado Starting XI: 19 – Rougier; 3 – Meléndez; 4 – Vega; 8 – Martínez (substituted off) 71'; 9 – Castillo (substituted off) 46'; 11 – Auzmendi; 12 – Santos; 14 – Argueta (substituted off) 78'; 17 – Decas; 23 – Delgado (substituted off) 46'; 33 – Castellanos (substituted off) 65'; Substitutes; 16 – Mejía (substituted on) 46'; 26 – Meléndez (substituted on) 46'; 15 – Maldonado (substituted on) 65'; 21 – Gómez (substituted on) 71'; 10 – Mejía (substituted on) 78'

10 April 2024 Week 11	Motagua	1–1	Real España	Tegucigalpa
19:00	Auzmendi 25'	Report	18' Félix	Stadium: Estadio Nacional; Referee: Nelson Salgado Starting XI: 19 – Rougier; 3 – Meléndez; 4 – Vega (substituted off) 62'; 8 – Martínez; 9 – Castillo (substituted off) 86'; 10 – Mejía (substituted off) 46'; 11 – Auzmendi; 15 – Maldonado; 16 – Mejía (substituted off) 67'; 17 – Decas; 27 – Meléndez; Substitutes; 26 – Meléndez (substituted on) 46' (substituted off) 67'; 6 – Zapata (substituted on) 62'; 14 – Argueta (substituted on) 67'; 21 – Gómez (substituted on) 67'; 29 – Auzmendi (substituted on) 86'

30 March 2024 Week 12	Victoria	2–2	Motagua	La Ceiba
19:15	Banegas 58' (pen.); Hurtado 65'	Report	6' Auzmendi; 90+5' Castillo	Stadium: Estadio Nilmo Edwards; Referee: Luís Mejía Starting XI: 19 – Rougier; 2 – Álvarez (substituted off) 81'; 4 – Vega; 6 – Zapata; 8 – Martínez; 10 – Mejía (substituted off) 82'; 11 – Auzmendi; 15 – Maldonado (substituted off) 57'; 16 – Mejía (substituted off) 67'; 26 – Meléndez (substituted off) 67'; 27 – Meléndez; Substitutes; 33 – Castellanos (substituted on) 57'; 9 – Castillo (substituted on) 67'; 21 – Gómez (substituted on) 67'; 14 – Argueta (substituted on) 81'; 7 – Serrano (substituted on) 82'

3 April 2024 Week 13	Motagua	0–0	Génesis	Tegucigalpa
19:30		Report		Stadium: Estadio Nacional; Referee: José Valladares Starting XI: 19 – Rougier; 4 – Vega; 8 – Martínez (substituted off) 86'; 9 – Castillo (substituted off) 71'; 11 – Auzmendi; 12 – Santos; 14 – Argueta (substituted off) 71'; 17 – Decas; 21 – Gómez (substituted off) 71'; 23 – Delgado (substituted off) 63'; 33 – Castellanos; Substitutes; 16 – Mejía (substituted on) 63'; 2 – Álvarez (substituted on) 71'; 29 – Auzmendi (substituted on) 71'; 10 – Mejía (substituted on) 71'; 26 – Meléndez (substituted on) 86'

7 April 2024 Week 14	Marathón	1–1	Motagua	San Pedro Sula
15:00	Vega 9'	Report	47' Castillo	Stadium: Estadio Yankel Rosenthal; Referee: Raúl Castro Starting XI: 19 – Rougier; 2 – Álvarez; 3 – Meléndez; 4 – Vega; 8 – Martínez (substituted off) 76'; 10 – Mejía (substituted off) 68'; 11 – Auzmendi; 12 – Santos (substituted off) 71'; 14 – Argueta (substituted off) 46'; 17 – Decas; 26 – Meléndez (substituted off) 46'; Substitutes; 7 – Serrano (substituted on) 46'; 9 – Castillo (substituted on) 46'; 33 – Castellanos (substituted on) 68'; 15 – Maldonado (substituted on) 71'; 16 – Mejía (substituted on) 76'

14 April 2024 Week 15	Motagua	4–0	UPNFM	Tegucigalpa
17:15	Auzmendi 40'; Serrano 45'; Vega 59'; Vásquez 90+2'	Report		Stadium: Estadio Nacional; Referee: Melvin Matamoros Starting XI: 19 – Rougier; 3 – Meléndez; 4 – Vega; 6 – Zapata; 7 – Serrano (substituted off) 80'; 8 – Martínez (substituted off) 62'; 9 – Castillo (substituted off) 74'; 11 – Auzmendi (substituted off) 80'; 12 – Santos; 14 – Argueta; 33 – Castellanos (substituted off) 74'; Substitutes; 21 – Gómez (substituted on) 62'; 15 – Maldonado (substituted on) 74'; 29 – Auzmendi (substituted on) 74'; 26 – Meléndez (substituted on) 80'; 38 – Vásquez (substituted on) 80'
Note: Youngster Mathías Vásquez made his professional debut with the club wearing jersey #38 and scored his first goal. He is also the son of current coach Diego Vásquez. Panamanian Jorge Serrano also scored his first goal with the club.

21 April 2024 Week 16	Olimpia	2–2	Motagua	Tegucigalpa
17:00	Chirinos 46'; Bengtson 90+7'	Report	40' Castillo; 89' Vega	Stadium: Estadio Nacional; Referee: Saíd Martínez Starting XI: 19 – Rougier; 3 – Meléndez; 4 – Vega; 6 – Zapata; 7 – Serrano (substituted off) 76'; 8 – Martínez (substituted off) 66'; 9 – Castillo; 11 – Auzmendi (substituted off) 76'; 12 – Santos; 14 – Argueta (substituted off) 71'; 33 – Castellanos (substituted off) 71'; Substitutes; 26 – Meléndez (substituted on) 66'; 15 – Maldonado (substituted on) 71'; 2 – Álvarez (substituted on) 71'; 21 – Gómez (substituted on) 76'; 10 – Mejía (substituted on) 76'

25 April 2024 Week 17	Motagua	3–0	Real Sociedad	Tegucigalpa
17:15	Auzmendi 65' 68' 76'	Report		Stadium: Estadio Nacional; Referee: Jefferson Escobar Starting XI: 19 – Rougier; 2 – Álvarez; 4 – Vega; 6 – Zapata (substituted off) 67'; 7 – Serrano (substituted off) 76'; 8 – Martínez (substituted off) 62'; 11 – Auzmendi; 14 – Argueta (substituted off) 76'; 27 – Meléndez; 29 – Auzmendi (substituted off) 62'; 33 – Castellanos; Substitutes; 21 – Gómez (substituted on) 62'; 10 – Mejía (substituted on) 62'; 17 – Decas (substituted on) 67'; 26 – Meléndez (substituted on) 76'; 32 – Núñez (substituted on) 76'
Note: Agustín Auzmendi scored his second league hat-trick.

28 April 2024 Week 18	Vida	1–2	Motagua	La Ceiba
15:30	Canales 47' (pen.)	Report	24' Auzmendi; 73' Castillo	Stadium: Estadio Nilmo Edwards; Referee: Héctor Rodríguez Starting XI: 19 – Rougier; 4 – Vega; 7 – Serrano; 8 – Martínez (substituted off) 67'; 9 – Castillo (substituted off) 76'; 11 – Auzmendi; 12 – Santos; 14 – Argueta (substituted off) 67'; 17 – Decas (substituted off) 67'; 27 – Meléndez; 33 – Castellanos (substituted off) 75'; Substitutes; 21 – Gómez (substituted on) 67'; 6 – Zapata (substituted on) 67'; 10 – Mejía (substituted on) 67'; 15 – Maldonado (substituted on) 75'; 26 – Meléndez (substituted on) 76'
Note: F.C. Motagua finished the regular season in second place and qualified directly to the semifinal stage. Midfielder Raúl Santos reached 200 league games with the club.

8 May 2024 Semifinals	Olimpia	3–3	Motagua	Tegucigalpa
20:06	García 15'; Arboleda 27'; Rodríguez 90'	Report	68' Auzmendi; 75' Vega; 82' Álvarez	Stadium: Estadio Nacional; Referee: Selvin Brown Starting XI: 19 – Rougier; 3 – Meléndez (substituted off) 46'; 4 – Vega; 6 – Zapata (substituted off) 74'; 7 – Serrano (substituted off) 61'; 8 – Martínez (substituted off) 61'; 9 – Castillo; 10 – Mejía; 12 – Santos; 14 – Argueta (substituted off) 61'; 27 – Meléndez; Substitutes; 29 – Auzmendi (substituted on) 46'; 16 – Mejía (substituted on) 61'; 2 – Álvarez (substituted on) 61'; 21 – Gómez (substituted on) 61'; 17 – Decas (substituted on) 74'
Note: Both Rodrigo Auzmendi and Kevin Álvarez scored their first ever goals for F.C. Motagua.

11 May 2024 Semifinals	Motagua	3–4	Olimpia	Tegucigalpa
19:00	Gómez 11'; Castillo 21' (pen.); Meléndez 65'	Report	6' Arboleda; 51' Bengtson; 86' Najar; 89' (o.g.) Meléndez	Stadium: Estadio Nacional; Referee: Nelson Salgado Starting XI: 19 – Rougier; 3 – Meléndez; 4 – Vega; 7 – Serrano (substituted off) 79'; 8 – Martínez (substituted off) 61'; 9 – Castillo; 12 – Santos; 17 – Decas; 21 – Gómez (substituted off) 79'; 26 – Meléndez (substituted off) 67'; 27 – Meléndez (substituted off) 79'; Substitutes; 16 – Mejía (substituted on) 61'; 23 – Delgado (substituted on) 67'; 14 – Argueta (substituted on) 79'; 15 – Maldonado (substituted on) 79'; 2 – Álvarez (substituted on) 79'
Note: After a 6–7 aggregated score, F.C. Motagua failed to qualify to the Clausura's final. Argentinian Rodrigo Gómez scored his first ever goal for the club.

=== CONCACAF Central American Cup ===
2 August 2023 Group D	Verdes (Belize)	0–5	(Honduras) Motagua	Belmopan, Belize
16:00		Report	44' (pen.) 47' 56' Auzmendi; 78' López; 85' Mejía	Stadium: FFB Stadium; Referee: Josué Ugalde (CRC) Starting XI: 19 – Rougier; 2 – Álvarez; 5 – Pereira; 6 – Zapata (substituted off) 62'; 7 – López; 10 – Mejía; 11 – Auzmendi (substituted off) 73'; 12 – Santos; 14 – Argueta (substituted off) 82'; 15 – Maldonado; 21 – Escalante (substituted off) 46'; Substitutes; 8 – Martínez (substituted on) 46'; 33 – Galindo (substituted on) 62'; 18 – Campana (substituted on) 73'; 16 – Mejía (substituted on) 82'
Note: This was the first ever encounter between these two sides. The club obtained their largest international away victory and their first one overall since 1993. Iván López scored his first international goal. Agustín Auzmendi also scored his first three official goals for the club and became the first ever player to score an international hat-trick for F.C. Motagua. Riky Zapata, Yeison Mejía, Agustín Auzmendi, Carlos Argueta, Edwin Maldonado, José Escalante and Albert Galindo made their international debuts for the club.

9 August 2023 Group D	Motagua (Honduras)	2–0	(Panama) Sporting San Miguelito	Tegucigalpa, Honduras
20:00	Mejía 21' 60'	Report		Stadium: Estadio Nacional; Referee: Julio Luna (GUA) Starting XI: 19 – Rougier; 2 – Álvarez; 5 – Pereira; 6 – Zapata; 7 – López (substituted off) 86'; 8 – Martínez (substituted off) 66'; 10 – Mejía; 11 – Auzmendi (substituted off) 83'; 12 – Santos; 14 – Argueta (substituted off) 46'; 23 – Delgado; Substitutes; 16 – Mejía (substituted on) 46'; 26 – Meléndez (substituted on) 66'; 27 – Róchez (substituted on) 83'; 15 – Maldonado (substituted on) 86'
Note: This was the first ever encounter between these two sides. Midfielder Yeison Mejía scored his first two official goals for F.C. Motagua. Midfielder Denis Meléndez made his official debut for the club. Forward Jairo Róchez made his international debut with the club.

17 August 2023 Group D	Motagua (Honduras)	1–0	(Honduras) Olancho	Tegucigalpa, Honduras
20:00	Mejía 54'	Report		Stadium: Estadio Nacional; Referee: Randy Solano (DOM) Starting XI: 19 – Rougier; 2 – Álvarez; 5 – Pereira (substituted off) 75'; 6 – Zapata; 7 – López (substituted off) 79'; 10 – Mejía (substituted off) 89'; 11 – Auzmendi (substituted off) 75'; 12 – Santos; 16 – Mejía; 23 – Delgado; 26 – Meléndez (substituted off) 89'; Substitutes; 27 – Róchez (substituted on) 75'; 4 – Vega (substituted on) 75'; 14 – Argueta (substituted on) 79'; 15 – Maldonado (substituted on) 89'; 8 – Martínez (substituted on) 89'
Note: This was the first ever encounter between these two Honduran sides in international contention. Midfielder Luis Vega made his international debut for the club.

31 August 2023 Group D	Alajuelense (Costa Rica)	5–1	(Honduras) Motagua	Alajuela, Costa Rica
20:00	Navarro 5' 29'; Rodríguez 37'; Barrantes 64'; Venegas 90+2'	Report	15' Auzmendi	Stadium: Estadio Alejandro Morera Soto; Referee: Iván Cisneros (SLV) Starting XI: 1 – Facussé; 2 – Álvarez (substituted off) 23'; 3 – Meléndez; 4 – Vega; 7 – López (substituted off) 71'; 10 – Mejía; 11 – Auzmendi; 12 – Santos (substituted off) 81'; 21 – Escalante (substituted off) 81'; 23 – Delgado; 26 – Meléndez (substituted off) 71'; Substitutes; 5 – Pereira (substituted on) 23'; 8 – Martínez (substituted on) 71'; 27 – Róchez (substituted on) 71'; 17 – Decas (substituted on) 81'; 14 – Argueta (substituted on) 81'
Note: With 9 points obtained, F.C. Motagua qualified second in their group to the quarter-finals. Goalkeeper Enrique Facussé made his international debut with the club.

26 September 2023 Quarterfinals	Motagua (Honduras)	1–1	(Panama) Independiente	Tegucigalpa, Honduras
20:00	Auzmendi 35'	Report	80' Hurtado	Stadium: Estadio Nacional; Referee: David Gómez (CRC) Starting XI: 19 – Rougier; 3 – Meléndez; 4 – Vega (substituted off) 73'; 8 – Martínez (substituted off) 73'; 10 – Mejía (substituted off) 78'; 11 – Auzmendi; 12 – Santos; 14 – Argueta; 18 – Campana (substituted off) 73'; 23 – Delgado; 26 – Meléndez (substituted off) 66'; Substitutes; 15 – Maldonado (substituted on) 66'; 24 – García (substituted on) 73'; 7 – López (substituted on) 73'; 17 – Decas (substituted on) 73'; 16 – Mejía (substituted on) 78'
Note: This was the first ever encounter between these two teams. Antony García appeared in an international game for the first time.

3 October 2023 Quarterfinals	Independiente (Panama)	2–0	(Honduras) Motagua	Panama City, Panama
21:00 EST	Small 31' 45'	Report		Stadium: Estadio Rommel Fernández; Referee: Bryan López (GUA) Starting XI: 19 – Rougier; 3 – Meléndez; 4 – Vega; 10 – Mejía (substituted off) 76'; 11 – Auzmendi; 12 – Santos; 14 – Argueta (substituted off) 46'; 17 – Decas (substituted off) 46'; 18 – Campana; 23 – Delgado; 26 – Meléndez (substituted off) 46'; Substitutes; 7 – López (substituted on) 46'; 6 – Zapata (substituted on) 46'; 8 – Martínez (substituted on) 46'; 24 – García (substituted on) 76'
Note: With a 1–3 aggregated scored, F.C. Motagua failed to advance to the semifinals and was forced to play the play-in stage.

25 October 2023 Play-in	Motagua (Honduras)	2–2	(Costa Rica) Saprissa	Tegucigalpa, Honduras
18:00	Auzmendi 72' 89'	Report	42' Chirinos; 83' Madrigal	Stadium: Estadio Nacional; Referee: Daniel Quintero (MEX) Starting XI: 19 – Rougier; 5 – Pereira; 6 – Zapata; 8 – Martínez; 10 – Mejía (substituted off) 73'; 11 – Auzmendi; 12 – Santos; 14 – Argueta; 15 – Maldonado (substituted off) 54'; 18 – Campana; 23 – Delgado; Substitutes; 29 – Hernández (substituted on) 54'; 16 – Mejía (substituted on) 73'
Note: Forward Andy Hernández made his international debut.

1 November 2023 Play-in	Saprissa (Costa Rica)	4–0	(Honduras) Motagua	San José, Costa Rica
18:00	Rodríguez 2'; Waston 9'; Sinclair 45+1'; Paradela 85'	Report		Stadium: Estadio Ricardo Saprissa Aymá; Referee: Iván Barton (SLV) Starting XI: 19 – Rougier; 3 – Meléndez; 6 – Zapata (substituted off) 46'; 8 – Martínez (substituted off) 46'; 10 – Mejía (substituted off) 86'; 11 – Auzmendi; 12 – Santos; 14 – Argueta (substituted off) 58'; 15 – Maldonado; 18 – Campana (substituted off) 86'; 23 – Delgado; Substitutes; 2 – Álvarez (substituted on) 46'; 17 – Decas (substituted on) 46'; 16 – Mejía (substituted on) 58'; 29 – Hernández (substituted on) 86'; 50 – Barrios (substituted on) 86'

== Statistics ==
As of 11 May 2024

Competition	GP	GW	GD	GL	GF	GA	GD	CS	SG	Per
Liga Nacional	44	18	17	9	76	52	+24	18	8	53.79%
CONCACAF Central American Cup	8	3	2	3	12	14	–2	3	2	45.83%
Others	4	1	1	2	5	6	–1	0	1	33.33%
Totals	56	22	20	14	93	72	+21	21	11	51.19%
