= 2016–17 Premier League of Belize =

Premier League of Belize
- Season: 2016–17
- Dates: 20 August 2016 – 13 May 2017
- Champions: Opening and Closing: Belmopan Bandits
- CONCACAF League: Belmopan Bandits
- Matches: 140
- Goals: 478 (3.41 per match)
- Top goalscorer: Opening: Jairo Rochez (14); Closing: Daniel Jimenez; Jairo Rochez (10)
- Biggest home win: Belmopan Bandits 11-0 Wagiya (1 March 2017)
- Biggest away win: Orange Walk 0–9 Police United (26 November 2016)
- Highest scoring: Belmopan Bandits 9-2 Orange Walk (19 November 2016); Belmopan Bandits 11-0 Wagiya (1 March 2017)
- Longest winning run: Belmopan Bandits (6)
- Longest unbeaten run: Belmopan Bandits (19)
- Longest winless run: Wagiya (14)
- Longest losing run: Orange Walk (10)

The 2016–17 Premier League of Belize was the sixth season of the highest competitive football league in Belize, after it was founded in 2011. There were two seasons which were spread over two years. The opening was played towards the end of 2016 and the closing was played at the beginning of 2017.

== Team information ==
Team	City	Stadium
Belize Defence Force	Belize City	MCC Grounds
Belmopan Bandits	Belmopan	Isidoro Beaton Stadium
FC Belize	Belize City	MCC Grounds
Freedom Fighters	Punta Gorda	Victor Sanchez Union Field
Orange Walk	Orange Walk	People's Stadium
Placencia Assassins	Independence	Michael Ashcroft Stadium
Police United	San Ignacio	Norman Broaster Stadium
Verdes	San Ignacio	Norman Broaster Stadium
Wagiya	Dangriga	Carl Ramos Stadium

== Opening season ==
From the 2015–16 Premier League of Belize season, all 6 teams continued to play in the opening season of 2016–17. FC Belize and Freedom Fighters returned to the league, as well as a newly formed team, Orange Walk, making 9 teams in total.

There would be one league consisting of the 9 teams, who will play each other twice, with the top 4 teams advancing to the end of season playoffs. The opening season commenced on 20 August 2016.

=== League table ===
Pos	Team	Pld	W	D	L	GF	GA	GD	Pts	Qualification
1	Belmopan Bandits (C)	16	12	4	0	45	11	+34	40	Qualification to the Playoffs
2	Belize Defence Force	16	8	7	1	29	13	+16	31	Qualification to the Playoffs
3	Police United	16	8	4	4	39	21	+18	28	Qualification to the Playoffs
4	FC Belize	16	8	4	4	30	22	+8	28	Qualification to the Playoffs
5	Placencia Assassins	16	7	4	5	34	21	+13	25	
6	Verdes	16	7	3	6	27	24	+3	24	
7	Wagiya	16	3	2	11	26	42	−16	11	
8	Freedom Fighters	16	3	2	11	24	44	−20	11	
9	Orange Walk	16	1	0	15	20	76	−56	3	

Source: Soccerway
Rules for classification: 1) points; 2) goal difference; 3) number of goals scored.
(C) Champions

=== Results ===
Home \ Away	BDF	BEL	FCB	FRE	ORA	PLA	POL	VER	WAG
Belize Defence Force		1–1	1–1	2–2	3–1	2–1	1–1	3–0	1–0
Belmopan Bandits	0–0		0–0	4–1	9–2	4–0	2–1	2–0	4–1
FC Belize	0–2	0–3		2–0	4–2	1–2	2–1	1–1	4–2
Freedom Fighters	1–2	3–3	1–6		5–2	0–2	3–6	0–2	3–0
Orange Walk	1–5	0–2	3–4	1–3		0–7	0–9	0–6	4–3
Placencia Assassins	0–3	0–1	0–1	3–0	4–1		3–3	1–1	4–0
Police United	0–0	1–2	1–0	3–1	3–0	1–1		3–2	3–1
Verdes	2–1	1–4	1–2	3–1	3–1	1–1	2–1		2–1
Wagiya	2–2	0–4	2–2	3–0	6–2	2–5	1–2	2–0	

Updated to match(es) played on 4 December 2016. Source: Soccerway
Legend: Blue = home team win; Yellow = draw; Red = away team win.

=== Playoffs ===
Semi-Finals
1	Belmopan Bandits	1	1	2
4	FC Belize	1	0	1
2	Belize Defence Force (a)	1	2	3
3	Police United	3	0	3

Finals
1	Belmopan Bandits	0	4	4
2	Belize Defence Force	1	0	1

==== Semi-finals ====
Game One

11 December 2016	FC Belize	1 – 1	Belmopan Bandits	MCC Grounds, Belize City
16:00	Hector Martinez 34'		Jeromy James 75'

11 December 2016	Police United	3 – 1	Belize Defence Force	Norman Broaster Stadium, San Ignacio
16:00	Carlton Thomas 22'; Daniel Jimenez 38'; Byron Usher 49'		Shane Flores 90+1'

Game Two

17 December 2016	Belmopan Bandits	1 – 0 (2 – 1 agg.)	FC Belize	Isidoro Beaton Stadium, Belmopan
20:00	Jairo Rochez 22'

18 December 2016	Belize Defence Force	2 – 0 (3 (a) – 3 agg.)	Police United	MCC Grounds, Belize City
16:00	Vallan Symms 51' (pen.); Kyle Budna 87'

==== Finals ====
Game One

24 December 2016	Belize Defence Force	1 – 0	Belmopan Bandits	MCC Grounds, Belize City
16:00	Trimayne Harris 64'

Game Two

31 December 2016	Belmopan Bandits	4 – 0 (4 – 1 agg.)	Belize Defence Force	Isidoro Beaton Stadium, Belmopan
19:30	Elroy Smith 3' (pen.); Aloisio Teixeira 12', 34'; Jairo Rochez 27'			Referee: Irfan Basdmir

2016–17 Opening Season champions

6th title

=== Season statistics ===
==== Top scorers ====
Rank	Player	Team	Goals^{*}
1	(Honduras) Jairo Rochez	Belmopan Bandits	14
2	(Belize) Dellon Torres	Placencia Assassins	12
3	(Belize) Jarret Davis	Verdes	11
3	(Brazil) Aloisio Teixeira	Belmopan Bandits	11
5	(Belize) Jaren Lambey	Freedom Fighters	10
6	(Mexico) Hector Martinez	FC Belize	9
6	(Belize) Carlton Thomas	Police United	9
8	(Belize) Ashton Torres	Placencia Assassins	8
9	(Belize) Russell Cassanova	FC Belize	7
9	(Brazil) Joao Silva	Orange Walk	7
9	(Belize) Vallan Symms	Belize Defence Force	7
12	(Belize) Jeromy James	Belmopan Bandits	6
12	(Belize) Harrison Roches	Police United	6

^{*} Includes playoff goals.

==== Hat-tricks ====
Player	For	Against	Result	Date
(Belize) Dellon Torres^{4}	Placencia Assassins	Orange Walk	7–0 (A)	28 August 2016
(Belize) Russell Cassanova	FC Belize	Orange Walk	4–2 (H)	28 September 2016
(Belize) Carlton Thomas	Police United	Freedom Fighters	6–3 (A)	30 October 2016
(Honduras) Jairo Rochez^{4}	Belmopan Bandits	Orange Walk	9–2 (H)	19 November 2016
(Mexico) Hector Martinez	FC Belize	Freedom Fighters	6–1 (A)	4 December 2016

^{4} Player scored 4 goals

=== Awards ===
In the post-game ceremonies of the final game of the season, the individual awards were announced.

Award	Recipient	Team
Golden Boot	(Honduras) Jairo Rochez	Belmopan Bandits
MVP (Regular Season)	(Belize) Shane Orio	Belmopan Bandits
MVP (Playoff)	(Belize) Jordy Polanco	Belmopan Bandits
Best Young Player	(Belize) Jaren Lambey	Freedom Fighters
Best Midfielder	(Belize) Jordy Polanco	Belmopan Bandits
Best Defender	(Belize) Elroy Smith	Belmopan Bandits
Golden Glove	(Belize) Shane Orio	Belmopan Bandits
Best Coach	(Belize) Kent Gabourel	Belmopan Bandits
Best Manager	(Belize) Kenneth Budna	Belmopan Bandits

== Closing season ==
8 of the 9 teams that participated in the opening season will participate in the closing season, with Orange Walk not competing.

The format will be the same as the opening season with one league consisting of the 8 teams, who will play each other twice, with the top 4 teams advancing to the end of season playoffs. The closing season commenced on 28 January 2017.

=== League table ===
Pos	Team	Pld	W	D	L	GF	GA	GD	Pts	Qualification
1	Belmopan Bandits (C)	14	11	3	0	39	8	+31	36	Qualification to the Playoffs
2	Police United	14	6	7	1	27	15	+12	25	Qualification to the Playoffs
3	Verdes	14	7	4	3	21	16	+5	25	Qualification to the Playoffs
4	Belize Defence Force	14	6	5	3	26	21	+5	23	Qualification to the Playoffs
5	FC Belize	14	4	4	6	18	21	−3	16	
6	Placencia Assassins	14	4	1	9	17	22	−5	13	
7	Freedom Fighters	14	3	2	9	17	32	−15	11	
8	Wagiya	14	1	2	11	17	47	−30	5	

Source: Soccerway
Rules for classification: 1) points; 2) goal difference; 3) number of goals scored.
(C) Champions

=== Results ===
Home \ Away	BDF	BEL	FCB	FRE	PLA	POL	VER	WAG
Belize Defence Force		0–4	2–1	3–1	2–0	2–2	0–3	6–0
Belmopan Bandits	2–1		1–0	4–1	3–1	0–0	2–0	11–0
FC Belize	2–2	1–1		1–2	3–2	1–0	3–0	2–1
Freedom Fighters	1–2	0–3	1–1		2–1	0–3	0–1	4–2
Placencia Assassins	1–2	1–2	2–0	2–1		2–2	0–1	2–0
Police United	1–1	1–1	3–2	4–1	2–0		1–1	2–1
Verdes	1–1	0–2	3–0	1–1	2–1	2–2		5–3
Wagiya	2–2	2–3	1–1	4–2	0–2	1–4	0–1	

Updated to match(es) played on 16 April 2017. Source: Soccerway
Legend: Blue = home team win; Yellow = draw; Red = away team win.

=== Playoffs ===
Semi-Finals
1	Belmopan Bandits	1	1	2
4	Belize Defence Force	0	1	1
2	Police United	0	2	2 (7)
3	Verdes (p)	2	0	2 (8)

Finals
1	Belmopan Bandits	0	1	1
3	Verdes	0	0	0

==== Semi-finals ====
Game One

23 April 2017	Belize Defence Force	0 – 1	Belmopan Bandits	MCC Grounds, Belize City
16:00			Jairo Rochez 89'

23 April 2017	Verdes	2 – 0	Police United	Norman Broaster Stadium, San Ignacio
16:00	Nahjib Guerra 38'; Jarret Davis 48'

Game Two

29 April 2017	Belmopan Bandits	1 – 1 (2 – 1 agg.)	Belize Defence Force	Isidoro Beaton Stadium, Belmopan
19:30	Jairo Rochez 10'		Brian Martinez 71'

30 April 2017	Police United	2 – 0 (a.e.t.) (2 – 2 agg.) (7 – 8 p)	Verdes	Isidoro Beaton Stadium, Belmopan
19:30	Carlton Thomas 79'; Darren Myers 87'
	Penalties
	Trevor Lennan (penalty scored); Darren Myers (penalty scored); Harrison Roches (penalty scored); Lennox Castillo (penalty scored); Daniel Jimenez (penalty scored); Devon Makin (penalty scored); Carlton Thomas (penalty scored); Byron Usher (penalty missed)		(penalty scored) Gilroy Thurton; (penalty scored) Jahron Myvette; (penalty scored) Jarret Davis; (penalty scored) Cristobal Gilharry; (penalty scored) Everal Trapp; (penalty scored) Ryan Gill; (penalty scored) Orlando Jimenez; (penalty scored) Victor Mejia

==== Finals ====
Game One

7 May 2017	Verdes	0 – 0	Belmopan Bandits	Norman Broaster Stadium, San Ignacio
16:00

Game Two

13 May 2017	Belmopan Bandits	1 – 0 (1 – 0 agg.)	Verdes	Isidoro Beaton Stadium, Belmopan
19:30	Ian Gaynair (x1)

2016–17 Closing Season champions

7th title

=== Season statistics ===
==== Top scorers ====
Rank	Player	Team	Goals^{*}
1	(Belize) Daniel Jimenez	Police United	10
1	(Honduras) Jairo Rochez	Belmopan Bandits	10
3	(Belize) Brian Martinez	Belize Defence Force	9
4	(Belize) Luis Torres	Placencia Assassins	8
5	(Brazil) Aloisio Teixeira	Belmopan Bandits	7
6	(Belize) Highking Roberts	Belmopan Bandits	6
7	(Belize) Jarret Davis	Verdes	5
7	(Belize) Shane Flores	Belize Defence Force	5
7	(Belize) Jaren Lambey	Freedom Fighters	5
7	(Mexico) Hector Martinez	FC Belize	5
11	(Belize) Jeromy James	Belmopan Bandits	4
11	(Belize) Alexander Peters	Freedom Fighters	4
11	(Belize) Elroy Smith	Belmopan Bandits	4
11	(Belize) Carlton Thomas	Police United	4
11	(Belize) Gilroy Thurton	Verdes	4

^{*} Includes playoff goals.

==== Hat-tricks ====
Player	For	Against	Result	Date
(Belize) Brian Martinez	Belize Defence Force	Wagiya	6–0 (H)	29 January 2017
(Belize) Highking Roberts^{4}	Belmopan Bandits	Wagiya	11–0 (H)	1 March 2017
(Brazil) Aloisio Teixeira	Belmopan Bandits	Freedom Fighters	4–1 (H)	8 April 2017

^{4} Player scored 4 goals

=== Awards ===
In the post-game ceremonies of the final game of the season, the individual awards were announced.

Award	Recipient	Team
Golden Boot (Regular Season)	(Belize) Daniel Jimenez	Police United
Golden Boot (Overall)	(Belize) Daniel Jimenez	Police United
Golden Boot (Overall)	(Honduras) Jairo Rochez	Belmopan Bandits
MVP (Regular Season)	(Belize) Daniel Jimenez	Police United
MVP (Playoff)	(Belize) Ian Gaynair	Belmopan Bandits
Best Young Player	(Belize) Rene Leslie	Placencia Assassins
Best Midfielder	(Belize) Denmark Casey Jr.	Belmopan Bandits
Best Defender	(Belize) Elroy Smith	Belmopan Bandits
Golden Glove	(Belize) Shane Orio	Belmopan Bandits
Best Coach	(Belize) Marvin Ottley	Verdes
Best Manager	(Belize) Lorin Frazer	Verdes
