= Rodrigo Auzmendi =

Argentine footballer (born 2001)

Personal information
- Date of birth: 2 January 2001 (age 25)
- Place of birth: Adolfo Gonzales Chaves, Argentina
- Height: 1.91 m (6 ft 3 in)
- Position: Forward

Team information
- Current team: San Lorenzo (on loan from Querétaro)
- Number: 29

Youth career
- Independencia
- Quilmes
- 2019–2021: Plaza Colonia
- 2019–2020: → Porto (loan)
- 2021–2022: Gimnasia La Plata

Senior career*
Years	Team	Apps	(Gls)
2022–2023	San Marcos de Arica	28	(5)
2024–2025	Motagua	40	(20)
2025–2026	Banfield	22	(4)
2026–	Querétaro	0	(0)
2026–	→ San Lorenzo (loan)	23	(7)
- * Club domestic league appearances and goals as of 18:09, 21 November 2026 (UTC)

Rodrigo Auzmendi (born 2 January 2001) is an Argentine footballer who plays as a forward for San Lorenzo, on loan from Liga MX club Querétaro.

== Career ==
Born in Adolfo Gonzales Chaves, Auzmendi played for hometown side CD Independencia and Quilmes before moving to Uruguay in February 2019, joining Plaza Colonia. On 2 August of that year, he was announced at Portuguese side FC Porto on loan, initially for their under-19 team.

Back from his loan in July 2020, Auzmendi signed for Gimnasia La Plata in January 2021, but only played for their reserve team. Ahead of the 2022 season, he agreed to a deal with San Marcos de Arica in the Segunda División Profesional de Chile, and helped the club to achieve promotion as champions.

On 30 January 2024, Auzmendi switched teams and countries again, after agreeing to a one-year contract with Motagua in Honduras. In the 2024–25 season, he scored a career-best 19 goals, also helping the club to lift the Apertura tournament.

On 3 June 2025, Auzmendi returned to his home country after being announced at Banfield; he signed an 18-month contract, after the club activated his release clause. On his club – and Liga Profesional – debut on 20 July, he scored and provided an assist in a 2–1 away win over Newell's Old Boys.

In March 2026, Auzmendi moved to San Lorenzo on loan from Liga MX side Querétaro; the Mexican side obtained his economic rights on a free transfer, in exchange of the settlement of Banfield's debt with Querétaro for the transfer of Martín Río, but as Querétaro had no foreign spots available, he was loaned to Ciclón until December.

== Personal life ==
Auzmendi's older brother Agustín is also a footballer and a forward. Both played together at Motagua.

== Career statistics ==
As of 25 May 2026

Club	Season	League			Cup		Continental		Other		Total	
Club	Season	Division	Apps	Goals	Apps	Goals	Apps	Goals	Apps	Goals	Apps	Goals
San Marcos de Arica	2025	Segunda División Profesional	16	4	—		—		—		16	4
San Marcos de Arica	2023	Primera B	12	1	3	5	—		—		15	6
San Marcos de Arica	Total		28	5	3	5	—		—		31	10
Motagua	2023–24	Liga Nacional	7	1	—		—		—		7	1
Motagua	2023–24	Liga Nacional	33	19	—		9 (Note: Seven appearances and two goals in CONCACAF Central American Cup, two appearances and two goals in CONCACAF Champions Cup)	4	—		42	23
Motagua	Total		40	20	—		9	4	—		49	24
Banfield	2025	Liga Profesional	15	4	—		—		—		15	4
Banfield	2026	Liga Profesional	7	0	0	0	—		—		7	0
Banfield	Total		22	4	0	0	—		—		22	4
San Lorenzo	2026	Liga Profesional	8	4	1	0	5 (Note: Appearance(s) in Copa Sudamericana)	2	—		14	6
Career total			98	33	4	5	14	6	0	0	116	44

== Honours ==
San Marcos de Arica

- Segunda División Profesional de Chile: 2022

Motagua

- Liga Nacional de Fútbol de Honduras: 2024 Apertura
