= Enrique Facussé =

Honduran footballer (born 1998)

Personal information
- Full name: Enrique Roberto Facussé Hasbun
- Date of birth: 30 December 1998 (age 27)
- Place of birth: Tegucigalpa, Honduras
- Height: 1.93 m (6 ft 4 in)
- Position: Goalkeeper

Team information
- Current team: Juticalpa
- Number: 23

College career
Years	Team	Apps	(Gls)
2017–2021	Kentucky Wildcats	62	(0)

Senior career*
Years	Team	Apps	(Gls)
2023–2025	Motagua	1	(0)
2024	→ Inter Palmira (loan)	7	(0)
2025	→ Juticalpa (loan)	2	(0)
2025	→ Westchester SC (loan)	9	(0)
2025–	Juticalpa	6	(0)

International career^{‡}
2023	Honduras U23	3	(0)
- * Club domestic league appearances and goals as of 25 May 2026 ‡ National team caps and goals as of 5 November 2023

Enrique Roberto Facussé Hasbun (born 30 December 1998) is a Honduran professional footballer who plays as goalkeeper for Liga Nacional club Juticalpa.

== Early career ==
Facussé played collegiate soccer as a goalkeeper for the Kentucky Wildcats. During his career, he led the nation in shutouts (14), while his .49 goals-against average ranked fourth nationally. Additionally, his .844 save percentage ranked 12th in Division I, and his .640 shutout percentage was the third-best in the country. Led by his performance, UK went 19–2–1, winning the Conference USA double and reaching the NCAA tournament Elite Eight. Ahead of the 2021 MLS SuperDraft, Facussé was selected 46th overall by Orlando City. He was invited to train with the team during their preseason trial, but was not signed to a contract.

== Club career ==
Following his graduation from the University of Kentucky, Facussé briefly trained with Las Palmas Atlético in May 2021.

On 22 August 2022, Facussé signed with Honduran top flight club Motagua. He made his professional debut in an eventful league match against Vida, that ended 3–3.

In January 2024 he joined Categoría Primera B club Internacional de Palmira on a year-long loan.

Facussé joined USL League One side Westchester SC on loan in August 2025.
