= Orange Walk FC =

Belizean football club

- Full name: Orange Walk Football Club
- Founded: 2016
- Ground: People's Stadium; Orange Walk Town, Belize
- League: Premier League of Belize
- 2016–17: oriente

Orange Walk Football Club is a Belizean football team, currently playing in the Premier League of Belize.

== History ==
The team founded on 21 June 2016. in Orange Walk Town, Orange Walk District. Their home stadium is People's Stadium.

The club played its first official league match in the 2016/17 season, Then he withdrew due to financial problems.
