= Lucas Campana =

Argentine footballer

Personal information
- Full name: Lucas Ariel Campana
- Date of birth: 9 March 1993 (age 33)
- Place of birth: Buenos Aires, Argentina
- Height: 1.80 m (5 ft 11 in)
- Position: Forward

Team information
- Current team: Cobán Imperial

Youth career
- Huracán

Senior career*
Years	Team	Apps	(Gls)
2015–2020	Huracán	6	(1)
2015–2016	→ La Serena (loan)	27	(11)
2016–2018	→ Temuco (loan)	45	(9)
2018–2019	→ Brown de Adrogué (loan)	13	(3)
2019	→ Estudiantes BA (loan)	11	(3)
2020–2021	San Martín SJ	23	(6)
2021	Sport Boys	16	(1)
2022	Marathón	16	(7)
2023	Motagua	0	(0)
2024-	Cobán Imperial	0	(0)
- * Club domestic league appearances and goals as of 16:53, 17 July 2022 (UTC)

Lucas Ariel Campana (born 9 March 1993) is an Argentine professional footballer who plays as a forward for Liga Nacional club Cobán Imperial.
