= Sebastián Cardozo =

Uruguayan footballer (born 1995)

Personal information
- Full name: Sebastián Cardozo Coitinho
- Date of birth: 9 September 1995 (age 31)
- Place of birth: Montevideo, Uruguay
- Height: 1.89 m (6 ft 2 in)
- Position: Centre back

Youth career
- Racing Club

Senior career*
Years	Team	Apps	(Gls)
2015–2019	Racing Club	8	(0)
2017	→ Villa Teresa (loan)	18	(2)
2018	→ Albion (loan)	10	(1)
2018	→ Inter Playa (loan)	–	(–)
2019	Glacis United	3	(0)
2020	Cerrito	7	(0)
2022–	La Luz	37	(1)
2023	→ Coquimbo Unido (loan)	0	(0)
2024	Progreso	16	(3)
2024–2025	Motagua	54	(4)
- * Club domestic league appearances and goals as of 4 January 2026

Sebastián Cardozo Coitinho (born 9 September 1995) is an Uruguayan professional footballer who most recently played as a centre-back for Honduran club Motagua.

== Career ==
On second half 2023, he joined Chilean Primera División club Coquimbo Unido on loan from La Luz.
