= Yeison Mejía =

Honduran footballer (born 1998)

Personal information
- Full name: Yeison Fernando Mejía Zelaya
- Date of birth: January 18, 1998 (age 28)
- Place of birth: Iriona, Honduras
- Height: 1.79 m (5 ft 10 in)
- Position: Winger

Team information
- Current team: Marathón

Youth career
- Olimpia

Senior career*
Years	Team	Apps	(Gls)
2018–2019	Olimpia	0	(0)
2018–2019	→ Parrillas One (loan)	0	(0)
2019	Sansare	0	(0)
2020	Real Sociedad	21	(3)
2021–2023	Real España	56	(3)
2023	→ Sporting Kansas City II (loan)	4	(0)
2023–2025	Motagua	72	(10)
2025–2026	Olancho FC	0	(0)
2026–	Marathón	0	(0)

International career^{‡}
2023–	Honduras	1	(0)
- * Club domestic league appearances and goals as of 19 September 2023 ‡ National team caps and goals as of 07:12, 19 September 2023 (UTC)

Yeison Fernando Mejía Zelaya (born 18 January 1998) is a Honduran professional footballer who plays as a winger for Marathón and the Honduras national team.

== Career ==
For the 2019 season, Mejía signed for Guatemalan second division side Sansare after playing for the youth academy of Olimpia, Honduras' most successful club.

In 2020, he signed for Real España in the Honduran top flight.
