= Agustín Auzmendi =

Argentine footballer

Personal information
- Date of birth: 1 February 1997 (age 29)
- Place of birth: Adolfo Gonzales Chaves, Argentina
- Height: 1.80 m (5 ft 11 in)
- Position: Forward

Team information
- Current team: Gimnasia LP (on loan from Godoy Cruz)
- Number: 29

Youth career
- 2013–2017: Acassuso

Senior career*
Years	Team	Apps	(Gls)
2017–2021	Acassuso	80	(17)
2022	Jaguares de Córdoba	4	(0)
2022–2023	Olancho	35	(23)
2023–2025	Motagua	64	(42)
2025–	Godoy Cruz	23	(5)
2026–	→ Gimnasia LP (loan)	18	(2)
- * Club domestic league appearances and goals as of 17:26, 9 July 2026 (UTC)

Agustín Auzmendi (born 1 February 1997) is an Argentine professional footballer who plays as a forward for Gimnasia LP, on loan from Godoy Cruz.

== Career ==
Auzmendi began his career with Acassuso; joining in 2013. He was promoted into their first-team squad for the back end of the 2016–17 Primera B Metropolitana campaign, making his professional debut on 10 May 2017 versus Fénix. He featured three times off the bench in total, with the third match including Auzmendi's first senior goal in a 4–1 victory over Tristán Suárez on 17 June. He appeared just once in 2017–18, prior to becoming a regular member of the team in 2018–19 as he played in twenty-one of their opening thirty-one fixtures; ten of which as a starter. After his move to Olancho FC, he was a huge addition to the newly promoted club, in which he helped them reach the final of the 2023 Clausura. He would manage to score in both legs of the final but would lose to the eventual champions C.D. Olimpia for their record 36th title. After a successful season at Olancho FC, he would earn a move to F.C. Motagua.

On 31 January 2025, Auzmendi returned to Argentina to join Primera División club Godoy Cruz. He made his debut in Godoy Cruz on 17 February 2025 in 2–0 victory away at Vélez Sarsfield, coming on as a substitute for Luca Martínez.

== Career statistics ==
As of 9 April 2019.

Appearances and goals by club, season and competition
Club	Season	League			Cup		Continental		Other		Total	
Club	Season	Division	Apps	Goals	Apps	Goals	Apps	Goals	Apps	Goals	Apps	Goals
Acassuso	2016–17	Primera B Metropolitana	3	1	0	0	—		0	0	3	1
Acassuso	2017–18	Primera B Metropolitana	1	0	0	0	—		0	0	1	0
Acassuso	2018–19	Primera B Metropolitana	21	4	0	0	—		0	0	21	4
Career total			25	5	0	0	—		0	0	25	5

== Honours ==
F.C. Motagua

- Honduran Liga Nacional: 2024 Apertura
