= Jairo Róchez =

Honduran footballer (born 1991)

Jairo Rochez
Personal information
- Full name: Jairo Rochez Crisanto
- Date of birth: 5 April 1991 (age 35)
- Place of birth: Roatán, Honduras
- Height: 1.76 m (5 ft 9 in)
- Position: Striker

Team information
- Current team: Juticalpa FC
- Number: 27

Senior career*
| Years | Team | Apps | (Gls) |
- Las Mercedes
| –2013 | C.D. Victoria | | |
| 2013–2014 | Social Sol | | |
| 2014–2015 | Lepaera F.C. | | |
| 2015–2016 | Deportes Savio | | |
| 2016 | Universidad O&M FC | | |
| 2016–2017 | Belmopan Bandits | 10 | (14) |
| 2017–2023 | Lobos UPNFM | 69 | (14) |
| 2023– | Motagua | 0 | (0) |
- * Club domestic league appearances and goals

Jairo Rochez Crisanto (born 5 April 1991) is a Honduran professional footballer who presently plays as a striker for Juticalpa FC of the Liga Nacional de Fútbol Profesional de Honduras.

== Early life ==
Born in Roatan, Rochez moved to the town of Plaplaya at the age of 5 with his family.

== Career ==
=== Colombian trial ===
Trained with Colombian club Deportivo Pereira in 2014.

=== Belize ===
Joining Belmopan Bandits of the Belize Premier League in 2016, the Honduran striker participated in two training sessions with the squad before putting in what was seen as an exemplary performance on his debut by scoring a brace. That season, he ended up with the top scorer award, recording 14 goals in 10 outings.
