= 2025–26 F.C. Motagua season =

Motagua
2025–26 season
- Chairman: Eduardo Atala
- Managers: Diego Vásquez; Javier López
- Stadium: Estadio Nacional
- Apertura: Group stage
- Clausura: Winners
- CONCACAF Central American Cup: Play-in loss
- Top goalscorer: League: Oliveira (14); All: Oliveira (14)
| Home colours | Away colours | Third colours |
- All statistics correct as of 24 May 2026.

The 2025–26 season will be F.C. Motagua's 79th season in existence and the club's 60th consecutive season in the top fight of Honduran football. In addition to the domestic league, the club will also compete in the 2025 CONCACAF Central American Cup.

== Overview ==
The club will try to improve their 2024–25 season where they won one out of four tournaments they competed on. On 11 August, DT Diego Vásquez was sacked due to poor results and was replaced by Javier López. On 28 October, the club lost 1–4 on aggregate to C.S. Cartaginés in the 2025 CONCACAF Central American Cup play-in stage, thus missing the chance to qualify to the 2026 CONCACAF Champions Cup. On 17 December, after a 0–2 defeat in the group stage against C.D. Olimpia, the club was officially eliminated from the Apertura tournament. On 24 May, the club obtained its 20th league title after defeating C.D. Marathón in the Clausura finals.

== Kits ==
The 2025–26 home, away and third kits were published on 11 July.

| Manufacturer | | Main sponsor | |
|---|---|---|---|
| Joma | | Pepsi | |
| Home | Away | Alternative | Goalkeeper |

== Players ==
=== Transfers in ===
| Player | Contract date | Moving from |
|---|---|---|
| (Honduras) Luís Ortíz | 12 May 2025 | (Honduras) Marathón |
| (Honduras) Luís Crisanto | 24 May 2025 | (Honduras) Juticalpa |
| (Colombia) Wilmar Jordán | 12 June 2025 | (India) Chennaiyin |
| (Honduras) Luís Meléndez | 12 June 2025 | (Honduras) Juticalpa |
| (Honduras) Yoel Castillo | 14 June 2025 | (Honduras) Parrillas One |
| (Uruguay) Maicol Cabrera | 6 July 2025 | (India) Rajasthan United |
| (Brazil) John Oliveira | 21 August 2025 | (Guatemala) Achuapa |
| (Honduras) Pablo Cacho | 3 January 2026 | (Honduras) Victoria |
| (Honduras) José Reyes | 3 January 2026 | (Costa Rica) Sporting |
| (Brazil) Romário da Silva | 8 January 2026 | (Guatemala) Xelajú |
| (Uruguay) Rodrigo De Olivera | 29 January 2026 | (Honduras) Olancho |

=== Transfers out ===
| Player | Released date | Moving to |
|---|---|---|
| (Argentina) Jonathan Rougier | 22 May 2025 | (Argentina) Racing de Córdoba |
| (Honduras) Walter Martínez | 24 May 2025 | (Honduras) Victoria |
| (Argentina) Rodrigo Auzmendi | 1 June 2025 | (Argentina) Banfield |
| (Argentina) Diego Ledesma | 3 June 2025 | (Argentina) Central Norte |
| (Honduras) Yeison Mejía | 9 June 2025 | (Honduras) Olancho |
| (Honduras) Héctor Castellanos | 9 June 2025 | (Honduras) Génesis PN |
| (Honduras) Edwin Maldonado | 17 June 2025 | (Honduras) Génesis PN |
| (Honduras) Alfred Jervis | 23 June 2025 | (Honduras) Choloma |
| (Colombia) Wilmar Jordán | 20 August 2025 | (Malaysia) Immigration |
| (Uruguay) Maicol Cabrera | 3 January 2026 | TBD |
| (Uruguay) Sebastián Cardozo | 4 January 2026 | TBD |
| (Honduras) Jonathan Núñez | 5 January 2026 | (Honduras) UPNFM (loaned) |
| (Honduras) Yoel Castillo | 5 January 2026 | (Honduras) Platense (loaned) |
| (Honduras) Carlos Argueta | 10 January 2026 | TBD |
| (Honduras) Mathías Vásquez | 14 January 2026 | (United States) Cincinnati 2 (loaned) |
| (Honduras) Edwin Munguía | 17 January 2026 | (Honduras) Estrella Roja (loaned) |

=== Squad ===
As of 24 May 2026

- Only league matches into account

| No. | Pos. | Player name | Date of birth and age | Games played | | | Goals scored | | |
| | | | | < 24/25 | 25/26 | Total | < 24/25 | 25/26 | Total |
|---|---|---|---|---|---|---|---|---|---|
| 1 | GK | (Honduras) Daniel Paguada | 10 October 2005 (aged 19) | 0 | 0 | 0 | 0 | 0 | 0 |
| 2 | DF | (Uruguay) Sebastián Cardozo | 9 September 1995 (aged 29) | 34 | 20 | 54 | 2 | 2 | 4 |
| 2 | DF | (Honduras) Pablo Cacho | 29 September 2001 (aged 23) | 0 | 3 | 3 | 0 | 0 | 0 |
| 3 | DF | (Honduras) Carlos Meléndez | 8 December 1997 (aged 27) | 86 | 0 | 86 | 6 | 0 | 6 |
| 4 | DF | (Honduras) Luis Vega | 28 February 2002 (aged 23) | 56 | 28 | 84 | 7 | 0 | 7 |
| 5 | MF | (Honduras) Óscar Padilla | 7 November 1992 (aged 32) | 15 | 32 | 47 | 1 | 3 | 4 |
| 6 | DF | (Honduras) Riky Zapata | 23 November 1997 (aged 27) | 54 | 16 | 70 | 1 | 0 | 1 |
| 7 | MF | (Panama) Jorge Serrano | 19 January 1998 (aged 27) | 49 | 47 | 96 | 5 | 2 | 7 |
| 8 | MF | (Honduras) Denis Meléndez | 22 July 1995 (aged 29) | 50 | 44 | 94 | 3 | 4 | 7 |
| 9 | FW | (Colombia) Wilmar Jordán | 17 October 1990 (aged 34) | 0 | 1 | 1 | 0 | 0 | 0 |
| 10 | MF | (Argentina) Rodrigo Gómez | 2 January 1993 (aged 32) | 54 | 46 | 100 | 5 | 9 | 14 |
| 11 | FW | (Uruguay) Maicol Cabrera | 11 May 1996 (aged 29) | 0 | 13 | 13 | 0 | 5 | 5 |
| 11 | FW | (Brazil) Romário da Silva | 4 March 1990 (aged 35) | 0 | 23 | 23 | 0 | 3 | 3 |
| 12 | MF | (Honduras) Raúl Santos | 2 August 1992 (aged 32) | 238 | 42 | 280 | 7 | 1 | 8 |
| 14 | MF | (Honduras) Carlos Argueta | 6 January 1999 (aged 26) | 62 | 12 | 74 | 4 | 0 | 4 |
| 14 | FW | (Honduras) Aarón Barrios | 19 October 2004 (aged 20) | 13 | 5 | 18 | 0 | 0 | 0 |
| 15 | MF | (Honduras) Yoel Castillo | 10 November 2000 (aged 24) | 0 | 3 | 3 | 0 | 0 | 0 |
| 15 | FW | (Honduras) Andy Hernández | 15 December 2003 (aged 21) | 9 | 2 | 11 | 0 | 0 | 0 |
| 16 | FW | (Honduras) Edwin Munguía | 4 May 2006 (aged 19) | 3 | 1 | 4 | 0 | 0 | 0 |
| 17 | DF | (Honduras) Jhen Portillo | 2 December 2002 (aged 22) | 33 | 44 | 77 | 0 | 3 | 3 |
| 19 | FW | (Uruguay) Rodrigo De Olivera | 20 December 1994 (aged 30) | 0 | 26 | 26 | 0 | 12 | 12 |
| 21 | MF | (Honduras) Luís Meléndez | 26 January 2000 (aged 25) | 0 | 11 | 11 | 0 | 0 | 0 |
| 22 | GK | (Honduras) Luís Ortíz | 23 January 1998 (aged 27) | 0 | 37 | 37 | 0 | 0 | 0 |
| 23 | MF | (Honduras) Jonathan Núñez | 26 November 2001 (aged 23) | 106 | 13 | 119 | 3 | 1 | 4 |
| 23 | MF | (Honduras) José Reyes | 5 November 1997 (aged 27) | 0 | 22 | 22 | 0 | 4 | 4 |
| 24 | FW | (Honduras) Enne Velásquez | 27 October 1996 (aged 28) | 0 | 0 | 0 | 0 | 0 | 0 |
| 25 | GK | (Honduras) Marlon Licona | 9 February 1991 (aged 34) | 173 | 14 | 187 | 0 | 0 | 0 |
| 26 | DF | (Honduras) Luís Crisanto | 1 March 2000 (aged 25) | 0 | 21 | 21 | 0 | 0 | 0 |
| 27 | MF | (Honduras) Jefryn Macías | 2 January 2004 (aged 21) | 12 | 48 | 60 | 0 | 7 | 7 |
| 28 | DF | (Honduras) Adner Ávila | 15 May 2005 (aged 20) | 0 | 0 | 0 | 0 | 0 | 0 |
| 29 | FW | (Brazil) John Oliveira | 27 January 2000 (aged 25) | 0 | 33 | 33 | 0 | 14 | 14 |
| 31 | GK | (Honduras) John Turcios | 1 October 2001 (aged 23) | 0 | 1 | 1 | 0 | 0 | 0 |
| 33 | FW | (Honduras) Emilio Izaguirre | 22 September 2008 (aged 16) | 0 | 2 | 2 | 0 | 0 | 0 |
| 34 | DF | (Honduras) Giancarlos Sacaza | 18 January 2004 (aged 21) | 19 | 44 | 63 | 1 | 1 | 2 |
| 35 | DF | (Honduras) Cristopher Meléndez | 25 November 1997 (aged 27) | 161 | 36 | 197 | 5 | 1 | 6 |
| 38 | FW | (Honduras) Mathías Vásquez | 15 December 2006 (aged 18) | 17 | 22 | 39 | 7 | 5 | 12 |
| 42 | MF | (Honduras) Jonathan Argueta | 10 August 2007 (aged 17) | 11 | 8 | 19 | 1 | 0 | 1 |
| 43 | MF | (Honduras) José Oyuela | 22 November 2008 (aged 16) | 0 | 0 | 0 | 0 | 0 | 0 |
| 45 | MF | (Honduras) Cristopher Flores | 21 April 2005 (aged 20) | 0 | 0 | 0 | 0 | 0 | 0 |
| 51 | MF | (Honduras) Jordan García | 31 March 2006 (aged 19) | 4 | 4 | 8 | 0 | 2 | 2 |
| 53 | MF | (Honduras) Darell Oliva | 24 May 2008 (aged 17) | 0 | 6 | 6 | 0 | 0 | 0 |
| 56 | MF | (Honduras) Carlos Palma | 28 November 2007 (aged 17) | 0 | 19 | 19 | 0 | 1 | 1 |
| 62 | DF | (Honduras) Melvin Valladares | – | 0 | 1 | 1 | 0 | 0 | 0 |
| 63 | MF | (Honduras) Carlos Gómez | 23 July 2007 (aged 17) | 0 | 1 | 1 | 0 | 0 | 0 |
| 77 | MF | (Honduras) Carlos Mejía | 19 February 2000 (aged 25) | 136 | 34 | 170 | 15 | 3 | 18 |
| Managers | | (Argentina) Diego Vásquez | 3 July 1971 (aged 53) | 26 November 2023 – 11 August 2025 | | | | | |
| Managers | | (Spain) Javier López | 29 August 1975 (aged 49) | 11 August 2025 – | | | | | |

=== Goalkeeper's action ===
As of 24 May 2026

| Goalkeeper | Years evaluated | Games | Goals | Per. |
|---|---|---|---|---|
| (Honduras) Marlon Licona | 2010–2017, 2018–2023, 2024–present | 187 | 205 | 1.096 |
| (Honduras) Luís Ortíz | 2025–present | 37 | 41 | 1.108 |
| (Honduras) John Turcios | 2025–present | 1 | 2 | 2.000 |

=== International caps ===
As of 6 June 2026

This is a list of players that were playing for Motagua during the 2024–25 season and were called to represent Honduras at different international competitions.

| Player | Team | Event | Caps | Goals |
|---|---|---|---|---|
| Luís Crisanto | Adult | 2025 CONCACAF Gold Cup | 1 | 0 |
| Raúl Santos | Adult | 2026 FIFA World Cup qualification | 2 | 0 |
| Luís Vega | Adult | 2026 FIFA World Cup qualification | 3 | 0 |
| Luís Vega | Adult | Friendly v Peru and Argentina | 2 | 0 |
| Cristopher Meléndez | Adult | Friendly v Peru and Argentina | 2 | 0 |
| Giancarlos Sacaza | Adult | Friendly v Peru and Argentina | 2 | 0 |
| José Reyes | Adult | Friendly v Peru and Argentina | 2 | 0 |
| Enmanuel Martín | U-17 | 2025 FIFA U-17 World Cup | 2 | 0 |
| Darell Oliva | U-17 | 2025 FIFA U-17 World Cup | 2 | 0 |
| José Oyuela | U-17 | 2025 FIFA U-17 World Cup | 1 | 0 |

== Results ==
All times are local CST unless stated otherwise

=== Preseason and friendlies ===
| 9 July 2025 Friendly | Tela | 1–3 | Motagua | Tela |
| 16:00 | 10' | | 14' Meléndez; 37' Padilla; 71' Munguía | Stadium: Estadio León Gómez; Referee: Starting XI: 19 – Ortíz; 2 – Cardozo; 5 – Padilla; 6 – Zapata; 7 – Serrano; 12 – Santos; 14 – Argueta; 21 – Gómez; 26 – Meléndez; 29 – Jordán; 32 – Núñez |

| 11 July 2025 Friendly | Motagua | 3–0 | Olimpia | Houston, United States |
| 21:00 CST | Vásquez 50' 80'; Meléndez 62' | | | Stadium: Panther Stadium; Referee: Diego Montaño (MEX) Starting XI: 25 – Licona (substituted off) 69'; 6 – Zapata (substituted off) 69'; 7 – Serrano; 8 – Meléndez (substituted off); 9 – Jordán (substituted off) 46'; 10 – Gómez; 12 – Santos; 14 – Argueta (substituted off) 46'; 23 – Núñez; 26 – Crisanto; 35 – Meléndez; Substitutes; 38 – Vásquez (substituted on) 46'; 77 – Mejía (substituted on) 46'; 22 – Ortíz (substituted on) 69'; 27 – Macías (substituted on) 69'; 16 – Munguía |

| 9 January 2026 Friendly | Motagua (Honduras) | 1–2 | (El Salvador) Luis Ángel Firpo | Tegucigalpa |
| 20:00 | Vega 86' (pen.) | | Díaz; Claros | Stadium: Estadio Nacional; Referee: Starting XI: 22 – Ortíz; 2 – Cacho; 10 – Gómez; 12 – Santos; 16 – Munguía; 17 – Portillo; 23 – Reyes; 29 – Oliveira; 42 – Argueta; 56 – Palma; 77 – Mejía |

| 14 January 2026 Friendly | Motagua | 3–2 | Arsenal SAO | Amarateca |
| | Mejía da Silva; Gómez | | | Stadium: Complejo Pedro Atala Simón |

| 17 January 2026 Friendly | Pirata | 1–1 | Motagua | Nacaome |
| 17:00 | Bustillo 41' | | 9' Serrano | Stadium: Estadio José Elías Nazar; Referee: Starting XI: 22 – Ortíz; 5 – Padilla; 6 – Zapata; 7 – Serrano; 8 – Meléndez; 10 – Gómez; 12 – Santos; 29 – Oliveira; 34 – Sacaza; 35 – Meléndez; 77 – Mejía |

| 18 January 2026 Friendly | FAS | 0–4 | Motagua | San Lorenzo |
| 17:00 | | | 10' Oliva; 34' Barrios; 41' Vega; 90+5' Oliveira | Stadium: Estadio Ángel Augusto Martínez; Referee: Starting XI: 25 – Licona; 28 – Ávila; 33 – Izaguirre; 37 – Arana; 40 – Obando; 42 – Argueta; 43 – Oyuela; 50 – Barrios; 51 – García; 53 – Oliva; 63 – Gómez |

| 22 January 2026 Friendly | Hondupino | 0–1 | Motagua | Danlí |
| 18:00 | | | 72' Mejía | Stadium: Estadio Marcelo Tinoco; Referee: Starting XI: 25 – Licona; 4 – Vega; 5 – Padilla; 7 – Serrano; 8 – Meléndez; 11 – da Silva; 15 – Hernández; 26 – Crisanto; 29 – Oliveira; 34 – Sacaza; 37 – Arana |

| 29 March 2026 Friendly | Motagua | 2–2 | Olimpia | New Orleans |
| 19:00 CST | da Silva 71' (pen.); Meléndez 87' | | 2' Figueroa; 11' Chirinos | Stadium: Tad Gormley Stadium; Referee: Starting XI: 25 – Licona (substituted off) 66'; 5 – Padilla; 6 – Zapata (substituted off) 46'; 8 – Meléndez; 10 – Gómez (substituted off) 46'; 12 – Santos; 14 – Barrios (substituted off) 46'; 15 – Hernández; 26 – Crisanto; 27 – Macías (substituted off) 46'; 77 – Mejía; Substitutes; 7 – Serrano (substituted on) 46'; 11 – da Silva (substituted on) 46'; 19 – De Olivera (substituted on) 46'; 29 – Oliveira (substituted on) 46'; 31 – Turcios (substituted on) 66' |

| 20 June 2026 Friendly | Cedeño | 0–1 | Motagua | Choluteca |
| 17:00 | | | 88' De Olivera | Stadium: Estadio Emilio Williams Agasse; Referee: Starting XI: 25 – Licona; 4 – Bueso; 10 – Gómez; 15 – Hernández; 26 – Crisanto; 27 – Macías; 28 – Ávila; 33 – Izaguirre; 51 – Valladares; 56 – Palma; 80 – Oliva |

=== Apertura ===
| Week 1 | Bye |

| 26 July 2025 Week 2 | Génesis PN | 2–1 | Motagua | La Paz |
| 15:00 | Tejeda 62'; Paz 82' | Report | 90' Padilla | Stadium: Estadio Roberto Suazo Córdova; Referee: Saíd Martínez Starting XI: 25 – Licona; 2 – Cardozo; 5 – Padilla; 7 – Serrano; 8 – Meléndez (substituted off) 75'; 9 – Jordán (substituted off) 60'; 12 – Santos; 17 – Portillo (substituted off) 75'; 26 – Crisanto; 27 – Macías (substituted off) 46'; 42 – Argueta (substituted off) 46'; Substitutes; 21 – Meléndez (substituted on) 46'; 77 – Mejía (substituted on) 46'; 38 – Vásquez (substituted on) 60'; 6 – Zapata (substituted on) 75'; 11 – Cabrera (substituted on) 75' |
Note: All Wilmar Jordán, Luís Crisanto, Luís Meléndez and Maicol Cabrera made their league debuts.

| 2 August 2025 Week 3 | Motagua | 0–2 | Olimpia | Tegucigalpa |
| 17:15 | | Report | 14' Montiel; 78' Elis | Stadium: Estadio Nacional; Referee: Armando Castro Starting XI: 25 – Licona; 2 – Cardozo; 6 – Zapata (substituted off) 46'; 7 – Serrano; 8 – Meléndez (substituted off) 80'; 10 – Gómez; 12 – Santos; 26 – Crisanto (substituted off) 61'; 34 – Sacaza; 38 – Vásquez (substituted off) 62'; 77 – Mejía (substituted off) 71'; Substitutes; 17 – Portillo (substituted on) 46'; 14 – Argueta (substituted on) 61'; 11 – Cabrera (substituted on) 62'; 27 – Macías (substituted on) 71'; 21 – Meléndez (substituted on) 80' |

| 9 August 2025 Week 4 | Olancho | 3–1 | Motagua | Danlí |
| 19:30 | Almendárez 41' de Olivera 44' 90+2' | Report | 64' Cabrera | Stadium: Estadio Marcelo Tinoco; Referee: Arlington Escobar Starting XI: 25 – Licona; 2 – Cardozo; 10 – Gómez (substituted off) 78'; 11 – Cabrera; 12 – Santos; 17 – Portillo; 23 – Núñez (substituted off) 46'; 26 – Crisanto (substituted off) 46'; 27 – Macías (substituted off) 72'; 34 – Sacaza; 77 – Mejía (substituted off) 46'; Substitutes; 7 – Serrano (substituted on) 46'; 14 – Argueta (substituted on) 46'; 38 – Vásquez (substituted on) 46'; 15 – Castillo (substituted on) 72'; 8 – Meléndez (substituted on) 78' |
Note: Maicol Cabrera scored his first league goal. Yoel Castillo made his league debut.

| 17 August 2025 Week 5 | Motagua | 3–3 | Marathón | Tegucigalpa |
| 19:30 | Núñez 33'; Santos 55'; Gómez 60' | Report | 21' Figueroa; 29' 51' Vega | Stadium: Estadio Nacional; Referee: Jefferson Escobar Starting XI: 22 – Ortíz; 2 – Cardozo; 6 – Zapata; 7 – Serrano (substituted off) 84'; 8 – Meléndez; 10 – Gómez; 11 – Cabrera (substituted off) 46'; 12 – Santos; 23 – Núñez (substituted off) 46'; 26 – Crisanto (substituted off) 72'; 77 – Mejía (substituted off) 84'; Substitutes; 34 – Sacaza (substituted on) 46'; 38 – Vásquez (substituted on) 46'; 35 – Meléndez (substituted on) 72'; 14 – Argueta (substituted on) 84'; 27 – Macías (substituted on) 84' |
Note: Luís Ortíz made his league debut.

| 22 August 2025 Week 6 | Victoria | 0–1 | Motagua | La Ceiba |
| 19:30 | | Report | 43' Vásquez | Stadium: Estadio Nilmo Edwards; Referee: Melvin Matamoros Starting XI: 22 – Ortíz; 2 – Cardozo; 5 – Padilla; 7 – Serrano (substituted off) 60'; 8 – Meléndez (substituted off) 74'; 10 – Gómez; 12 – Santos; 17 – Portillo (substituted off) 79'; 38 – Vásquez (substituted off) 74'; 42 – Argueta (substituted off) 61'; 77 – Mejía; Substitutes; 27 – Macías (substituted on) 60'; 26 – Crisanto (substituted on) 61'; 11 – Cabrera (substituted on) 74'; 23 – Núñez (substituted on) 74'; 6 – Zapata (substituted on) 79' |
Note: Raúl Santos reached 300 official appearances with the club in all tournaments combined.

| 31 August 2025 Week 7 | Motagua | 3–2 | Real España | Tegucigalpa |
| 19:30 | Oliveira 33'; Meléndez 38' 65' | Report | 48' Mencía; 64' (pen.) Benavídez | Stadium: Estadio Nacional; Referee: Nelson Salgado Starting XI: 25 – Licona; 2 – Cardozo; 4 – Vega; 5 – Padilla (substituted off) 36'; 7 – Serrano; 8 – Meléndez; 10 – Gómez; 14 – Argueta (substituted off) 82'; 17 – Portillo; 29 – Oliveira (substituted off) 82'; 77 – Mejía (substituted off) 64'; Substitutes; 23 – Núñez (substituted on) 36'; 27 – Macías (substituted on) 64'; 34 – Sacaza (substituted on) 82'; 38 – Vásquez (substituted on) 82' |
Note: John Oliveira made his league debut and scored his first league goal.

| 10 September 2025 Week 8 | Choloma | 0–3 | Motagua | Choloma |
| 17:15 | | Report | 38' Oliveira; 57' 76' Cabrera | Stadium: Estadio Rubén Deras; Referee: Selvin Brown Starting XI: 25 – Licona; 2 – Cardozo; 4 – Vega (substituted off) 39'; 7 – Serrano; 8 – Meléndez (substituted off) 67'; 10 – Gómez; 12 – Santos; 17 – Portillo; 27 – Macías (substituted off) 59'; 29 – Oliveira (substituted off) 45+1'; 35 – Meléndez; Substitutes; 23 – Núñez (substituted on) 39'; 11 – Cabrera (substituted on) 45+1'; 38 – Vásquez (substituted on) 59'; 21 – Meléndez (substituted on) 67' |

| 13 September 2025 Week 9 | Motagua | 3–3 | UPNFM | Comayagua |
| 19:30 | Gómez 32' (pen.); Macías 82'; Meléndez 90+2' | Report | 19' Gutiérrez; 25' Martínez; 53' García | Stadium: Estadio Carlos Miranda; Referee: Merlin Soto Starting XI: 22 – Ortíz; 7 – Serrano (substituted off) 46'; 8 – Meléndez; 10 – Gómez; 11 – Cabrera (substituted off) 85'; 12 – Santos; 14 – Argueta (substituted off) 46'; 17 – Portillo (substituted off) 76'; 23 – Núñez (substituted off) 54'; 34 – Sacaza; 77 – Mejía; Substitutes; 27 – Macías (substituted on) 46'; 35 – Meléndez (substituted on) 46'; 38 – Vásquez (substituted on) 54'; 6 – Zapata (substituted on) 76'; 15 – Castillo (substituted on) 85' |
Note: Jefryn Macías scored his first league goal.

| 17 September 2025 Week 10 | Platense | 1–2 | Motagua | San Pedro Sula |
| 17:15 | Urbina 61' | Report | 42' Vásquez; 44' Portillo | Stadium: Estadio Olímpico Metropolitano; Referee: José Valladares Starting XI: 25 – Licona; 2 – Cardozo; 6 – Zapata; 7 – Serrano (substituted off) 69'; 8 – Meléndez; 12 – Santos; 17 – Portillo; 23 – Núñez (substituted off) 57'; 26 – Crisanto (substituted off) 46'; 38 – Vásquez (substituted off) 57'; 77 – Mejía (substituted off) 80'; Substitutes; 35 – Meléndez (substituted on) 46'; 4 – Vega (substituted on) 57'; 11 – Cabrera (substituted on) 57'; 27 – Macías (substituted on) 69'; 34 – Sacaza (substituted on) 80' |
Note: Marlon Licona reached 200 official appearances with the club in all tournaments combined. Jhen Portillo scored his first league goal.

| 20 September 2025 Week 11 | Motagua | 0–0 | Juticalpa | Tegucigalpa |
| 19:30 | | Report | | Stadium: Estadio Nacional; Referee: James Salinas Starting XI: 22 – Ortíz; 2 – Cardozo (substituted off) 61'; 4 – Vega; 7 – Serrano (substituted off) 46'; 10 – Gómez; 12 – Santos; 17 – Portillo; 23 – Núñez (substituted off) 46'; 38 – Vásquez; 42 – Argueta (substituted off) 46'; 77 – Mejía (substituted off) 47'; Substitutes; 8 – Meléndez (substituted on) 46'; 29 – Oliveira (substituted on) 46'; 35 – Meléndez (substituted on) 46'; 27 – Macías (substituted on) 47'; 34 – Sacaza (substituted on) 61' |
Note: Cristopher Meléndez reached 200 official appearances with the club in all tournaments combined.

| Week 12 | Bye |

| 4 October 2025 Week 13 | Motagua | 4–3 | Génesis PN | Tegucigalpa |
| 19:30 | Cabrera 14' 45+2'; Cardozo 40'; Oliveira 90' | Report | 20' Tejeda; 78' Moncada; 90+3' Miranda | Stadium: Estadio Nacional; Referee: Julio Güity Starting XI: 25 – Licona (substituted off) 69'; 2 – Cardozo; 10 – Gómez; 11 – Cabrera; 17 – Portillo; 21 – Meléndez (substituted off) 67'; 27 – Macías (substituted off) 75'; 34 – Sacaza; 38 – Vásquez (substituted off) 46'; 42 – Argueta; 51 – García (substituted off) 85'; Substitutes; 77 – Mejía (substituted on) 46'; 7 – Serrano (substituted on) 67'; 31 – Turcios (substituted on) 69'; 29 – Oliveira (substituted on) 75'; 23 – Núñez (substituted on) 85' |
Note: John Turcios made his league debut.

| 16 October 2025 Week 14 | Olimpia | 2–2 | Motagua | Tegucigalpa |
| 19:30 | Arboleda 13' (pen.); Moncada 90+7' | Report | 44' 86' Oliveira | Stadium: Estadio Nacional; Referee: Nelson Salgado Starting XI: 25 – Licona; 2 – Cardozo; 4 – Vega; 8 – Meléndez; 10 – Gómez (substituted off) 90'; 11 – Cabrera (substituted off) 53'; 12 – Santos; 17 – Portillo; 29 – Oliveira; 35 – Meléndez; 38 – Vásquez (substituted off) 61'; Substitutes; 27 – Macías (substituted on) 53'; 7 – Serrano (substituted on) 61'; 34 – Sacaza (substituted on) 90' |

| 20 November 2025 Week 15 | Motagua | 3–2 | Olancho | Tegucigalpa |
| 19:00 | Cardozo 50'; Macías 69'; Palma 82' | Report | 10' De Olivera; 67' López | Stadium: Estadio Nacional; Referee: Selvin Brown Starting XI: 25 – Licona; 2 – Cardozo; 7 – Serrano; 10 – Gómez; 14 – Argueta (substituted off) 46'; 17 – Portillo (substituted off) 64'; 27 – Macías (substituted off) 77'; 34 – Sacaza; 38 – Vásquez (substituted off) 46'; 56 – Palma; 77 – Mejía (substituted off) 46'; Substitutes; 8 – Meléndez (substituted on) 46'; 29 – Oliveira (substituted on) 46'; 35 – Meléndez (substituted on) 46'; 6 – Zapata (substituted on) 64'; 21 – Meléndez (substituted on) 77' |
Note: Carlos Palma scored his first league goal.

| 25 October 2025 Week 16 | Marathón | 1–0 | Motagua | San Pedro Sula |
| 15:00 | Messiniti 24' | Report | | Stadium: Estadio Yankel Rosenthal; Referee: Raúl Castro Starting XI: 22 – Ortíz; 2 – Cardozo; 4 – Vega (substituted off) 42'; 6 – Zapata (substituted off) 62'; 7 – Serrano; 10 – Gómez (substituted off) 89'; 11 – Cabrera (substituted off) 63'; 12 – Santos; 17 – Portillo; 26 – Crisanto (substituted off) 89'; 29 – Oliveira; Substitutes; 34 – Sacaza (substituted on) 42'; 77 – Mejía (substituted on) 62'; 35 – Meléndez (substituted on) 63'; 15 – Castillo (substituted on) 89'; 21 – Meléndez (substituted on) 89' |

| 1 November 2025 Week 17 | Motagua | 2–1 | Victoria | Tegucigalpa |
| 19:30 | Meléndez 21'; Serrano 32' | Report | 83' Sevilla | Stadium: Estadio Nacional; Referee: David Carrasco Starting XI: 22 – Ortíz; 7 – Serrano (substituted off) 80'; 8 – Meléndez (substituted off) 65'; 10 – Gómez; 12 – Santos; 17 – Portillo; 27 – Macías (substituted off) 80'; 29 – Oliveira (substituted off) 56'; 34 – Sacaza; 42 – Argueta (substituted off) 57'; 56 – Palma; Substitutes; 11 – Cabrera (substituted on) 56'; 35 – Meléndez (substituted on) 57'; 21 – Meléndez (substituted on) 65'; 26 – Crisanto (substituted on) 80'; 33 – Izaguirre (substituted on) 80' |
Note: Both Carlos Palma and Emilio Izaguirre made their league debuts.

| 23 November 2025 Week 18 | Real España | 1–2 | Motagua | San Pedro Sula |
| 19:30 | Souza 2' | Report | 12' Macías; 79' Oliveira | Stadium: Estadio General Francisco Morazán; Referee: Luís Mejía Starting XI: 22 – Ortíz; 4 – Vega; 7 – Serrano (substituted off) 77'; 8 – Meléndez; 10 – Gómez (substituted off) 77'; 12 – Santos; 17 – Portillo; 27 – Macías; 29 – Oliveira (substituted off) 86'; 35 – Meléndez; 56 – Palma (substituted off) 56'; Substitutes; 2 – Cardozo (substituted on) 56'; 21 – Meléndez (substituted on) 77'; 77 – Mejía (substituted on) 77'; 38 – Vásquez (substituted on) 86' |

| 9 November 2025 Week 19 | Motagua | 2–1 | Choloma | Juticalpa |
| 17:15 | Vásquez 14'; Macías 16' | Report | 49' Bermúdez | Stadium: Estadio Juan Ramón Brevé Vargas; Referee: Nelson Salgado Starting XI: 25 – Licona; 2 – Cardozo; 6 – Zapata (substituted off) 68'; 7 – Serrano; 14 – Argueta (substituted off) 62'; 17 – Portillo; 27 – Macías; 34 – Sacaza; 38 – Vásquez (substituted off) 68'; 56 – Palma (substituted off) 56'; 77 – Mejía (substituted off) 55'; Substitutes; 21 – Meléndez (substituted on) 55'; 23 – Núñez (substituted on) 56'; 42 – Argueta (substituted on) 62'; 16 – Munguía (substituted on) 68'; 63 – Gómez (substituted on) 68' |
Note: Carlos Gómez made his league debut.

| 27 November 2025 Week 20 | UPNFM | 0–0 | Motagua | Choluteca |
| 19:30 | | Report | | Stadium: Estadio Emilio Williams Agasse; Referee: Jefferson Escobar Starting XI: 22 – Ortíz; 2 – Cardozo; 4 – Vega (substituted off) 74'; 8 – Meléndez; 10 – Gómez (substituted off) 85'; 17 – Portillo; 27 – Macías (substituted off) 85'; 29 – Oliveira (substituted off) 82'; 35 – Meléndez; 56 – Palma; 77 – Mejía (substituted off) 74'; Substitutes; 34 – Sacaza (substituted on) 74'; 38 – Vásquez (substituted on) 74'; 53 – Oliva (substituted on) 82'; 21 – Meléndez (substituted on) 85'; 33 – Izaguirre (substituted on) 85' |
Note: Darell Oliva made his league debut.

| 2 December 2025 Week 21 | Motagua | 0–4 | Platense | Tegucigalpa |
| 19:30 | | Report | 36' Alberto; 42' Pozantes; 56' Puerto; 79' Pérez | Stadium: Estadio Nacional; Referee: Kevin Ulloa Starting XI: 22 – Ortíz; 2 – Cardozo; 4 – Vega (substituted off) 75'; 7 – Serrano; 8 – Meléndez; 10 – Gómez; 11 – Cabrera (substituted off) 46'; 17 – Portillo (substituted off) 46'; 23 – Núñez (substituted off) 60'; 27 – Macías; 42 – Argueta (substituted off) 46'; Substitutes; 6 – Zapata (substituted on) 46'; 14 – Argueta (substituted on) 46'; 38 – Vásquez (substituted on) 46'; 5 – Padilla (substituted on) 60'; 62 – Valladares (substituted on) 75' |
Note: Melvin Valladares made his league debut.

| 6 December 2025 Week 22 | Juticalpa | 1–7 | Motagua | Juticalpa |
| 19:30 | Villafranca 6' | Report | 17' (pen.) 49' (pen.) Gómez; 40' 75' Vásquez; 70' 79' García; 83' Mejía | Stadium: Estadio Juan Ramón Brevé Vargas; Referee: Arlington Escobar Starting XI: 22 – Ortíz (substituted off) 64'; 6 – Zapata; 10 – Gómez (substituted off) 58'; 12 – Santos; 21 – Meléndez (substituted off) 58'; 27 – Macías (substituted off) 46'; 34 – Sacaza; 35 – Meléndez (substituted off) 46'; 38 – Vásquez; 56 – Palma; 77 – Mejía; Substitutes; 7 – Serrano (substituted on) 46'; 14 – Argueta (substituted on) 46'; 5 – Padilla (substituted on) 58'; 51 – García (substituted on) 58'; 25 – Licona (substituted on) 64' |
Note: Jordan García scored his first league goal.

| 13 December 2025 Group A | Motagua | 0–3 | Real España | Tegucigalpa |
| 19:00 | | Report | 47' Cruz; 61' Tatum; 90+6' (pen.) Benavídez | Stadium: Estadio Nacional; Referee: Nelson Salgado Starting XI: 22 – Ortíz; 2 – Cardozo; 5 – Padilla; 8 – Meléndez; 10 – Gómez; 12 – Santos; 17 – Portillo; 27 – Macías (substituted off) 59'; 29 – Oliveira; 35 – Meléndez (substituted off) 46'; 77 – Mejía (substituted off) 59'; Substitutes; 14 – Argueta (substituted on) 46'; 7 – Serrano (substituted on) 59'; 38 – Vásquez (substituted on) 59' |

| 17 December 2025 Group A | Olimpia | 2–0 | Motagua | Tegucigalpa |
| 19:30 | Moncada 61'; Ortíz 72' (o.g.) | Report | | Stadium: Estadio Nacional; Referee: Selvin Brown Starting XI: 22 – Ortíz; 2 – Cardozo; 5 – Padilla (substituted off) 67'; 6 – Zapata (substituted off) 67'; 7 – Serrano; 8 – Meléndez; 10 – Gómez (substituted off) 76'; 23 – Núñez (substituted off) 69'; 27 – Macías (substituted off) 76'; 29 – Oliveira; 34 – Sacaza; Substitutes; 17 – Portillo (substituted on) 67'; 56 – Palma (substituted on) 67'; 14 – Argueta (substituted on) 69'; 38 – Vásquez (substituted on) 76'; 77 – Mejía (substituted on) 76' |

| 20 December 2025 Group A | Motagua | 1–1 | Olimpia | Tegucigalpa |
| 19:00 | Gómez 45' | Report | 52' Pinto | Stadium: Estadio Nacional; Referee: Armando Castro Starting XI: 25 – Licona; 2 – Cardozo; 7 – Serrano (substituted off) 63'; 8 – Meléndez (substituted off) 63'; 10 – Gómez; 12 – Santos; 17 – Portillo (substituted off) 88'; 23 – Núñez (substituted off) 72'; 29 – Oliveira (substituted off) 72'; 34 – Sacaza; 77 – Mejía; Substitutes; 5 – Padilla (substituted on) 63'; 27 – Macías (substituted on) 63'; 14 – Argueta (substituted on) 72'; 38 – Vásquez (substituted on) 72'; 6 – Zapata (substituted on) 88' |

| 23 December 2025 Group A | Real España | 1–1 | Motagua | San Pedro Sula |
| 19:00 | Benavídez 44' (pen.) | Report | 86' Mejía | Stadium: Estadio General Francisco Morazán; Referee: Nelson Salgado Starting XI: 25 – Licona; 4 – Vega (substituted off) 46'; 7 – Serrano (substituted off) 46'; 8 – Meléndez (substituted off) 69'; 10 – Gómez; 12 – Santos; 17 – Portillo (substituted off) 90+1'; 27 – Macías (substituted off) 82'; 29 – Oliveira; 34 – Sacaza; 35 – Meléndez; Substitutes; 5 – Padilla (substituted on) 46'; 77 – Mejía (substituted on) 46'; 56 – Palma (substituted on) 69'; 38 – Vásquez (substituted on) 82'; 6 – Zapata (substituted on) 90+1' |

=== Clausura ===
| Week 1 | Bye |

| 29 January 2026 Week 2 | Motagua | 2–0 | Platense | Tegucigalpa |
| 19:30 | da Silva 27'; Oliveira 75' | Report | | Stadium: Estadio Nacional; Referee: Kevin Ulloa Starting XI: 22 – Ortíz; 5 – Padilla (substituted off) 79'; 10 – Gómez; 11 – da Silva (substituted off) 72'; 12 – Santos; 15 – Hernández (substituted off) 46'; 17 – Portillo; 19 – De Olivera (substituted off) 67'; 27 – Macías (substituted off) 67'; 34 – Sacaza; 35 – Meléndez; Substitutes; 51 – García (substituted on) 46'; 7 – Serrano (substituted on) 67'; 29 – Oliveira (substituted on) 67'; 77 – Mejía (substituted on) 72'; 56 – Palma (substituted on) 79' |
Note: Both Romário da Silva and Rodrigo De Olivera made their league debuts. Romário da Silva scored his first league goal.

| 1 February 2026 Week 3 | Real España | 2–2 | Motagua | San Pedro Sula |
| 17:15 | Vuelto 39'; Hernández 83' (pen.) | Report | 44' De Olivera; 55' Padilla | Stadium: Estadio Francisco Morazán; Referee: Saíd Martínez Starting XI: 22 – Ortíz; 5 – Padilla; 10 – Gómez; 11 – da Silva (substituted off) 72'; 12 – Santos; 17 – Portillo; 19 – De Olivera (substituted off) 71'; 27 – Macías (substituted off) 79'; 34 – Sacaza; 35 – Meléndez; 51 – García (substituted off) 72'; Substitutes; 14 – Barrios (substituted on) 71'; 56 – Palma (substituted on) 72' (substituted off) 90+1'; 77 – Mejía (substituted on) 72'; 4 – Vega (substituted on) 79'; 26 – Crisanto (substituted on) 90+1' |
Note: Rodrigo De Olivera scored his first league goal.

| 7 February 2026 Week 4 | Motagua | 1–1 | Victoria | Tegucigalpa |
| 19:30 | Macías 35' | Report | 38' Espinal | Stadium: Estadio Nacional; Referee: David Cruz Starting XI: 22 – Ortíz; 5 – Padilla; 6 – Zapata (substituted off) 65'; 10 – Gómez; 11 – da Silva (substituted off) 84'; 12 – Santos; 19 – De Olivera; 27 – Macías (substituted off) 65'; 34 – Sacaza; 35 – Meléndez; 77 – Mejía (substituted off) 57'; Substitutes; 7 – Serrano (substituted on) 57'; 4 – Vega (substituted on) 65'; 8 – Meléndez (substituted on) 65'; 23 – Reyes (substituted on) 84' |
Note: José Reyes made his league debut.

| 11 February 2026 Week 5 | Génesis PN | 0–5 | Motagua | La Paz |
| 15:00 | | Report | 48' 81' (pen.) 87' De Olivera; 53' Padilla; 68' da Silva | Stadium: Estadio Roberto Suazo Córdova; Referee: José Valladares Starting XI: 22 – Ortíz; 4 – Vega; 5 – Padilla; 10 – Gómez (substituted off) 60'; 12 – Santos; 19 – De Olivera; 23 – Reyes (substituted off) 76'; 27 – Macías (substituted off) 62'; 34 – Sacaza; 35 – Meléndez (substituted off) 70'; 53 – Oliva (substituted off) 61'; Substitutes; 8 – Meléndez (substituted on) 60'; 7 – Serrano (substituted on) 61'; 11 – da Silva (substituted on) 62'; 26 – Crisanto (substituted on) 70'; 56 – Palma (substituted on) 76' |
Note: Rodrigo De Olivera scored his first league hat-trick.

| 15 February 2026 Week 6 | Motagua | 1–1 | Marathón | Tegucigalpa |
| 17:15 | da Silva 26' | Report | 73' Vega | Stadium: Estadio Nacional; Referee: Saíd Martínez Starting XI: 22 – Ortíz; 4 – Vega; 5 – Padilla; 10 – Gómez (substituted off) 54'; 11 – da Silva (substituted off) 77'; 12 – Santos; 19 – De Olivera; 23 – Reyes; 27 – Macías (substituted off) 61'; 34 – Sacaza; 35 – Meléndez (substituted off) 62'; Substitutes; 7 – Serrano (substituted on) 54'; 8 – Meléndez (substituted on) 61'; 26 – Crisanto (substituted on) 62'; 14 – Barrios (substituted on) 77' |

| 22 February 2026 Week 7 | Olimpia | 0–1 | Motagua | Tegucigalpa |
| 18:00 | | Report | 58' De Olivera | Stadium: Estadio Nacional; Referee: Armando Castro Starting XI: 22 – Ortíz; 4 – Vega; 5 – Padilla (substituted off) 85'; 8 – Meléndez (substituted off) 75'; 11 – da Silva; 17 – Portillo; 19 – De Olivera (substituted off) 86'; 23 – Reyes (substituted off) 81'; 27 – Macías; 34 – Sacaza; 35 – Meléndez; Substitutes; 10 – Gómez (substituted on) 75'; 12 – Santos (substituted on) 81'; 7 – Serrano (substituted on) 85'; 29 – Oliveira (substituted on) 86' |

| 25 February 2026 Week 8 | Juticalpa | 1–2 | Motagua | Catacamas |
| 17:15 | Ledesma 61' | Report | 66' (o.g.) Canales; 73' De Olivera | Stadium: Estadio Rubén Guifarro; Referee: Arlington Escobar Starting XI: 22 – Ortíz; 4 – Vega; 8 – Meléndez (substituted off) 65'; 11 – da Silva (substituted off) 46'; 17 – Portillo; 19 – De Olivera; 23 – Reyes (substituted off) 46'; 27 – Macías (substituted off) 46'; 34 – Sacaza; 35 – Meléndez; 56 – Palma (substituted off) 46'; Substitutes; 5 – Padilla (substituted on) 46'; 7 – Serrano (substituted on) 46'; 10 – Gómez (substituted on) 46'; 77 – Mejía (substituted on) 46'; 29 – Oliveira (substituted on) 65' |

| 1 March 2026 Week 9 | Motagua | 1–1 | Olancho | Tegucigalpa |
| 17:15 | Oliveira 90' | Report | 56' Zúniga | Stadium: Estadio Nacional; Referee: Melvin Matamoros Starting XI: 22 – Ortíz; 4 – Vega (substituted off) 62'; 5 – Padilla; 8 – Meléndez (substituted off) 73'; 11 – da Silva (substituted off) 58'; 17 – Portillo; 19 – De Olivera; 23 – Reyes (substituted off) 58'; 27 – Macías (substituted off) 62'; 34 – Sacaza; 35 – Meléndez; Substitutes; 10 – Gómez (substituted on) 58'; 77 – Mejía (substituted on) 58'; 12 – Santos (substituted on) 62'; 29 – Oliveira (substituted on) 62'; 7 – Serrano (substituted on) 73' |

| 7 March 2026 Week 10 | Choloma | 1–3 | Motagua | Choloma |
| 19:30 | Borja 33' | Report | 3' De Olivera; 58' (pen.) Gómez; 79' Mejía | Stadium: Estadio Rubén Deras; Referee: Julio Güity Starting XI: 22 – Ortíz; 5 – Padilla; 8 – Meléndez; 10 – Gómez; 11 – da Silva (substituted off) 65'; 12 – Santos; 17 – Portillo; 19 – De Olivera (substituted off) 85'; 27 – Macías (substituted off) 66'; 34 – Sacaza (substituted off) 85'; 35 – Meléndez (substituted off) 28'; Substitutes; 26 – Crisanto (substituted on) 28'; 23 – Reyes (substituted on) 65'; 77 – Mejía (substituted on) 66'; 2 – Cacho (substituted on) 85'; 29 – Oliveira (substituted on) 85' |
Note: Rodrigo Gómez reached 100 official appearances with the club in all tournaments combined. Pablo Cacho made his league debut.

| 11 March 2026 Week 11 | Motagua | 2–0 | UPNFM | Tegucigalpa |
| 17:15 | Reyes 28'; Gómez 46' | Report | | Stadium: Estadio Nacional; Referee: Darwin Gómez Starting XI: 22 – Ortíz; 7 – Serrano (substituted off) 58'; 10 – Gómez (substituted off) 78'; 12 – Santos (substituted off) 58'; 17 – Portillo; 19 – De Olivera; 23 – Reyes (substituted off) 46'; 26 – Crisanto; 34 – Sacaza; 56 – Palma; 77 – Mejía (substituted off) 59'; Substitutes; 8 – Meléndez (substituted on) 46'; 4 – Vega (substituted on) 58'; 27 – Macías (substituted on) 58'; 11 – da Silva (substituted on) 59'; 5 – Padilla (substituted on) 78' |
Note: José Reyes scored his first league goal.

| Week 12 | Bye |

| 19 March 2026 Week 13 | Platense | 0–1 | Motagua | Puerto Cortés |
| 15:00 | | Report | 69' Oliveira | Stadium: Estadio Excélsior; Referee: Kevin Ulloa Starting XI: 25 – Licona; 7 – Serrano; 10 – Gómez (substituted off) 46'; 12 – Santos; 17 – Portillo; 19 – De Olivera (substituted off) 67'; 23 – Reyes (substituted off) 82'; 26 – Crisanto; 34 – Sacaza; 56 – Palma (substituted off) 46'; 77 – Mejía (substituted off) 46'; Substitutes; 5 – Padilla (substituted on) 46'; 8 – Meléndez (substituted on) 46'; 11 – da Silva (substituted on) 46'; 29 – Oliveira (substituted on) 67'; 4 – Vega (substituted on) 82' |

| 22 March 2026 Week 14 | Motagua | 1–1 | Real España | Tegucigalpa |
| 17:00 | Oliveira 82' | Report | 34' Hernández | Stadium: Estadio Nacional; Referee: Jefferson Escobar Starting XI: 22 – Ortíz; 4 – Vega; 5 – Padilla; 8 – Meléndez (substituted off) 46'; 10 – Gómez (substituted off) 80'; 11 – da Silva (substituted off) 88'; 12 – Santos; 19 – De Olivera; 27 – Macías (substituted off) 62'; 34 – Sacaza; 35 – Meléndez; Substitutes; 23 – Reyes (substituted on) 46'; 29 – Oliveira (substituted on) 62'; 7 – Serrano (substituted on) 80'; 77 – Mejía (substituted on) 88' |
Note: Denis Meléndez reached 100 official appearances with the club in all tournaments combined.

| 16 April 2026 Week 15 | Victoria | 2–3 | Motagua | La Ceiba |
| 19:30 | Banegas 63'; Santos 90+6' (o.g.) | Report | 2' De Olivera; 37' Reyes; 90+2' (pen.) Gómez | Stadium: Estadio Nilmo Edwards; Referee: Armando Castro Starting XI: 22 – Ortíz; 7 – Serrano (substituted off) 76'; 8 – Meléndez (substituted off) 76'; 11 – da Silva (substituted off) 65'; 12 – Santos; 17 – Portillo; 19 – De Olivera (substituted off) 90+2'; 23 – Reyes; 26 – Crisanto (substituted off) 90+2'; 34 – Sacaza; 56 – Palma; Substitutes; 77 – Mejía (substituted on) 65'; 10 – Gómez (substituted on) 76'; 27 – Macías (substituted on) 76'; 14 – Barrios (substituted on) 90+2'; 35 – Meléndez (substituted on) 90+2' |

| 5 April 2026 Week 16 | Motagua | 3–1 | Génesis PN | Tegucigalpa |
| 17:15 | Oliveira 15'; Reyes 79'; Macías 90+5' | Report | 90' (pen.) Araújo | Stadium: Estadio Nacional; Referee: Julio Güity Starting XI: 22 – Ortíz; 7 – Serrano; 8 – Meléndez (substituted off) 54'; 10 – Gómez (substituted off) 77'; 11 – da Silva (substituted off) 54'; 12 – Santos; 17 – Portillo (substituted off) 54'; 26 – Crisanto; 29 – Oliveira (substituted off) 62'; 34 – Sacaza; 56 – Palma; Substitutes; 4 – Vega (substituted on) 54'; 23 – Reyes (substituted on) 54'; 53 – Oliva (substituted on) 54'; 19 – De Olivera (substituted on) 62'; 27 – Macías (substituted on) 77' |

| 9 April 2026 Week 17 | Marathón | 1–0 | Motagua | San Pedro Sula |
| 19:30 | Vega 30' | Report | | Stadium: Estadio Francisco Morazán; Referee: Jefferson Escobar Starting XI: 22 – Ortíz; 4 – Vega (substituted off) 90+2'; 5 – Padilla; 8 – Meléndez (substituted off) 61'; 11 – da Silva (substituted off) 46'; 12 – Santos; 19 – De Olivera; 23 – Reyes; 27 – Macías (substituted off) 46'; 34 – Sacaza; 35 – Meléndez (substituted off) 90+2'; Substitutes; 7 – Serrano (substituted on) 46'; 29 – Oliveira (substituted on) 46'; 10 – Gómez (substituted on) 61'; 14 – Barrios (substituted on) 90+2'; 17 – Portillo (substituted on) 90+2' |
Note: Jorge Serrano reached 100 official appearances with the club in all tournaments combined.

| 12 April 2026 Week 18 | Motagua | 0–1 | Olimpia | Tegucigalpa |
| 17:15 | | Report | 14' Rodríguez | Stadium: Estadio Nacional; Referee: Saíd Martínez Starting XI: 22 – Ortíz; 4 – Vega (substituted off) 86'; 5 – Padilla; 10 – Gómez (substituted off) 46'; 11 – da Silva (substituted off) 73'; 12 – Santos; 19 – De Olivera; 23 – Reyes; 27 – Macías (substituted off) 73'; 34 – Sacaza; 35 – Meléndez; Substitutes; 7 – Serrano (substituted on) 46'; 8 – Meléndez (substituted on) 73'; 14 – Barrios (substituted on) 73'; 17 – Portillo (substituted on) 86' |

| 19 April 2026 Week 19 | Motagua | 2–1 | Juticalpa | Tegucigalpa |
| 17:15 | Macías 52'; Oliveira 74' | Report | 47' Fajardo | Stadium: Estadio Nacional; Referee: José Valladares Starting XI: 22 – Ortíz; 4 – Vega (substituted off) 76'; 5 – Padilla; 8 – Meléndez (substituted off) 57'; 17 – Portillo; 19 – De Olivera; 23 – Reyes (substituted off) 62'; 27 – Macías (substituted off) 56'; 34 – Sacaza; 35 – Meléndez; 53 – Oliva (substituted off) 56'; Substitutes; 7 – Serrano (substituted on) 56'; 29 – Oliveira (substituted on) 56'; 11 – da Silva (substituted on) 57'; 10 – Gómez (substituted on) 62'; 12 – Santos (substituted on) 76' |

| 23 April 2026 Week 20 | Olancho | 0–0 | Motagua | Juticalpa |
| 19:30 | | Report | | Stadium: Estadio Juan Ramón Brevé Vargas; Referee: Luís Mejía Starting XI: 22 – Ortíz; 7 – Serrano (substituted off) 68'; 8 – Meléndez (substituted off) 68'; 11 – da Silva (substituted off) 79'; 12 – Santos; 17 – Portillo; 19 – De Olivera (substituted off) 79'; 23 – Reyes; 34 – Sacaza; 35 – Meléndez (substituted off) 57'; 56 – Palma; Substitutes; 26 – Crisanto (substituted on) 57'; 10 – Gómez (substituted on) 68'; 27 – Macías (substituted on) 68'; 29 – Oliveira (substituted on) 79'; 77 – Mejía (substituted on) 79' |

| 26 April 2026 Week 21 | Motagua | 5–1 | Choloma | Tegucigalpa |
| 17:15 | Meléndez 21'; Oliveira 32'; Portillo 45+5'; De Olivera 66' 77' | Report | 39' Aceituno | Stadium: Estadio Nacional; Attendance: Closed doors Referee: Selvin Brown Starting XI: 22 – Ortíz; 7 – Serrano (substituted off) 69'; 8 – Meléndez; 10 – Gómez; 11 – da Silva (substituted off) 65'; 12 – Santos; 17 – Portillo; 29 – Oliveira (substituted off) 64'; 34 – Sacaza (substituted off) 69'; 35 – Meléndez; 56 – Palma (substituted off) 46'; Substitutes; 5 – Padilla (substituted on) 46'; 19 – De Olivera (substituted on) 64'; 27 – Macías (substituted on) 65'; 2 – Cacho (substituted on) 69'; 53 – Oliva (substituted on) 69' |
Note: After this result, the club qualified to the 2026 CONCACAF Central American Cup.

| 30 April 2026 Week 22 | UPNFM | 2–1 | Motagua | Choluteca |
| 19:00 | Peña 54' 78' | Report | 4' Serrano | Stadium: Estadio Emilio Williams Agasse; Referee: Raúl Castro Starting XI: 22 – Ortíz; 5 – Padilla; 7 – Serrano (substituted off) 71'; 8 – Meléndez (substituted off) 55'; 10 – Gómez; 12 – Santos; 17 – Portillo; 29 – Oliveira; 34 – Sacaza (substituted off) 55'; 42 – Argueta (substituted off) 55'; 53 – Oliva (substituted off) 57'; Substitutes; 2 – Cacho (substituted on) 55'; 26 – Crisanto (substituted on) 55'; 27 – Macías (substituted on) 55'; 11 – da Silva (substituted on) 57'; 19 – De Olivera (substituted on) 71' |

| 3 May 2026 Group B | Génesis PN | 1–1 | Motagua | Comayagua |
| 18:15 | Araújo 59' (pen.) | Report | 31' (pen.) Gómez | Stadium: Estadio Carlos Miranda; Referee: Nelson Salgado Starting XI: 22 – Ortíz; 5 – Padilla; 7 – Serrano (substituted off) 69'; 10 – Gómez (substituted off) 69'; 11 – da Silva (substituted off) 69'; 12 – Santos; 17 – Portillo; 19 – De Olivera; 23 – Reyes (substituted off) 83'; 34 – Sacaza; 35 – Meléndez; Substitutes; 27 – Macías (substituted on) 69'; 29 – Oliveira (substituted on) 69'; 77 – Mejía (substituted on) 69'; 8 – Meléndez (substituted on) 83' |

| 9 May 2026 Group B | Motagua | 1–2 | Olancho | Tegucigalpa |
| 18:00 | De Olivera 32' | Report | 59' (pen.) López; 88' (pen.) Zúniga | Stadium: Estadio Nacional; Referee: José Valladares Starting XI: 22 – Ortíz; 5 – Padilla; 7 – Serrano (substituted off) 89'; 8 – Meléndez (substituted off) 68'; 10 – Gómez (substituted off) 68'; 11 – da Silva (substituted off) 62'; 12 – Santos; 17 – Portillo (substituted off) 89'; 19 – De Olivera; 34 – Sacaza; 35 – Meléndez; Substitutes; 27 – Macías (substituted on) 62'; 23 – Reyes (substituted on) 68'; 29 – Oliveira (substituted on) 68'; 6 – Zapata (substituted on) 89'; 77 – Mejía (substituted on) 89' |

| 12 May 2026 Group B | Olancho | 0–2 | Motagua | Juticalpa |
| 18:00 | | Report | 21' Reyes; 51' De Olivera | Stadium: Estadio Juan Ramón Brevé Vargas; Referee: Armando Castro Starting XI: 22 – Ortíz; 4 – Vega (substituted off) 60'; 5 – Padilla; 7 – Serrano (substituted off) 89'; 8 – Meléndez (substituted off) 89'; 11 – da Silva (substituted off) 60'; 17 – Portillo; 19 – De Olivera (substituted off) 69'; 23 – Reyes; 34 – Sacaza; 35 – Meléndez; Substitutes; 12 – Santos (substituted on) 60'; 27 – Macías (substituted on) 60'; 29 – Oliveira (substituted on) 69'; 26 – Crisanto (substituted on) 89'; 56 – Palma (substituted on) 89' |

| 18 May 2026 Group B | Motagua | 2–1 | Génesis PN | Tegucigalpa |
| 18:00 | Sacaza 8'; Portillo 47' | Report | 15' Arzú | Stadium: Estadio Nacional; Referee: Luís Mejía Starting XI: 22 – Ortíz; 4 – Vega; 5 – Padilla; 7 – Serrano (substituted off) 88'; 8 – Meléndez (substituted off) 84'; 17 – Portillo; 19 – De Olivera (substituted off) 79'; 23 – Reyes; 27 – Macías (substituted off) 79'; 34 – Sacaza; 35 – Meléndez; Substitutes; 10 – Gómez (substituted on) 79'; 29 – Oliveira (substituted on) 79'; 12 – Santos (substituted on) 84'; 26 – Crisanto (substituted on) 88' |

| 21 May 2026 Final | Marathón | 1–1 | Motagua | San Pedro Sula |
| 20:00 | Farioli 90+4' | Report | 77' Oliveira | Stadium: Estadio Francisco Morazán; Referee: Nelson Salgado Starting XI: 22 – Ortíz; 4 – Vega; 5 – Padilla; 7 – Serrano (substituted off) 90+1'; 8 – Meléndez (substituted off) 84'; 17 – Portillo; 19 – De Olivera (substituted off) 70'; 23 – Reyes (substituted off) 84'; 27 – Macías; 34 – Sacaza; 35 – Meléndez; Substitutes; 29 – Oliveira (substituted on) 70'; 10 – Gómez (substituted on) 84'; 12 – Santos (substituted on) 84'; 26 – Crisanto (substituted on) 90+1' |

| 24 May 2026 Final | Motagua | 0–0 (a.e.t.) (4–2 p) | Marathón | Tegucigalpa |
| 17:00 | | Report | | Stadium: Estadio Nacional; Referee: Saíd Martínez Starting XI: 22 – Ortíz; 4 – Vega (substituted off) 103'; 5 – Padilla; 7 – Serrano; 8 – Meléndez (substituted off) 74'; 17 – Portillo; 19 – De Olivera (substituted off) 70'; 23 – Reyes (substituted off) 119'; 27 – Macías (substituted off) 102'; 34 – Sacaza; 35 – Meléndez; Substitutes; 29 – Oliveira (substituted on) 70'; 10 – Gómez (substituted on) 74'; 77 – Mejía (substituted on) 102'; 12 – Santos (substituted on) 103'; 15 – Hernández (substituted on) 119' |
| | Penalties |
| | Gómez (penalty scored); Oliveira (penalty scored); Hernández (penalty scored); Portillo (penalty scored) | | (penalty missed) Castillo; (penalty scored) Sorto; (penalty scored) Castillo; (penalty missed) Ramos |
Note: Luís Vega reached 100 official appearances with the club in all tournaments combined. Rodrigo Gómez reached 100 league appearances with the club. After this result, the club qualified to the 2026 Honduran Supercup.

=== CONCACAF Central American Cup ===
F.C. Motagua qualified to the 2025 CONCACAF Central American Cup as winners of the 2024–25 Apertura domestic league.

| 29 July 2025 Group C | Verdes (Belize) | 1–4 | (Honduras) Motagua | Belmopan, Belize |
| 18:00 | López 83' | Report | 16' Mejía; 21' Serrano; 55' Santos; 85' Munguía | Stadium: FFB Stadium; Referee: Waldir García (SLV) Starting XI: 25 – Licona; 2 – Cardozo; 6 – Zapata; 7 – Serrano (substituted off) 80'; 8 – Meléndez (substituted off) 68'; 9 – Jordán (substituted off) 57'; 10 – Gómez (substituted off) 81'; 12 – Santos; 34 – Sacaza; 35 – Meléndez; 77 – Mejía (substituted off) 67'; Substitutes; 38 – Vásquez (substituted on) 57'; 27 – Macías (substituted on) 67'; 5 – Padilla (substituted on) 68'; 16 – Munguía (substituted on) 80'; 11 – Cabrera (substituted on) 81' |
Note: All Wilmar Jordán, Edwin Munguía and Maicol Cabrera made their international debuts. Both Jorge Serrano and Edwin Munguía scored their first international goals.

| 5 August 2025 Group C | Motagua (Honduras) | 2–1 | (Panama) Independiente | Tegucigalpa, Honduras |
| 20:00 | Gómez 55' (pen.); Cabrera 57' | Report | 71' Valverde | Stadium: Estadio Nacional; Referee: Cristhofer Corado (GUA) Starting XI: 25 – Licona; 2 – Cardozo; 6 – Zapata (substituted off) 46'; 7 – Serrano (substituted off) 68'; 8 – Meléndez (substituted off) 46'; 10 – Gómez (substituted off) 78'; 11 – Cabrera; 12 – Santos; 34 – Sacaza; 35 – Meléndez; 77 – Mejía (substituted off) 78'; Substitutes; 17 – Portillo (substituted on) 46'; 27 – Macías (substituted on) 46'; 5 – Padilla (substituted on) 68'; 14 – Argueta (substituted on) 78'; 21 – Meléndez (substituted on) 78' |
Note: Maicol Cabrera scored his first international goal. Luís Meléndez made his international debut.

| 14 August 2025 Group C | Motagua (Honduras) | 0–0 | (Costa Rica) Cartaginés | Tegucigalpa, Honduras |
| 20:00 | | Report | | Stadium: Estadio Nacional; Attendance: 2,447; Referee: Guido González (USA) Starting XI: 22 – Ortíz; 2 – Cardozo; 5 – Padilla (substituted off) 74'; 6 – Zapata; 7 – Serrano; 8 – Meléndez; 10 – Gómez (substituted off) 64'; 11 – Cabrera (substituted off) 84'; 12 – Santos; 35 – Meléndez (substituted off) 74'; 77 – Mejía; Substitutes; 23 – Núñez (substituted on) 64'; 26 – Crisanto (substituted on) 74'; 27 – Macías (substituted on) 74'; 9 – Jordán (substituted on) 84' |
Note: Both Luís Ortíz and Luís Crisanto made their international debuts.

| 26 August 2025 Group C | Saprissa (Costa Rica) | 0–0 | (Honduras) Motagua | San José, Costa Rica |
| 20:00 | | Report | | Stadium: Estadio Ricardo Saprissa Aymá; Attendance: 13,403; Referee: Daniel Quintero (MEX) Starting XI: 22 – Ortíz; 2 – Cardozo; 5 – Padilla; 6 – Zapata (substituted off) 46'; 7 – Serrano (substituted off) 86'; 8 – Meléndez; 10 – Gómez (substituted off) 86'; 12 – Santos; 29 – Oliveira (substituted off) 59'; 35 – Meléndez; 77 – Mejía (substituted off) 81'; Substitutes; 17 – Portillo (substituted on) 46'; 38 – Vásquez (substituted on) 59'; 27 – Macías (substituted on) 81'; 26 – Crisanto (substituted on) 86'; 34 – Sacaza (substituted on) 86' |
Note: John Oliveira made his international debut.

| 23 September 2025 Quarterfinals | Alajuelense (Costa Rica) | 0–1 | (Honduras) Motagua | Alajuela, Costa Rica |
| 20:00 | | Report | 90+2' Vásquez | Stadium: Estadio Alejandro Morera Soto; Referee: Ismael López (MEX) Starting XI: 22 – Ortíz; 2 – Cardozo; 4 – Vega; 7 – Serrano (substituted off) 77'; 8 – Meléndez; 10 – Gómez (substituted off) 77'; 12 – Santos; 14 – Argueta (substituted off) 71'; 17 – Portillo; 29 – Oliveira (substituted off) 55'; 77 – Mejía (substituted off) 46'; Substitutes; 27 – Macías (substituted on) 46'; 11 – Cabrera (substituted on) 55'; 23 – Núñez (substituted on) 71'; 21 – Meléndez (substituted on) 77'; 38 – Vásquez (substituted on) 77' |
Note: Mathías Vásquez scored his first international goal. The club obtained its first ever official victory over Liga Deportiva Alajuelense and its first official victory at Costa Rica since 1974.

| 30 September 2025 Quarterfinals | Motagua (Honduras) | 1–2 | (Costa Rica) Alajuelense | Tegucigalpa, Honduras |
| 20:00 | Gómez 24' (pen.) | Report | 30' Campbell; 90+1' Campos | Stadium: Estadio Nacional; Referee: Julio Luna (GUA) Starting XI: 22 – Ortíz; 2 – Cardozo; 4 – Vega; 7 – Serrano (substituted off) 85'; 8 – Meléndez; 10 – Gómez (substituted off) 84'; 17 – Portillo; 23 – Núñez (substituted off) 66'; 29 – Oliveira (substituted off) 85'; 35 – Meléndez; 77 – Mejía (substituted off) 59'; Substitutes; 27 – Macías (substituted on) 59'; 26 – Crisanto (substituted on) 66'; 21 – Meléndez (substituted on) 84'; 34 – Sacaza (substituted on) 85'; 38 – Vásquez (substituted on) 85' |

| 21 October 2025 Play-in | Cartaginés (Costa Rica) | 1–0 | (Honduras) Motagua | Cartago, Costa Rica |
| 20:00 | Castro 90+2' | Report | | Stadium: Estadio José Rafael Fello Meza Ivankovich; Referee: Jorge Leira (PAN) Starting XI: 25 – Licona; 2 – Cardozo; 4 – Vega; 6 – Zapata (substituted off) 78'; 7 – Serrano; 8 – Meléndez (substituted off) 73'; 10 – Gómez; 12 – Santos; 29 – Oliveira; 35 – Meléndez (substituted off) 68'; 77 – Mejía (substituted off) 67'; Substitutes; 27 – Macías (substituted on) 67'; 26 – Crisanto (substituted on) 68'; 21 – Meléndez (substituted on) 73'; 17 – Portillo (substituted on) 78' |

| 28 October 2025 Play-in | Motagua (Honduras) | 1–3 | (Costa Rica) Cartaginés | Tegucigalpa, Honduras |
| 20:00 | Portillo 71' | Report | 56' Alfaro; 73' Ureña; 78' Quiroga | Stadium: Estadio Nacional; Attendance: 5,846; Referee: Sergio Reyna (GUA) Starting XI: 22 – Ortíz; 4 – Vega (substituted off) 76'; 7 – Serrano (substituted off) 60'; 8 – Meléndez (substituted off) 60'; 10 – Gómez; 12 – Santos; 17 – Portillo; 27 – Macías (substituted off) 55'; 29 – Oliveira; 34 – Sacaza; 35 – Meléndez; Substitutes; 38 – Vásquez (substituted on) 55'; 11 – Cabrera (substituted on) 60'; 14 – Argueta (substituted on) 60'; 28 – Ávila (substituted on) 76' |
Note: Jhen Portillo scored his first international goal. Adner Ávila made his international debut.

== Statistics ==
As of 20 June 2026

| Competition | GP | GW | GD | GL | GF | GA | GD | CS | SG | Per |
|---|---|---|---|---|---|---|---|---|---|---|
| Liga Nacional | 50 | 23 | 16 | 11 | 84 | 61 | +23 | 12 | 11 | 56.67% |
| CONCACAF Central American Cup | 8 | 3 | 2 | 3 | 9 | 8 | +1 | 3 | 3 | 45.83% |
| Others | 9 | 6 | 2 | 1 | 19 | 8 | +11 | 4 | 0 | 74.07% |
| Totals | 67 | 32 | 20 | 15 | 112 | 77 | +35 | 19 | 14 | 57.71% |
