= 2026–27 F.C. Motagua season =

Motagua
2026–27 season
- Chairman: Eduardo Atala
- Manager: Javier López
- Stadium: Estadio Nacional
- Apertura: 3rd
- Clausura: TBD
- Honduran Supercup: Finalist
- CONCACAF Central American Cup: Semifinalist
- Top goalscorer: League: De Olivera (4); All: De Olivera (6)
Home colours	Away colours	Third colours
- All statistics correct as of 1 November 2026.

The 2026–27 season will be F.C. Motagua's 80th season in existence and the club's 61st consecutive season in the top fight of Honduran football. In addition to the domestic league, the club will also compete in the 2026 CONCACAF Central American Cup and the 2026 Honduran Supercup

== Overview ==
The club will try to improve their 2025–26 season where they won one out of three tournaments they competed on. On 16 September, the club qualified to the 2027 CONCACAF Champions Cup after defeating Salvadoran side Alianza 3–0 on aggregate. On 29 October, the club lost 1–2 on aggregate against Liga Deportiva Alajuelense in the 2026 CONCACAF Central American Cup semifinals.

== Kits ==
The 2026–27 home, away and third kits were published on 9 July. This marks their first season with their new kit sponsor Fanatics.

Manufacturer		Main sponsor	
Fanatics		Pepsi	
Home	Away	Alternative	Goalkeeper

== Players ==
=== Transfers in ===
Player	Contract date	Moving from
(Honduras) Jesús Bernárdez	12 May 2026	(Costa Rica) Sporting
(Italy) Valerio Marinacci	29 May 2026	(Italy) Enna
(Honduras) Jeffry Miranda	30 June 2026	(Honduras) Génesis PN
(Costa Rica) Jonathan Moya	6 July 2026	(Saudi Arabia) Al-Bukiryah

=== Transfers out ===
Player	Released date	Moving to
(Honduras) Carlos Meléndez	12 June 2026	TBD
(Honduras) Raúl Santos	12 June 2026	(Honduras) UPNFM
(Brazil) John Oliveira	22 June 2026	(Uruguay) Danubio
(Honduras) Carlos Mejía	29 June 2026	(Honduras) UPNFM
(Honduras) Luís Meléndez	9 July 2026	(Honduras) Atlético Independiente

=== Squad ===
As of 7 November 2026

- Only league matches into account

No.	Pos.	Player name	Date of birth and age	Games played			Goals scored		
				< 25/26	26/27	Total	< 25/26	26/27	Total
1	GK	(Honduras) John Turcios	1 October 2001 (aged 24)	1	0	1	0	0	0
3	DF	(Honduras) Pablo Cacho	29 September 2001 (aged 24)	3	11	14	0	0	0
4	DF	(Honduras) Luis Vega	28 February 2002 (aged 24)	84	8	92	7	0	7
5	MF	(Honduras) Óscar Padilla	7 November 1992 (aged 33)	47	13	60	4	1	5
6	DF	(Honduras) Riky Zapata	23 November 1997 (aged 28)	70	0	70	1	0	1
7	MF	(Panama) Jorge Serrano	19 January 1998 (aged 28)	96	4	100	7	1	8
8	MF	(Honduras) Denis Meléndez	22 July 1995 (aged 30)	94	9	103	7	2	9
9	FW	(Costa Rica) Jonathan Moya	6 January 1992 (aged 34)	0	10	10	0	3	3
10	MF	(Argentina) Rodrigo Gómez	2 January 1993 (aged 33)	100	11	111	14	1	15
11	FW	(Brazil) Romário da Silva	4 March 1990 (aged 36)	23	0	23	3	0	3
14	FW	(Honduras) Aarón Barrios	19 October 2004 (aged 21)	18	7	25	0	2	2
15	FW	(Honduras) Andy Hernández	15 December 2003 (aged 22)	11	4	15	0	0	0
16	MF	(Honduras) Carlos Palma	28 November 2007 (aged 18)	19	2	21	1	0	1
17	DF	(Honduras) Jhen Portillo	2 December 2002 (aged 23)	77	13	90	3	2	5
19	FW	(Uruguay) Rodrigo De Olivera	20 December 1994 (aged 31)	26	14	40	12	4	16
21	DF	(Honduras) Jesús Bernárdez	14 June 1999 (aged 27)	0	8	8	0	0	0
22	GK	(Honduras) Luís Ortíz	23 January 1998 (aged 28)	37	13	50	0	0	0
23	MF	(Honduras) José Reyes	5 November 1997 (aged 28)	22	13	35	4	2	6
24	MF	(Honduras) Jordan García	31 March 2006 (aged 20)	8	9	17	2	1	3
25	GK	(Honduras) Marlon Licona	9 February 1991 (aged 35)	187	1	188	0	0	0
26	DF	(Honduras) Luís Crisanto	1 March 2000 (aged 26)	21	9	30	0	0	0
27	MF	(Honduras) Jefryn Macías	2 January 2004 (aged 22)	60	12	72	7	0	7
28	DF	(Honduras) Adner Ávila	15 May 2005 (aged 21)	0	2	2	0	0	0
30	FW	(Honduras) Jeffry Miranda	3 September 2002 (aged 23)	0	9	9	0	1	1
33	FW	(Honduras) Emilio Izaguirre	22 September 2008 (aged 17)	2	2	4	0	0	0
34	DF	(Honduras) Giancarlos Sacaza	18 January 2004 (aged 22)	63	12	75	2	0	2
35	DF	(Honduras) Cristopher Meléndez	25 November 1997 (aged 28)	197	11	208	6	1	7
36	DF	(Italy) Valerio Marinacci	5 April 2003 (aged 23)	0	9	9	0	0	0
42	MF	(Honduras) Jonathan Argueta	10 August 2007 (aged 18)	19	1	20	1	0	1
62	DF	(Honduras) Melvin Valladares	22 January 2008 (aged 18)	1	0	1	0	0	0
63	MF	(Honduras) Carlos Gómez	23 July 2007 (aged 18)	1	0	1	0	0	0
80	MF	(Honduras) Darell Oliva	24 May 2008 (aged 18)	6	5	11	0	0	0
Manager		(Spain) Javier López	29 August 1975 (aged 49)	11 August 2025 –					

=== Goalkeeper's action ===
As of 7 November 2026

Goalkeeper	Years evaluated	Games	Goals	Per.
(Honduras) Luís Ortíz	2025–present	50	50	1.000
(Honduras) Marlon Licona	2010–2017, 2018–2023, 2024–present	188	207	1.101
(Honduras) John Turcios	2025–present	1	2	2.000

=== International caps ===
As of 5 October 2026

This is a list of players that were playing for Motagua during the 2026–27 season and were called to represent Honduras at different international competitions.

Player	Team	Event	Caps	Goals
Cristopher Meléndez	Adult	2026–27 CONCACAF Nations League	3	0
José Reyes	Adult	2026–27 CONCACAF Nations League	3	0
Giancarlos Sacaza	Adult	2026–27 CONCACAF Nations League	3	0
Luís Vega	Adult	2026–27 CONCACAF Nations League	3	0
Jhen Portillo	Adult	2026–27 CONCACAF Nations League	1	0

== Results ==
All times are local CST unless stated otherwise

=== Preseason and friendlies ===
4 July 2026 Friendly	FAS	1–7	Motagua	San Lorenzo
16:00			5' (pen.) Gómez; 18' Miranda; Barrios; Reyes	Stadium: Estadio Ángel Augusto Martínez; Referee: Starting XI: 25 – Licona; 4 – Vega; 10 – Gómez; 14 – Barrios; 17 – Ramos; 21 – Miranda; 23 – Reyes; 26 – Crisanto; 27 – Macías; 28 – Ávila; 56 – Palma

8 July 2026 Friendly	Motagua	8–0	Arsenal SAO	Amarateca
	Gómez; De Olivera; Barrios; García; Oliva; Meléndez; Bernárdez			Stadium: Complejo Pedro Atala Simón

11 July 2026 Friendly	Olancho	1–1	Motagua	Catacamas
17:00	Andino		83' De Olivera	Stadium: Estadio Rubén Guifarro; Referee: Starting XI: 22 – Ortíz; 7 – Serrano; 8 – Meléndez; 14 – Barrios; 17 – Portillo; 21 – Bernárdez; 23 – Reyes; 26 – Crisanto; 27 – Marinacci; 34 – Sacaza; 56 – Palma

15 July 2026 Friendly	Real Tegus	0–4	Motagua	Tegucigalpa
18:00			15' Serrano; 38' De Olivera; Hernández; Gómez	Stadium: Estadio Nacional; Referee: Starting XI: 22 – Ortíz; 4 – Vega; 5 – Padilla; 7 – Serrano; 8 – Meléndez; 17 – Portillo; 19 – De Olivera; 21 – Miranda; 23 – Reyes; 34 – Sacaza; 35 – Meléndez

18 July 2026 Friendly	Pirata	0–2	Motagua	Nacaome
17:30			35' Marinacci; 43' Palma	Stadium: Estadio José Elías Nazar; Referee: Starting XI: 25 – Licona; 3 – Cacho; 7 – Serrano; 10 – Gómez; 14 – Barrios; 17 – Portillo; 21 – Bernárdez; 23 – Reyes; 35 – Meléndez; 36 – Marinacci; 56 – Palma

27 September 2026 Friendly	Brasilia	4–4	Motagua	Río Lindo
16:00	Pitío 19'; Palma 25'; Rodríguez 75' (pen.); Méndez 81'		18' 45+2' De Olivera; 27' García; 89' Bernárdez	Stadium: Estadio Filiberto Fernández; Referee: Arlen Bardales Starting XI: 25 – Licona (substituted off) 65'; 3 – Cacho; 9 – Moya; 10 – Gómez; 15 – Hernández; 19 – De Olivera; 24 – García; 27 – Macías; 36 – Marinacci; 42 – Argueta; 80 – Oliva

3 October 2026 Friendly	Motagua	5–0	Real Tegus	Amarateca
	De Olivera; Moya; Bernárdez			Stadium: Complejo Pedro Atala Simón

=== Apertura ===
2 August 2026 Week 1	Juticalpa	0–3	Motagua	Catacamas
15:00		Report	65' Moya; 81' De Olivera; 85' Padilla	Stadium: Estadio Rubén Guifarro; Referee: Jefferson Escobar Starting XI: 22 – Ortíz; 5 – Padilla; 7 – Serrano; 8 – Meléndez (substituted off) 61'; 9 – Moya (substituted off) 70'; 15 – Hernández (substituted off) 46'; 17 – Portillo; 26 – Crisanto; 30 – Miranda (substituted off) 46'; 34 – Sacaza; 36 – Marinacci (substituted off) 23'; Substitutes; 4 – Vega (substituted on) 23'; 21 – Bernárdez (substituted on) 46'; 23 – Reyes (substituted on) 46'; 19 – De Olivera (substituted on) 61'; 10 – Gómez (substituted on) 70'
Note: All Jonathan Moya, Jeffry Miranda, Valerio Marinacci and Jesús Bernárdez made their league debuts. Jonathan Moya scored his first league goal.

9 August 2026 Week 2	Motagua	0–2	Estrella Roja	Tegucigalpa
17:15		Report	55' Mayorquín; 71' Gómez	Stadium: Estadio Nacional; Referee: James Salinas Starting XI: 25 – Licona; 3 – Cacho; 10 – Gómez (substituted off) 72'; 14 – Barrios (substituted off) 54'; 15 – Hernández (substituted off) 54'; 19 – De Olivera (substituted off) 53'; 24 – García (substituted off) 53'; 26 – Crisanto; 30 – Miranda; 34 – Sacaza; 80 – Oliva; Substitutes; 5 – Padilla (substituted on) 53'; 9 – Moya (substituted on) 53'; 7 – Serrano (substituted on) 54'; 23 – Reyes (substituted on) 54'; 27 – Macías (substituted on) 72'

16 August 2026 Week 3	Olimpia	3–1	Motagua	Tegucigalpa
17:15	Chirinos 8'; García 51'; Enríquez 77'	Report	3' Portillo	Stadium: Estadio Nacional; Referee: Saíd Martínez Starting XI: 22 – Ortíz; 4 – Vega (substituted off) 82'; 5 – Padilla; 7 – Serrano; 8 – Meléndez; 17 – Portillo (substituted off) 79'; 19 – De Olivera; 21 – Bernárdez (substituted off) 56'; 23 – Reyes; 34 – Sacaza; 35 – Meléndez (substituted off) 82'; Substitutes; 27 – Macías (substituted on) 56'; 10 – Gómez (substituted on) 79'; 3 – Cacho (substituted on) 82'; 26 – Crisanto (substituted on) 82'

21 August 2026 Week 4	Motagua	4–1	UPNFM	Tegucigalpa
19:00	De Olivera 13' 73'; Serrano 37'; Gómez 45+2' (pen.)	Report	86' Carter	Stadium: Estadio Nacional; Referee: Raúl Castro Starting XI: 22 – Ortíz; 3 – Cacho; 4 – Vega (substituted off) 71'; 5 – Padilla; 7 – Serrano; 10 – Gómez; 17 – Portillo (substituted off) 60'; 19 – De Olivera (substituted off) 75'; 23 – Reyes (substituted off) 47'; 26 – Crisanto; 27 – Macías (substituted off) 60'; Substitutes; 15 – Hernández (substituted on) 47'; 30 – Miranda (substituted on) 60'; 36 – Marinacci (substituted on) 60'; 28 – Ávila (substituted on) 71'; 9 – Moya (substituted on) 75'
Note: Jorge Serrano reached 100 league appearances with the club. Adner Ávila made his league debut.

29 August 2026 Week 5	Motagua	2–1	Olancho	Tegucigalpa
19:30	Meléndez 48'; Reyes 71'	Report	6' Bengtson	Stadium: Estadio Nacional; Referee: Nelson Salgado Starting XI: 22 – Ortíz; 3 – Cacho; 5 – Padilla; 9 – Moya (substituted off) 69'; 10 – Gómez (substituted off) 46'; 17 – Portillo (substituted off) 46'; 23 – Reyes; 27 – Macías; 30 – Miranda (substituted off) 62'; 35 – Meléndez; 36 – Marinacci (substituted off) 84'; Substitutes; 19 – De Olivera (substituted on) 46'; 34 – Sacaza (substituted on) 46'; 21 – Bernárdez (substituted on) 62'; 24 – García (substituted on) 69'; 26 – Crisanto (substituted on) 84'

5 September 2026 Week 6	Atlético Independiente	0–0	Motagua	Comayagua
17:15		Report		Stadium: Estadio Carlos Miranda; Referee: Melvin Matamoros Starting XI: 22 – Ortíz; 3 – Cacho; 5 – Padilla (substituted off) 67'; 10 – Gómez; 17 – Portillo; 19 – De Olivera; 23 – Reyes (substituted off) 58'; 27 – Macías (substituted off) 58'; 30 – Miranda; 36 – Marinacci (substituted off) 72'; 42 – Argueta (substituted off) 67'; Substitutes; 21 – Bernárdez (substituted on) 58'; 24 – García (substituted on) 58'; 16 – Palma (substituted on) 67'; 35 – Meléndez (substituted on) 67'; 34 – Sacaza (substituted on) 72'
Note: Jhen Portillo reached 100 official appearances with the club in all tournaments combined. Cristopher Meléndez reached 200 league appearances with the club.

12 September 2026 Week 7	Motagua	1–0	Policía Nacional	Comayagua
19:30	De Olivera 80'	Report		Stadium: Estadio Carlos Miranda; Referee: Arlington Escobar Starting XI: 22 – Ortíz; 3 – Cacho; 8 – Meléndez; 10 – Gómez (substituted off) 46'; 14 – Barrios (substituted off) 68'; 16 – Palma (substituted off) 46'; 26 – Crisanto; 30 – Miranda; 34 – Sacaza (substituted off) 46'; 35 – Meléndez (substituted off) 46'; 36 – Marinacci; Substitutes; 5 – Padilla (substituted on) 46'; 17 – Portillo (substituted on) 46'; 23 – Reyes (substituted on) 46'; 27 – Macías (substituted on) 46'; 19 – De Olivera (substituted on) 68'

19 September 2026 Week 8	Real España	1–0	Motagua	San Pedro Sula
19:30	Cruz 80'	Report		Stadium: Estadio General Francisco Morazán; Referee: Selvin Brown Starting XI: 22 – Ortíz; 4 – Vega; 5 – Padilla; 8 – Meléndez (substituted off) 71'; 17 – Portillo; 19 – De Olivera (substituted off) 63'; 21 – Bernárdez (substituted off) 86'; 23 – Reyes; 27 – Macías (substituted off) 86'; 34 – Sacaza; 35 – Meléndez; Substitutes; 9 – Moya (substituted on) 63'; 24 – García (substituted on) 71'; 10 – Gómez (substituted on) 86'; 14 – Barrios (substituted on) 86'

10 October 2026 Week 9	Motagua	2–1	Choloma	Tegucigalpa
17:15	Moya 16' 35'	Report	10' Alvarado	Stadium: Estadio Nacional; Referee: Selvin Brown Starting XI: 22 – Ortíz; 4 – Vega (substituted off) 46'; 5 – Padilla; 8 – Meléndez (substituted off) 61'; 9 – Moya; 19 – De Olivera (substituted off) 46'; 23 – Reyes; 26 – Crisanto (substituted off) 61'; 27 – Macías; 34 – Sacaza; 36 – Marinacci (substituted off) 66'; Substitutes; 17 – Portillo (substituted on) 46'; 21 – Bernárdez (substituted on) 46'; 10 – Gómez (substituted on) 61'; 35 – Meléndez (substituted on) 61'; 3 – Cacho (substituted on) 66'

17 October 2026 Week 10	Platense	0–2	Motagua	Puerto Cortés
15:00		Report	61' Barrios; 79' Miranda	Stadium: Estadio Excélsior; Referee: Raúl Castro Starting XI: 22 – Ortíz; 8 – Meléndez (substituted off) 65'; 17 – Portillo; 19 – De Olivera (substituted off) 65'; 21 – Bernárdez (substituted off) 57'; 23 – Reyes; 24 – García; 33 – Izaguirre (substituted off) 57'; 34 – Sacaza; 35 – Meléndez; 36 – Marinacci (substituted off) 69'; Substitutes; 14 – Barrios (substituted on) 57'; 80 – Oliva (substituted on) 57'; 10 – Gómez (substituted on) 65'; 30 – Miranda (substituted on) 65'; 3 – Cacho (substituted on) 69'
Note: Denis Meléndez reached 100 league appearances with the club. Aarón Barrios and Jeffry Miranda scored their first league goals.

25 October 2026 Week 11	Motagua	2–0	Juticalpa	Tegucigalpa
15:00	Barrios 63'; García 72'	Report		Stadium: Estadio Nacional; Referee: James Salinas Starting XI: 22 – Ortíz; 3 – Cacho; 9 – Moya (substituted off) 63'; 10 – Gómez (substituted off) 46'; 15 – Hernández (substituted off) 46'; 24 – García; 30 – Miranda (substituted off) 46'; 33 – Izaguirre (substituted off) 46'; 35 – Meléndez; 36 – Marinacci; 80 – Oliva; Substitutes; 5 – Padilla (substituted on) 46'; 17 – Portillo (substituted on) 46'; 19 – De Olivera (substituted on) 46'; 27 – Macías (substituted on) 46'; 14 – Barrios (substituted on) 63'

1 November 2026 Week 12	Motagua	2–0	Marathón	Tegucigalpa
17:15	Meléndez 28' 39'	Report		Stadium: Estadio Nacional; Referee: Amando Castro Starting XI: 22 – Ortíz; 3 – Cacho; 4 – Vega (substituted off) 23'; 5 – Padilla; 8 – Meléndez (substituted off) 74'; 9 – Moya (substituted off) 56'; 17 – Portillo; 23 – Reyes; 26 – Crisanto; 27 – Macías (substituted off) 74'; 80 – Oliva (substituted off) 57'; Substitutes; 34 – Sacaza (substituted on) 23'; 19 – De Olivera (substituted on) 56'; 30 – Miranda (substituted on) 57'; 24 – García (substituted on) 74'; 35 – Meléndez (substituted on) 74'

4 November 2026 Week 13	Estrella Roja	1–2	Motagua	Danlí
17:15	Rosales 45+1'	Report	64' Portillo; 70' Reyes	Stadium: Estadio Marcelo Tinoco; Referee: Julio Güity Starting XI: 22 – Ortíz; 3 – Cacho; 4 – Vega; 5 – Padilla; 8 – Meléndez (substituted off) 84'; 14 – Barrios (substituted off) 46'; 17 – Portillo; 23 – Reyes; 27 – Macías (substituted off) 46'; 35 – Meléndez (substituted off) 67'; 80 – Oliva (substituted off) 46'; Substitutes; 9 – Moya (substituted on) 46'; 19 – De Olivera (substituted on) 46'; 24 – García (substituted on) 46'; 26 – Crisanto (substituted on) 67'; 34 – Sacaza (substituted on) 84'

7 November 2026 Week 14	UPNFM	1–0	Motagua	Choluteca
17:15	Santos 14'	Report		Stadium: Estadio Emilio Williams Agasse; Referee: David Carrasco Starting XI: 22 – Ortíz; 8 – Meléndez (substituted off) 70'; 9 – Moya; 17 – Portillo; 19 – De Olivera (substituted off) 46'; 23 – Reyes; 27 – Macías (substituted off) 75'; 28 – Ávila (substituted off) 46'; 34 – Sacaza; 35 – Meléndez; 36 – Marinacci (substituted off) 46'; Substitutes; 4 – Vega (substituted on) 46'; 5 – Padilla (substituted on) 46'; 21 – Bernárdez (substituted on) 46'; 24 – García (substituted on) 70'; 14 – Barrios (substituted on) 75'
Note: Match suspended at 83' (1-0) due to bad weather, result stood.

=== Clausura ===
Week 1	v

=== Honduran Supercup ===
23 July 2026 Final	Motagua	0–1	Olimpia	Tegucigalpa
19:00			54' Cuello	Stadium: Estadio Nacional; Referee: Saíd Martínez Starting XI: 22 – Ortíz; 4 – Vega; 5 – Padilla; 7 – Serrano (substituted off) 74'; 8 – Meléndez (substituted off) 63'; 17 – Portillo; 19 – De Olivera (substituted off) 77'; 23 – Reyes (substituted off) 73'; 30 – Miranda (substituted off) 63'; 34 – Sacaza; 35 – Meléndez; Substitutes; 10 – Gómez (substituted on) 63'; 21 – Bernárdez (substituted on) 63'; 15 – Hernández (substituted on) 73'; 14 – Barrios (substituted on) 74'; 9 – Moya (substituted on) 77'
Note: All players who took part of this match made their Honduran Supercup debut.

=== CONCACAF Central American Cup ===
F.C. Motagua qualified to the 2026 CONCACAF Central American Cup as winners of the 2025–26 Clausura domestic league.

28 July 2026 Group D	Verdes (Belize)	0–5	(Honduras) Motagua	Belmopan, Belize
18:00		Report	7' (pen.) Vega; 49' Meléndez; 63' 75' Moya; 90+2' García	Stadium: FFB Stadium; Referee: Orlando Alvarado (GUA) Starting XI: 22 – Ortíz; 4 – Vega; 5 – Padilla; 8 – Meléndez (substituted off) 54'; 17 – Portillo (substituted off) 78'; 19 – De Olivera (substituted off) 54'; 21 – Bernárdez (substituted off) 66'; 23 – Reyes (substituted off) 66'; 34 – Sacaza; 35 – Meléndez; Substitutes; 9 – Moya (substituted on) 54'; 24 – García (substituted on) 54'; 10 – Gómez (substituted on) 66'; 30 – Miranda (substituted on) 66'; 36 – Marinacci (substituted on) 78'
Note: All Rodrigo De Olivera, Jesús Bernárdez, José Reyes, Jonathan Moya, Jordan García, Jeffry Miranda and Valerio Marinacci made their international debuts. All Denis Meléndez, Jonathan Moya and Jordan García scored their first international goals.

6 August 2026 Group D	Motagua (Honduras)	1–0	(El Salvador) FAS	Tegucigalpa, Honduras
21:00	De Olivera 62'	Report		Stadium: Estadio Nacional; Referee: Brayan Cruz (CRC) Starting XI: 22 – Ortíz; 4 – Vega; 5 – Padilla; 7 – Serrano (substituted off) 90'; 8 – Meléndez (substituted off) 58'; 9 – Moya (substituted off) 79'; 17 – Portillo; 21 – Bernárdez (substituted off) 79'; 23 – Reyes (substituted off) 90'; 34 – Sacaza; 35 – Meléndez; Substitutes; 19 – De Olivera (substituted on) 58'; 10 – Gómez (substituted on) 79'; 30 – Miranda (substituted on) 79'; 15 – Hernández (substituted on) 90'; 27 – Macías (substituted on) 90'
Note: Rodrigo De Olivera scored his first international goal.

12 August 2026 Group D	Motagua (Honduras)	1–1	(Costa Rica) Cartaginés	Tegucigalpa, Honduras
19:00	Mesén 42' (o.g.)	Report	18' González	Stadium: Estadio Nacional; Referee: Jorge Leira (PAN) Starting XI: 22 – Ortíz; 4 – Vega; 5 – Padilla; 7 – Serrano; 8 – Meléndez (substituted off) 69'; 17 – Portillo; 19 – De Olivera (substituted off) 89'; 21 – Bernárdez (substituted off) 73'; 23 – Reyes; 34 – Sacaza; 35 – Meléndez; Substitutes; 10 – Gómez (substituted on) 69'; 27 – Macías (substituted on) 73'; 14 – Barrios (substituted on) 89'

25 August 2026 Group D	Municipal (Guatemala)	1–1	(Honduras) Motagua	Guatemala City, Guatemala
20:30	López 76'	Report	36' De Olivera	Stadium: Manuel Felipe Carrera Stadium; Referee: Josué Ugalde (CRC) Starting XI: 22 – Ortíz; 4 – Vega (substituted off) 46'; 5 – Padilla; 8 – Meléndez (substituted off) 71'; 17 – Portillo; 19 – De Olivera (substituted off) 63'; 21 – Bernárdez (substituted off) 62'; 23 – Reyes; 27 – Macías (substituted off) 90'; 34 – Sacaza; 35 – Meléndez; Substitutes; 3 – Cacho (substituted on) 46'; 26 – Crisanto (substituted on) 62'; 9 – Moya (substituted on) 63'; 10 – Gómez (substituted on) 71'; 36 – Marinacci (substituted on) 90'
Note: Pablo Cacho made his international debut.

9 September 2026 Quarterfinals	Motagua (Honduras)	3–0	(El Salvador) Alianza	Tegucigalpa, Honduras
21:06	Padilla 30'; Macías 54'; Reyes 86'	Report		Stadium: Estadio Nacional; Referee: Cristhofer Corado (GUA) Starting XI: 22 – Ortíz; 4 – Vega; 5 – Padilla; 8 – Meléndez (substituted off) 65'; 17 – Portillo (substituted off) 77'; 19 – De Olivera (substituted off) 77'; 21 – Bernárdez (substituted off) 55'; 23 – Reyes; 27 – Macías; 34 – Sacaza; 35 – Meléndez; Substitutes; 30 – Miranda (substituted on) 55'; 10 – Gómez (substituted on) 65'; 14 – Barrios (substituted on) 77'; 36 – Marinacci (substituted on) 77'
Note: All Óscar Padilla, Jefryn Macías and José Reyes scored their first international goals.

16 September 2026 Quarterfinals	Alianza (El Salvador)	0–0	(Honduras) Motagua	San Salvador, El Salvador
21:15		Report		Stadium: Estadio Cuscatlán; Referee: Jesús López (MEX) Starting XI: 22 – Ortíz; 4 – Vega; 5 – Padilla; 8 – Meléndez (substituted off) 69'; 17 – Portillo (substituted off) 85'; 19 – De Olivera (substituted off) 69'; 21 – Bernárdez (substituted off) 46'; 23 – Reyes; 27 – Macías; 34 – Sacaza; 35 – Meléndez (substituted off) 57'; Substitutes; 30 – Miranda (substituted on) 46'; 26 – Crisanto (substituted on) 57'; 9 – Moya (substituted on) 69'; 10 – Gómez (substituted on) 69'; 36 – Marinacci (substituted on) 85'
Note: After this result, the club qualified to the 2027 CONCACAF Champions Cup.

22 October 2026 Semifinals	Motagua (Honduras)	0–0	(Costa Rica) Alajuelense	Tegucigalpa, Honduras
19:00		Report		Stadium: Estadio Nacional; Referee: Walter López (GUA) Starting XI: 22 – Ortíz; 4 – Vega; 5 – Padilla; 8 – Meléndez (substituted off) 85'; 17 – Portillo (substituted off) 85'; 19 – De Olivera (substituted off) 70'; 21 – Bernárdez (substituted off) 55'; 23 – Reyes; 26 – Crisanto; 27 – Macías; 34 – Sacaza; Substitutes; 30 – Miranda (substituted on) 55'; 9 – Moya (substituted on) 70'; 10 – Gómez (substituted on) 85'; 36 – Marinacci (substituted on) 85'

29 October 2026 Semifinals	Alajuelense (Costa Rica)	2–1	(Honduras) Motagua	Alajuela, Costa Rica
20:00	Añor 19'; Pérez 43'	Report	74' (o.g.) Gamboa	Stadium: Estadio Alejandro Morera Soto; Referee: Guido Gonzales (USA) Starting XI: 22 – Ortíz; 4 – Vega; 5 – Padilla; 8 – Meléndez (substituted off) 65'; 9 – Moya; 17 – Portillo; 21 – Bernárdez (substituted off) 54'; 23 – Reyes (substituted off) 71'; 27 – Macías; 34 – Sacaza (substituted off) 65'; 35 – Meléndez (substituted off) 65'; Substitutes; 19 – De Olivera (substituted on) 54'; 3 – Cacho (substituted on) 65'; 10 – Gómez (substituted on) 65'; 26 – Crisanto (substituted on) 65'; 80 – Oliva (substituted on) 71'
Note: Darell Oliva made his international debut.

== Statistics ==
As of 7 November 2026

Competition	GP	GW	GD	GL	GF	GA	GD	CS	SG	Per
Liga Nacional	14	9	1	4	21	11	+10	6	4	66.67%
Honduran Supercup	1	0	0	1	0	1	–1	0	1	0.00%
CONCACAF Central American Cup	8	3	4	1	12	4	+8	5	2	54.17%
CONCACAF Champions Cup	0	0	0	0	0	0	0	0	0	0.00%
Others	8	6	2	0	34	7	+27	4	0	83.33%
Totals	31	18	7	6	67	23	+44	15	7	65.59%
