= Jesús Batiz =

Honduran footballer (born 1999)

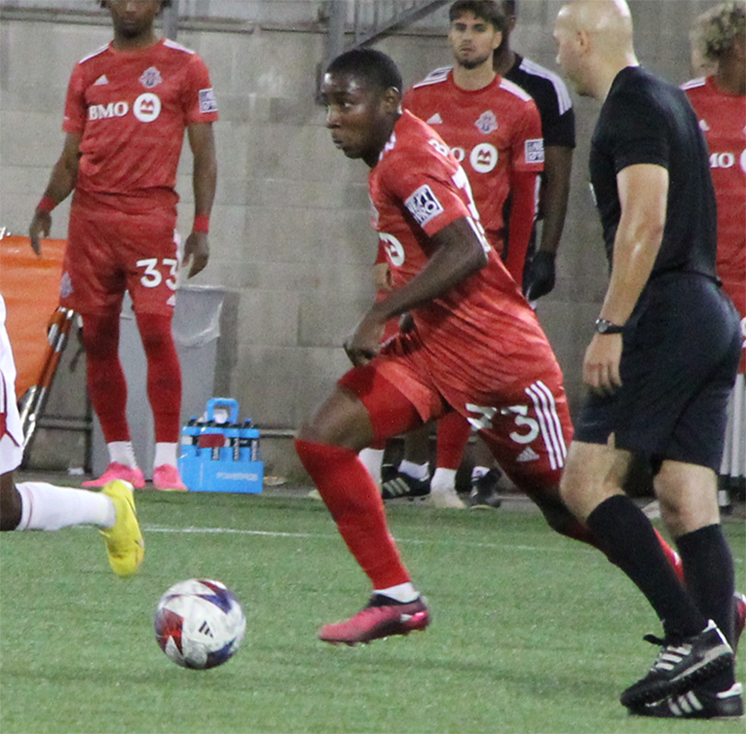
- Batiz in 2023

Personal information
- Full name: Jesús Antonio Bernárdez Batiz
- Date of birth: 14 June 1999 (age 27)
- Place of birth: Tela, Honduras
- Height: 1.78 m (5 ft 10 in)
- Position: Winger

Team information
- Current team: Motagua
- Number: 21

Youth career
- American Scores

Senior career*
Years	Team	Apps	(Gls)
2019	Mass United FC		
2019–2020	Aiolikos		
2020–2021	Mass United FC		
2021	New Amsterdam FC	18	(2)
2022	Rochester New York FC	24	(4)
2023–2024	Toronto FC II	49	(12)
2023–2024	→ Toronto FC (loan)	2	(0)
2025	Cartaginés	35	(2)
2026	Sporting San José	11	(0)
2026–	Motagua	7	(0)
- * Club domestic league appearances and goals as of 2 November 2026

Jesús Antonio Bernárdez Batiz (born June 14, 1999) is a Honduran professional footballer who plays for Liga Nacional de Fútbol de Honduras club Motagua.

== Early life ==
Batiz was born to parents from Triunfo de la Cruz, Honduras and holds dual American and Honduran nationality. He played youth club soccer with American Scores.

In 2017, he led his high school, Boston International HS, to the Boston City League title, scoring a hat trick in the championship final and winning MVP honors. He attended the school from 2015 to 2018, being named Boston City League Player of the year twice, and being named to the All-Decade team in 2020, having scored 70 goals in his four years, including 63 in his final two seasons.

== Club career ==
In 2019, he played with Mass United FC in the United Premier Soccer League.

In August 2019, he signed with Greek club Aiolikos in the Gamma Ethniki. He joined as a result of a partnership formed between Mass United and Aiolikos. On 2 February 2020, he made his debut for the club against Marko.

He then returned to Mass United FC. In 2021, he played for Mass United in the NISA Independence Cup against New Amsterdam FC, who became impressed with his performance and signed him to a professional contract for their season in NISA.

In February 2022, he signed with MLS Next Pro side Rochester New York FC. He scored his first goal for the club on May 11 in a 3–1 loss in the US Open Cup match against Major League Soccer club New York City FC.

In March 2023, he signed with Toronto FC II in MLS Next Pro. He made his club debut on 27 March 2023, against FC Cincinnati 2. On 23 April 2023, he scored his first goal and also recorded his first assist for Toronto FC II against Philadelphia Union II. In July 2023, he signed a short-term loan with the Toronto FC first team. He made his Major League Soccer debut on 4 July against Orlando City SC. He signed an additional short-term loan on 8 July. After making two MLS appearances, he signed another short-term loan ahead of a Leagues Cup match against Mexican club Atlas. In 2024, he signed additional short-term loan agreements. Batiz's contract expired following the 2024 season.

In January 2025, he signed a one-and-a-half year contract with Costa Rican club Cartaginés in the Liga FPD.

In January 2026, he signed with fellow Costa Rican side Sporting San José. In May 2026, he departed the club.

In May 2026, he signed with Liga Nacional de Fútbol de Honduras club Motagua on a one-year contract.

== International career ==
In August 2024, Batiz was called up to the Honduras national team for the first time, ahead of their CONCACAF Nations League matches in September.

== Career statistics ==
As of 4 November 2026

Appearances and goals by club, season and competition
Club	Season	League			Playoffs		National cup		Other		Total	
Club	Season	Division	Apps	Goals	Apps	Goals	Apps	Goals	Apps	Goals	Apps	Goals
New Amsterdam FC	2021	NISA	18	2	—		—		—		18	2
Rochester New York FC	2022	MLS Next Pro	24	4	1	0	3	1	—		28	5
Toronto FC II	2023	MLS Next Pro	27	8	—		—		—		27	8
Toronto FC II	2024	MLS Next Pro	22	4	—		—		—		22	4
Toronto FC II	Total		49	12	0	0	0	0	0	0	49	12
Toronto FC (loan)	2023	Major League Soccer	2	0	—		0	0	1 (Note: Appearance in Leagues Cup)	0	3	0
Toronto FC (loan)	2024	Major League Soccer	0	0	—		1	0	0	0	1	0
Toronto FC (loan)	Total		2	0	0	0	1	0	1	0	4	0
Cartaginés	2024–25	Liga FPD	16	1	—		0	0	—		16	1
Cartaginés	2025–26	Liga FPD	19	1	—		0	0	—		16	1
Cartaginés	Total		35	2	0	0	0	0	0	0	35	2
Sporting San José	2025–26	Liga FPD	11	0	—		2	0	—		13	0
Motagua	2026–27	Liga Nacional de Fútbol de Honduras	7	0	—		0	0	1 (Note: Appearance in Honduran Supercup)	0	8	0
Career total			146	20	1	0	6	1	2	0	155	21
