= Maicol Cabrera =

Uruguayan footballer (born 1996)

Personal information
- Full name: Maicol Gabriel Cabrera Galain
- Date of birth: 11 May 1996 (age 30)
- Place of birth: Maldonado, Uruguay
- Height: 1.88 m (6 ft 2 in)
- Position: Striker

Team information
- Current team: Erbil SC
- Number: 11

Youth career
- Nacional

Senior career*
Years	Team	Apps	(Gls)
2015–2017	Nacional	0	(0)
2015–2016	→ Santos Laguna Premier (loan)		
2016	→ Tampico Madero (loan)	11	(0)
2017	→ Santos Laguna Premier (loan)		(–)
2017	→ Racing (loan)	5	(0)
2018–2019	Racing	24	(5)
2019	→ Torque (loan)	16	(1)
2020–2021	Cerro	29	(9)
2021	Santiago Wanderers	12	(0)
2021–2022	Danubio	28	(5)
2022	→ Huracán (loan)	7	(0)
2023	Liverpool	18	(3)
2023	River Plate	8	(0)
2024–2025	Miramar Misiones	18	(1)
2025	Rajasthan United	9	(5)
2025	Motagua	13	(5)
2026	Erbil SC	11	(2)

International career
2013	Uruguay U17	5	(0)
- * Club domestic league appearances and goals as of 8 November 2026

Maicol Gabriel Cabrera Galain (born 11 May 1996) is an Uruguayan professional footballer who most recently played as a striker.

== Club career ==
Cabrera signed for I-League club Rajasthan United in February 2024. For the club, he scored a goal on 28 March, in their 3–1 win against Delhi.

== Honours ==
Torque

- Segunda División: 2019
