= Jeffry Miranda =

Honduran footballer (born 2002)

Personal information
- Full name: Jeffry Eyeri Miranda Miguel
- Date of birth: 3 September 2002 (age 24)
- Place of birth: Cortés, Honduras
- Position: Forward

Team information
- Current team: Motagua

Senior career*
Years	Team	Apps	(Gls)
2019–2024	Marathón	25	(2)
2024	Victoria		
2024–2025	Marathón		
2025–2026	Génesis PN		
2026–	Motagua	0	(0)

International career^{‡}
2019	Honduras U17	5	(5)
- * Club domestic league appearances and goals as of 1 July 2026 ‡ National team caps and goals as of June 14, 2020 (UTC)

Jeffry Eyeri Miranda Miguel (born 3 September 2002) is a Honduran footballer currently playing as a forward for F.C. Motagua.

He made his professional debut on 17 April 2019 as a sixteen-year-old, scoring during a 6–0 win over Honduras Progreso.

== Career statistics ==
=== Club ===
As of 14 June 2020.

Club	Season	League			Cup		Continental		Other		Total	
Club	Season	Division	Apps	Goals	Apps	Goals	Apps	Goals	Apps	Goals	Apps	Goals
Marathón	2018–19	Liga Salva-Vida	1	1	0	0	–		0	0	1	1
Marathón	2019–20	Liga Salva-Vida	3	1	0	0	0	0	0	0	3	1
Career total			4	2	0	0	0	0	0	0	4	2
