= Carlos Mejía (footballer, born 2000) =

Honduran footballer

Personal information
- Full name: Carlos Adonys Mejía Estrada
- Date of birth: 19 February 2000 (age 26)
- Place of birth: La Ceiba, Honduras
- Height: 1.74 m (5 ft 9 in)
- Position: Midfielder

Team information
- Current team: Motagua
- Number: 77

Youth career
- Academia del Sauce
- Vida

Senior career*
Years	Team	Apps	(Gls)
2017–2021	Vida	19	(1)
2019	→ Real España (loan)	7	(0)
2020–2021	→ Pumas Tabasco (loan)	20	(2)
2021–	Motagua	65	(8)

International career
- Honduras U17
- Honduras U20
2024–	Honduras	1	(0)
- * Club domestic league appearances and goals as of 11 July 2021

Carlos Adonys Mejía Estrada (born 19 February 2000) is a Honduran professional footballer who plays as a midfielder for F.C. Motagua in the Honduran Liga Nacional and the Honduras national team.

== Club career ==
He made his professional debut with Vida at the age of 17, and was loaned out to Real España in 2019. In the summer of 2020 he was loaned out to second-tier Mexican side Pumas Tabasco.

== International career ==
He represented his country at the 2017 FIFA U-17 World Cup and the 2019 FIFA U-20 World Cup.

He made his national debut in a friendly match coming off as a substitute against Iceland.
