= Rodrigo de Olivera =

Urugayan footballer (born 1994)

Personal information
- Full name: Rodrigo de Olivera Donado
- Date of birth: 20 December 1994 (age 31)
- Place of birth: Montevideo, Uruguay
- Height: 1.80 m (5 ft 11 in)
- Position: Forward

Team information
- Current team: Motagua
- Number: 19

Senior career*
Years	Team	Apps	(Gls)
2012–2015	Danubio	2	(1)
2016–2018	Montevideo Wanderers	20	(3)
2017	Villa Española	10	(1)
2017	Cerrito	15	(2)
2018–2019	Tacuarembó	18	(5)
2019–2023	Central Español	18	(3)
2020	Montevideo City Torque	5	(0)
2021–2022	Barnechea	24	(3)
2023–2025	Juticalpa	35	(8)
2025	Olancho	24	(19)
2026–	Motagua	18	(9)
- * Club domestic league appearances and goals as of 20:42, April 2026 (UTC)

Rodrigo de Olivera Donado (born 20 December 1994) is a Uruguayan professional footballer who plays as a forward for Liga Nacional club Motagua.

== Career ==
De Olivera developed at the Danubio academy before playing for Montevideo Wanderers and Montevideo City Torque. He left Montevideo City Torque for Chilean club Barnechea in 2021.

De Olivera moved to Juticalpa of Honduras in 2023, then playing in the second-tier Liga de Ascenso. He helped Juticalpa avoid relegation from the Liga Nacional and, after being released by the club, joined league rivals Olancho in May 2025. For Olancho, he scored 19 goals in the 2025 Apertura of the Liga Nacional, breaking a 56-year-old record for goals scored by a foreign player in a split season of the Honduran league and equalling the record for goals scored by any player in the same setting. In January 2026 Motagua announced the signing of De Olivera.
