= José Reyes (Honduran footballer) =

Honduran footballer (born 1997)

Personal information
- Full name: José Alejandro Reyes Cerna
- Date of birth: 5 November 1997 (age 29)
- Place of birth: Tegucigalpa, Honduras
- Height: 1.78 m (5 ft 10 in)
- Position: Midfielder

Team information
- Current team: Motagua
- Number: 23

Youth career
- Olimpia

Senior career*
Years	Team	Apps	(Gls)
2016–2020	Olimpia	59	(6)
2020–2023	Real España	65	(4)
2023–2024	Génesis		
2024–2025	Sporting		
2026–	Motagua	0	(0)

International career^{‡}
2017	Honduras U20	7	(0)
2019–	Honduras U23	10	(1)
2019–	Honduras	1	(0)
Medal record
Representing Honduras
Men's football
Pan American Games
Silver medal – second place	2019 Lima	Team competition
- * Club domestic league appearances and goals as of 3 January 2026 ‡ National team caps and goals as of 30 July 2019

José Alejandro Reyes Cerna, known as José Reyes, (born 5 November 1997) is a Honduran professional footballer who plays as a midfielder for Real España and the Honduras national team

== International career ==
He was selected for the Honduras U-20 squad for the 2017 FIFA U-20 World Cup and appeared at every game the squad played as they were eliminated at group stage.

He was selected for the senior Honduras squad for the 2019 CONCACAF Gold Cup and made his debut on 21 June 2019 in a 0–1 loss to Curaçao, as a 76th-minute substitute for Michaell Chirinos.

== Honours ==
C.D. Olimpia

- CONCACAF League: 2017

Honduras Youth

- Pan American Silver Medal: 2019
