= Marlon Licona =

Honduran footballer (born 1991)

Personal information
- Full name: Marlon Javier Licona López
- Date of birth: 9 February 1991 (age 35)
- Place of birth: Catacamas, Honduras
- Height: 1.80 m (5 ft 11 in)
- Position: Goalkeeper

Team information
- Current team: Motagua
- Number: 25

Senior career*
Years	Team	Apps	(Gls)
2010–	Motagua	153	(0)
2017–2018	→ Honduras Progreso (loan)	14	(0)
2023	→ Victoria (loan)	14	(0)

International career^{‡}
2010–2011	Honduras U20	4	(0)
2011	Honduras U23	1	(0)
- * Club domestic league appearances and goals as of 04:15, 29 November 2024 ‡ National team caps and goals as of 04:15, 29 November 2024 (UTC)

Marlon Javier Licona Lopez (born 9 February 1991) is a Honduran professional footballer who plays as a goalkeeper for the club Motagua.

== Career ==
Licona began his career with Motagua in 2010, and is the long-time backup goalkeeper for the squad. He made his professional debut with Motagua in a 2–1 Liga Nacional loss to Olimpia on 1 September 2013. He briefly joined Honduras Progreso on loan for the 2017–18 season.

== International career ==
Licona was called up to represent Honduras at the 2021 CONCACAF Gold Cup.

== Career statistics ==
As of match played on 11 November 2024

Appearances and goals by club, season and competition
Club	Season	League			Cup		Continental		Other		Total	
Club	Season	Division	Apps	Goals	Apps	Goals	Apps	Goals	Apps	Goals	Apps	Goals
Motagua	2009–10	Liga Nacional	1	0	—		—		—		1	0
Motagua	2010–11	Liga Nacional	8	0	—		0	0	—		8	0
Motagua	2011–12	Liga Nacional	2	0	—		0	0	—		2	0
Motagua	2012–13	Liga Nacional	—		—		—		—		0	0
Motagua	2013–14	Liga Nacional	16	0	—		—		—		16	0
Motagua	2014–15	Liga Nacional	13	0	4	0	—		—		17	0
Motagua	2015–16	Liga Nacional	16	0	4	0	1	0	—		21	0
Motagua	2016–17	Liga Nacional	11	0	1	0	—		—		12	0
Motagua	2017–18	Liga Nacional	3	0	—		—		—		4	0
Motagua	2018–19	Liga Nacional	9	0	—		0	0	—		9	0
Motagua	2019–20	Liga Nacional	9	0	—		0	0	—		9	0
Motagua	2020–21	Liga Nacional	6	0	—		1	0	—		7	0
Motagua	2021–22	Liga Nacional	22	0	—		2	0	—		24	0
Motagua	2022–23	Liga Nacional	24	0	—		2	0	—		26	0
Motagua	2023–24	Liga Nacional	1	0	—		—		—		1	0
Motagua	2024–25	Liga Nacional	12	0	—		—		—		12	0
Motagua	Total		153	0	9	0	6	0	—		168	0
Honduras Progreso (loan)	2017–18	Liga Nacional	14	0	—		—		—		14	0
Victoria (loan)	2023–24	Liga Nacional	14	0	—		—		—		14	0
Career total			181	0	9	0	6	0	0	0	196	0
