= Jordan García =

Colombian footballer

Personal information
- Full name: Jordan Javier Garcia Bonett
- Date of birth: 20 June 2005 (age 21)
- Place of birth: El Retén, Colombia
- Height: 1.88 m (6 ft 2 in)
- Position: Goalkeeper

Team information
- Current team: Atlante (on loan from León)
- Number: 33

Youth career
- Fortaleza

Senior career*
Years	Team	Apps	(Gls)
2023–2025	Fortaleza	50	(0)
2026–	León	3	(0)
2026–	→ Atlante (loan)	0	(0)

International career
2025	Colombia U20	17	(0)
- * Club domestic league appearances and goals as of 12 August 2026

Jordan Javier Garcia Bonett (born 20 June 2005) is a Colombian footballer who plays as a goalkeeper for Liga MX club Atlante, on loan from León.

== Club career ==
Born in El Retén, Colombia, García started his career with Fortaleza and made his professional debut at the age of 17. During the 2025 season, he recorded an average of 0.69 goals conceded per match and a save percentage of over 84%.

In June 2025, García was transferred to Liga MX club León under an agreement set to take effect in January 2026. In April 2026, he was included by CIES Football Observatory in the list of the 100 goalkeepers who did not yet turn 23 with the highest estimated transfer value.

On 11 August 2026, García was loaned to Atlante.

== International career ==
García represented Colombia at under-20 level in both the 2025 South American Championship and the 2025 FIFA World Cup.
