= Luís Crisanto =

Honduran association football player

Personal information
- Full name: Luís Santamaría Crisanto Peña
- Date of birth: 1 March 2000 (age 26)
- Place of birth: El Progreso, Honduras
- Position: Defender

Team information
- Current team: Motagua
- Number: 26

Youth career
- 2019–2021: Honduras Progreso

Senior career*
Years	Team	Apps	(Gls)
2020–2021	Honduras Progreso	0	(0)
2021	Marathón Reserves	?	(?)
2022–2024	Atlético Junior	?	(?)
2024–2025	Juticalpa	27	(1)
2025–	Motagua	0	(0)

International career^{‡}
2025–	Honduras	5	(0)
- * Club domestic league appearances and goals as of 5 June 2025 ‡ National team caps and goals as of 29 June 2025

Luís Santamaría Crisanto Peña (born 1 March 2000), most commonly known as Luís Santamaría, is a Honduran footballer currently playing as a defender for F.C. Motagua in the Honduran Liga Nacional and the Honduras national team. His dad Luis Santamaría also played professionally between 1993 and 2014.

== National team ==
He was called by Reinaldo Rueda to represent Honduras at the 2025 CONCACAF Gold Cup.
