= Denis Meléndez =

Honduran footballer (born 1995)

Personal information
- Full name: Denis Javier Meléndez Rosales
- Date of birth: 22 July 1995 (age 31)
- Place of birth: La Ceiba, Honduras
- Position: Midfielder

Team information
- Current team: Motagua
- Number: 8

Senior career*
Years	Team	Apps	(Gls)
2015–2018	Victoria	4	(0)
2018–2023	Vida	141	(7)
2023–	Motagua	0	(0)
- * Club domestic league appearances and goals as of 8 July 2023 ‡ National team caps and goals as of 23:02, 24 March 2021 (UTC)

Denis Javier Meléndez Rosales (born 22 July 1995) is a Honduran professional footballer who plays as a midfielder for Liga Nacional club F.C. Motagua.

== Career ==
Meléndez made his professional debut with C.D. Victoria in a 4–0 Liga Nacional loss to C.D. Olimpia on 27 February 2016.

== Personal life ==
Denis' brother, Carlos Meléndez, is also a professional footballer.
