= Luis Vega (footballer) =

Honduran footballer (born 2002)

Personal information
- Full name: Luis Fernando Vega Villacorta
- Date of birth: 28 February 2002 (age 24)
- Place of birth: San Pedro Sula, Honduras
- Height: 1.91 m (6 ft 3 in)
- Position: Defender

Senior career*
Years	Team	Apps	(Gls)
2020–2023	Marathón	88	(3)
2023–2025	Motagua	56	(7)

International career^{‡}
2019	Honduras U17	4	(0)
2023–	Honduras	14	(1)
- * Club domestic league appearances and goals as of 17 July 2023 ‡ National team caps and goals as of 21:00, 16 June 2024 (UTC)

Luis Fernando Vega Villacorta (born 28 February 2002) is a Honduran footballer currently playing as a midfielder for the Honduras national team.

== Career statistics ==
=== Club ===
As of 14 June 2020.

Club	Season	League			Cup		Continental		Other		Total	
Club	Season	Division	Apps	Goals	Apps	Goals	Apps	Goals	Apps	Goals	Apps	Goals
Marathón	2019–20	Liga Salva-Vida	6	0	0	0	0	0	0	0	6	0
Career total			6	0	0	0	0	0	0	0	6	0

=== International ===
As of match played 16 June 2024

National team	Year	Apps	Goals
Honduras	2023	10	0
Honduras	2024	4	1
Total		14	1
