= Rodrigo Gómez (Argentine footballer) =

Argentine footballer

Personal information
- Full name: Rodrigo Manuel Gómez
- Date of birth: January 2, 1993 (age 33)
- Place of birth: Santa Fé, Argentina
- Height: 1.68 m (5 ft 6 in)
- Position: Right winger

Team information
- Current team: Motagua
- Number: 10

Senior career*
Years	Team	Apps	(Gls)
2012–2014	Argentinos Juniors	39	(4)
2014–2016	Independiente	14	(1)
2015	→ Quilmes (loan)	29	(4)
2016–2020	Toluca	28	(0)
2018	→ Unión de Santa Fe (loan)	26	(0)
2019	→ San Martín (T) (loan)	9	(2)
2019	→ Huracán (loan)	4	(1)
2020–2021	Asteras Tripolis	22	(1)
2022	Palestino	9	(0)
2022–	San Martín (T)	7	(0)
- * Club domestic league appearances and goals as of 18:20, 31 July 2022 (UTC)

Rodrigo Manuel Gómez (born 2 January 1993) is an Argentine professional footballer who plays for San Martín de Tucumán as a middle left.

== Career ==
=== Argentinos Juniors ===
While at Argentinos Juniors, Gomez made 39 league appearances, scoring four goals. His debut came on 4 May 2013 in a 2–1 loss to Lanús, in which he played all 90 minutes. His first goal came on 2 June 2013 in a 2–0 win over River Plate. His goal, assisted by Pedro Pablo Hernández, came in the 87th minute.

=== Independiente ===
In August 2014, Gomez was sold to Independiente for a fee in the region of €750,000. His debut came on 16 August 2014 in a 1–0 loss to Estudiantes. His first goal came on 14 May 2016 in a 2–0 win over Arsenal Sarandí. He came on as an 85th minute sub, replacing Emiliano Rigoni, and scored two minutes later, making the score 2–0.

=== Quilmes (Loan) ===
In January 2015, Gomez was sent out on a full year loan to Quilmes. He made his debut on 15 February 2015 in a 1–0 loss to Lanús. He would go on to play 29 matches on his loan. His first goal came on 28 February 2015, against his parent club Club Atlético Independiente, who decided not to enforce the rule that players they loaned out couldn't play against them. However, Independiente won the match 2–1. Gomez scored in the 39th minute.

=== Toluca ===
On 28 May 2016, Toluca signed Gómez from CA Independiente. He made his league debut on 31 July 2016 in a 1–0 loss to Chiapas.

=== Union ===
In January 2018, Gomez was loaned out to Unión de Santa Fe. He made his league debut on 28 January 2018 in a 2–1 win over Racing Club de Avellaneda. He was subbed on in the 66th minute, replacing Franco Fragapane.

=== Huracán ===
On 1 July 2019 Club Atlético Huracán announced, that Gómez had joined the club on a one-year loan deal with an option to buy.
